= Stranger Music =

1993 book by Leonard Cohen

- First edition
- Author: Leonard Cohen
- Language: English
- Genre: Poetry
- Publisher: McClelland & Stewart
- Publication date: 1993
- Publication place: Canada
- Pages: 415
- ISBN: 978-0679755418
- OCLC: 670435038

Stranger Music is a 1993 book by Leonard Cohen. It compiles many of his published poems, as well as the lyrics to his songs.

In the "A Note On The Text" section of the book it states: In some sections of this book, certain poem titles and texts have been altered from their original publication.

In the section taken from Death of a Lady's Man, some changes have been made for this edition: "A Woman's Decision" originally appeared as the commentary to "The Lover After All; "A Different Drum" as the commentary to "The Other Village"; "A Marvellous Woman" as the commentary to "No One Watching"; the text of "Not Going Back" is from the commentary to "The Rose"; the text of "Montreal" is from the commentary to "St. Francis"; "French and English" from the commentary to "Our Government-in-Exile"; "Roshi" originally appeared as the commentary to "Formal in His Thought of Her."; "The End of My Life in Art" originally appeared under the title "My Life in Art"; "Roshi Again" originally appeared as the commentary to "My Life in Art." The poems mentioned above have been given new titles for this edition. The poems in italic have, for this edition, incorporated the word "commentary" into the title.

Poems reproduced here from Selected Poems 1956–1968 had original publication in that edition.

Selections from Beautiful Losers and Book of Mercy were given titles for this edition. All but three of the poems selected for this edition from The Energy of Slaves were originally untitled.

Lyrics omitted from the collection: "Stories of the Street," "A Bunch of Lonesome Heroes," "The Old Revolution," "The Butcher," "Tonight Will Be Fine," "Last Year's Man," "Dress Rehearsal Rag," "Love Calls You by Your Name," "Sing Another Song, Boys," "Lover Lover Lover," "Leaving Green Sleeves," "Iodine," "Death of a Ladies Man," "Humbled in Love," "The Smokey Life," "The Law," "Hunter's Lullaby," "Heart With No Companion," "Jazz Police," "Tacoma Trailer."

== Contents ==
=== Let Us Compare Mythologies ===
- "Poem"
- "Letter"
- "Lovers"
- "Prayer for Messiah"
- "When This American Woman"
- "These Heroics"
- "Warning"
- "The Fly"

=== The Spice-Box of Earth ===
- "As the Mist Leaves No Scar"
- "Beneath My Hands"
- "I Have Not Lingered in European Monasteries"
- " Long to Hold Some Lady"
- "Owning Everything"
- "Song"
- "For Anne"
- "You Have the Lovers"
- "Song for Abraham Klein"
- "Song to Make Me Still"
- "Summer Haiku"
- "My Lady Can Sleep"
- "Gift"
- "I Wonder How Many People in This City"
- "Travel"
- "I Have Two Bars of Soap"
- "The Cuckold's Song"
- "Morning Song"
- "The Flowers That I Left in the Ground"
- "A Kite Is a Victim"
- "There Are Some Men"
- "Isaiah"

=== Flowers for Hitler ===
- "What I'm Doing Here"
- "I Wanted to Be a Doctor"
- "The Drawer's Condition on November 28, 1961"
- "The Invisible Trouble"
- "Opium and Hitler"
- "It Uses Us!"
- "Heirloom"
- "All There Is to Know about Adolph Eichmann"
- "Sky"
- "Hitler"
- "The Failure of a Secular Life"
- "Wheels, Fireclouds"
- "The Music Crept by Us"
- "Hydra 1960"
- "Queen Victoria and Me"
- "I Had It for a Moment"
- "The Way Back"
- "On Hearing a Name Long Unspoken"
- "Style"
- "Disguises"
- "Cherry Orchards"
- "Streetcars"
- "Nothing I Can Lose"
- "Front Lawn"
- "The Big World"
- "The Lists"
- "Promise"
- "For E. J. P."

=== Parasites of Heaven ===
- "One Night I Burned"
- "I See You on a Greek Mattress"
- "Snow is Falling"
- "Fingerprints"
- "A Cross Didn't Fall on Me"

=== Songs of Leonard Cohen ===
- "Suzanne"
- "Teachers"
- "Winter Lady"
- "So Long, Marianne"
- "One of Us Cannot Be Wrong"
- "Hey, That's No Way to Say Goodbye"
- "Master Song"
- "Sisters of Mercy"
- "The Stranger Song"

=== Selected Poems 1956–1968 ===
- "A Person Who Eats Meat"
- "Marita"
- "This Is for You"
- "The Reason I Write"
- "You Do Not Have to Love Me"
- "You Live Like a God"

=== Beautiful Losers ===
- "Be with Me"
- "What Is a Saint"
- "A Great Feast in Quebec"
- "Magic is Alive"
- "All Right, Edith"
- "Believe me, Edith"

=== Songs from a Room ===
- "Story of Isaac"
- "Lady Midnight"
- "You Know Who I Am"
- "Seems So Long Ago, Nancy"
- "Bird on the Wire"

=== Songs of Love and Hate ===
- "Joan of Arc"
- "Avalanche"
- "Diamonds in the Mine"
- "Famous Blue Raincoat"

=== The Energy of Slaves ===
- "Welcome to These Lines"
- "The Only Poem"
- "Portrait of a Girl"
- "I Perceived the Outline of Your Breasts"
- "The Escape"
- "I Am Dying"
- "1967"
- "Ugly in My Own Eyes"
- "There Are No Traitors"
- "I Left a Woman"
- "Invisible Tonight"
- "Love Is a Fire"
- "You Tore Your Shirt"
- "Threat"
- "Dark at Four O'Clock"
- "Far from the Soil"
- "My Room"
- "The Road to Larissa"
- "I Am Punished"
- "Aquarian Age"
- "The Killers"
- "Purest of Occasions"
- "You went to Work"
- "Any System"
- "One of These Days"
- "I Try to Keep in Touch"
- "My Greed"
- "Your Eyes"
- "This is War"
- "I'd Like to Read"
- "The Poems Don't Love Us Any More"
- "Stay"
- "Etiquette"
- "A Veil"
- "A Future Night"
- "Morocco"
- "Song for My Assassin"
- "The Wrong Man"
- "One"
- "This Is My Voice"

=== New Skin for the Old Ceremony ===
- "Chelsea Hotel"
- "Take This Longing"
- "Field Commander Cohen"
- "There Is a War"
- "Is This What You Wanted"
- "Why Don't You Try"
- "I Tried to Leave You"
- "Who by Fire?"
- "A Singer Must Die"

=== Death of a Ladies' Man ===
- "Memories"
- "Paper-Thin Hotel"
- "True Love Leaves No Traces"
- "I Left a Woman Waiting"
- "Don't Go Home with Your Hard-On"

=== Death of a Lady's Man ===
- "I Knelt Beside a Stream"
- "The Café"
- Commentary - The Café
- "The Change"
- Commentary - The Change
- "Death to This Book"
- Commentary - Death to This Book
- "Another Room"
- Commentary - Another Room
- "Death of a Lady's Man"
- "My Wife and I"
- Commentary - My Wife and I
- "The News You Really Hate"
- Commentary - The News You Really Hate
- "I Decided"
- "The Beetle"
- Commentary - The Beetle
- "The Altar"
- Commentary - The Altar
- "This Marriage"
- Commentary - This Marriage
- Commentary II - This Marriage
- "The Photograph"
- "It's Probably Spring"
- Commentary - It's Probably Spring
- "Another Family"
- "The Asthmatic"
- Commentary - The Asthmatic
- "A Woman's Decision"
- "I Bury My Girlfriend"
- "A Different Drum"
- "A Working Man"
- Commentary - A Working Man
- "The Unclean Start"
- "Angelic"
- "The Next One"
- "A Marvellous Woman"
- "The Event"
- "You Have No Form"
- "The Dream"
- "I Like the Way You Opposed Me"
- "Beside My Son"
- Commentary - Beside My Son
- "She Has Given Me the Bullet"
- Commentary - She Has Given Me the Bullet
- "The Good Fight"
- "The Dove"
- "The Rose"
- "Not Going Back"
- "Montreal"
- "French and English"
- "O Wife Unmasked"
- "The Window"
- "Your Death"
- "Petitions"
- "The Rebellion"
- "The Price of This Book"
- "Roshi"
- "This Wretch"
- "Hurry to Your Dinner"
- Commentary - Hurry to Your Dinner
- "Slowly I Married Her"
- "The Transmission"
- "End of My Life in Art"
- "Roshi Again"
- "How to Speak Poetry"
- Commentary - How to Speak Poetry
- "The Politics of This Book"
- "You're Not Supposed to Be Here"
- "Final Examination"
- Commentary - Final Examination

=== Recent Songs ===
- "Came So Far For Beauty"
- "The Window"
- "Our Lady of Solitude"
- "The Gypsy's Wife"
- "The Traitor"
- "The Guests"
- "Ballad of the Absent Mare"

=== Book of Mercy ===
- "I Stopped to Listen"
- "When I Left the King"
- "I Hear My Soul Singing"
- "Sit Down, Master"
- "In the Eyes of Men"
- "Blessed Are You"
- "You Have Sweetened Your Word"
- "I Draw Aside the Curtain"
- "Friend, When You Speak"
- "My Teacher"
- "Israel"
- "You Who Pour Mercy into Hell"
- "When I Have Not Rage"
- "We Cry Out"
- "You Who Question Souls"
- "It Is All Around Me"
- "It Is to You I Turn"
- "Holy Is Your Name"
- "Not Knowing Where to Go"
- "All My Life"
- "I Lost My Way"

=== Various Positions ===
- "Dance Me to the End of Love"
- "Coming Back to You"
- "The Captain"
- "If It Be Your Will"
- "The Night Comes On"
- "Hallelujah"

=== I'm Your Man ===
- "First We Take Manhattan"
- "Take This Waltz"
- "Ain't No Cure for Love"
- "I'm Your Man"
- "I Can't Forget"
- "Everybody Knows"
- "Tower of Song"

=== The Future ===
- "Democracy"
- "The Future"
- "Anthem"
- "Light as the Breeze"
- "Closing Time"
- "Waiting for the Miracle"

=== Uncollected Poems ===
- "To a Fellow Student"
- "Fragment from a Journal"
- "When Even The"
- "Paris Models"
- "On Seeing Kabir's Poems on Her Dressing Table"
- "My Honour"
- "Peace"
- "The Embrace"
- "A Deep Happiness"
- "Every Pebble"
- "Days of Kindness"
