= List of awards and nominations received by Leonard Cohen =

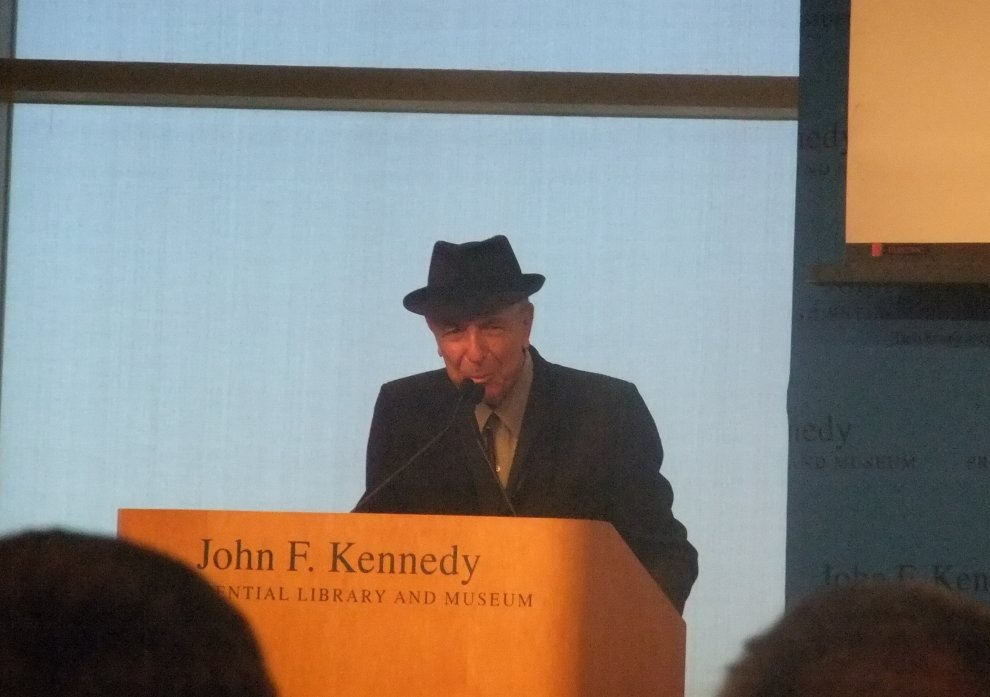
Cohen was honoured alongside Chuck Berry as the recipients of the first annual PEN Awards for songwriting excellence at the JFK Presidential Library, Boston, Massachusetts on 26 February 2012.

Award	Year	Nominee(s)	Category	Result	Ref.
Danish Music Awards	1993	Himself	Best International Male	Won	
Hungarian Music Awards	2013	Old Ideas	Best Foreign Pop Album	Won	
Hungarian Music Awards	2015	Popular Problems	Best Foreign Pop Album	Nominated	
Hungarian Music Awards	2020	Thanks for the Dance	Best Foreign Pop Album	Nominated	
Žebřík Music Awards	2009	Live in London	Best International Music DVD	Nominated	

- 1964 the Québec Literary Competition Prize (awarded 1923–70 by the Province of Québec) The Favourite Game (Cohen's first novel)
- 1968 Governor General's Award (English language poetry or drama) for Selected Poems 1956–1968. (Refused)
- 1971 Honorary degree of Doctor of Laws (LL.D) from Dalhousie University, Halifax, Nova Scotia.
- 1984 The Golden Rose, the main award at the international television festival Rose d'Or in Montreux, for I am a Hotel, made-for-TV short musical film written by Cohen and based on his songs.
- 1985 Canadian Authors Association Literary Award for Poetry for Book of Mercy
- 1986 Genie Award for Best Original Song for "Angel Eyes" from Night Magic (with Lewis Furey)
- 1988 Columbia Records Crystal Globe Award from CBS for I'm Your Man. The award is for artists who sell more than five million copies of an album in foreign territories
- 1989 Nominated for Juno Awards for Canadian Entertainer of the Year and Male Vocalist of the Year
- 1991 Officer of the Order of Canada
- 1991 Induction into the Juno/Canadian Music Hall of Fame
- 1991 Nominated for a Juno Award for Songwriter of the Year.
- 16 June 1992 Honorary degree of Doctor of Letters (D.Litt) from McGill University, Montreal.
- 1993 Juno Award for Male Vocalist of the Year. The video for Closing Time, directed by Curtis Wehrfritz, won for Best Video. He was also nominated as Producer of the Year (with co-producer Leanne Ungar, for "Closing Time").
- 1993 Governor General's Performing Arts Award for Lifetime Artistic Achievement.
- 1994 Juno Award for Songwriter of the Year and was nominated for the Juno Award for Album of the Year (for The Future). The video for The Future, directed by Curtis Wehrfritz, was nominated for Juno Award for Best Video.
- 1996 Ordained a Rinzai Buddhist monk.
- 2001 Nagroda Muzyczna Fryderyk, the annual Polish music award, for best foreign album (Ten New Songs).
- 2002 Nominated for Juno Award as Best Songwriter Cohen (with Sharon Robinson) for "Boogie Street", "In My Secret Life", and "You Have Loved Enough").
- 2002 Nominated for the Juno Award for Best Video for "In My Secret Life", directed by Floria Sigismondi. Ten New Songs nominated for Best Pop Album, and he was nominated for Best Artist.
- 2002 SNEP Award Cohen for more than 100,000 copies sold of Ten New Songs in France.
- 2002 Queen Elizabeth II's Golden Jubilee Medal
- 2003 Companion of the Order of Canada, Canada's second highest civilian honour.
- 2004 Inclusion in Canada Reads 2005 with Beautiful Losers.
- 2005 Induction into the Canadian Folk Music Walk of Fame.
- 2006 Induction into the Canadian Songwriters Hall of Fame.
- 2007 Grammy for Album of the Year as a featured artist on Herbie Hancock's River: The Joni Letters.
- 2008 Induction into the Rock and Roll Hall of Fame.
- 2008 Grand Officer of the National Order of Quebec.
- 2009 Long Listed for the Polaris Music Prize for Live in London.
- 2009 Nominated for Mojo Honours Lists for Best Live Act category.
- 2009 Meteor Music Award for Best International Live Performance for his 2008 show in Dublin's IMMA's Royal Hospital Kilmainham.
- 2010 Grammy Lifetime Achievement Award.
- 2010 A second Meteor Music Award for Best International Live Performance for his 2009 show in Dublin's O2.
- 2010 Porin Award in Croatia in category of foreign video programme, for his Live in London DVD.
- 2010 Induction into the Songwriters Hall of Fame.
- 2011 Glenn Gould Prize.
- 2011 Prince of Asturias Awards, Literature, Spain.
- 2012 Inaugural PEN New England Song Lyrics Award for Song Lyrics of Literary Excellence. Chuck Berry received the same award.
- 2012 Prix Denise-Pelletier.
- 2012 Queen Elizabeth II Diamond Jubilee Medal
- 2013 Juno Award, Artist of the Year.
- 2013 Juno Award, Songwriter of the Year.
- 2015 Juno Award, Album of the Year for Popular Problems.
- 2017 Brit Awards, International Male Solo Artist.
- 2017 Juno Award nominations: Artist of the Year, Songwriter of the Year (for "You Want It Darker", "It Seemed the Better Way", "Traveling Light"), Album of the Year and Adult Alternative Album of the Year for You Want It Darker
- 2017 Grammy Award, Best Rock Performance for "You Want it Darker."
