= The Spice-Box of Earth =

1961 book by Leonard Cohen

- First edition
- Author: Leonard Cohen
- Language: English
- Genre: Poetry
- Publisher: McClelland & Stewart
- Publication date: 1961

The Spice-Box of Earth is Canadian poet and songwriter Leonard Cohen's second collection of poetry. It was first published in 1961 by McClelland and Stewart, when Cohen was 27 years old. The book brought the poet a measure of early literary acclaim. One of Cohen's biographers, Ira Nadel, stated that "reaction to the finished book was enthusiastic and admiring. . .[noting that] the critic Robert Weaver found it powerful and declared that Cohen was 'probably the best young poet in English Canada right now.'"

The photograph used on the cover is by Montreal photographer John Max, and has been reused on the cover of the 2006 reprint of Let Us Compare Mythologies.

Following The Spice-Box of Earth, Cohen retreated for several years to the treeless Argolic island of Hydra in Greece, where he began work on the more angular, abrasive poems collected in Flowers for Hitler in 1964.
