= A Ballet of Lepers =

Leonard Cohen novella and short stories

A Ballet of Lepers: A Novel and Stories
- Author: Leonard Cohen
- Cover artist: Kelly Hill (design)
- Language: English
- Publisher: McClelland & Stewart
- Publication date: 11 October 2022
- Publication place: Canada
- Media type: Print (hardback)
- Pages: 272

A Ballet of Lepers: A Novel and Stories is a posthumous collection of fiction by Canadian author and singer-songwriter Leonard Cohen, consisting of the novella A Ballet of Lepers, fifteen short stories and a précis for a play. The collection was edited, with an afterword, by Alexandra Pleshoyano and was published in 2022.

== Themes ==
The titular novella, written at Cohen's childhood home in the Westmount area of Montreal, is narrated by an aimless, solitary bookkeeper of 35 who is renting a room in Stanley Street, Montreal and takes in his grandfather who needs a place to live. The grandfather, whom he has never met before, scorns societal taboos and embraces a liberating exercise of violence.

Themes explored in the novella and stories include "the sacred and profane dimensions of sexual desire; the longing for an ideal woman, capable of a liberating love; a search for freedom in a world of limitations and boundaries; the challenge—and even incapacity—to embrace commitment; feelings of alienation; the dread flowing from a sense of unworthiness coupled with an aspiration for the transcendent and the beautiful."

== Publishing history ==
Although Cohen wrote the novella in 1956-7, some years before writing his first published novel The Favourite Game, it was only published posthumously in 2022. Cohen once called A Ballet of Lepers "probably a better novel" than The Favourite Game, but despite his best efforts failed to get it published. The manuscript of the novella, along with a collection of short stories and plays, is kept in the Leonard Cohen archive at the University of Toronto. There are four drafts, the second and most complete of which was selected for publication.

The stories, written (mostly) between 1956 and 1960, were also previously unpublished. They are titled: "Saint Jig", "O.K. Herb, O.K. Flo", "Signals", "Polly", "A Hundred Suits from Russia", "Ceremonies", Mister Euemer Episodes", "The Shaving Ritual", "Lullaby", "A Week is a Very Long Time", "The Jukebox Heart", "David Who?", "Short Story on Greek Island", "ive had lots of pets" and "Strange Boy with a Hammer". The précis for a play is titled "Trade".
