= Popular Problems =

2014 studio album by Leonard Cohen

Studio album by Leonard Cohen
- Released: September 19, 2014
- Recorded: 2013–14
- Genres: Contemporary folk, folk pop, soft rock
- Length: 35:56
- Label: Columbia
- Producer: Patrick Leonard

Leonard Cohen chronology
Old Ideas (2012)	Popular Problems (2014)	Live in Dublin (2014)

Popular Problems is the thirteenth studio album by Canadian singer-songwriter Leonard Cohen, released on September 19, 2014 in Friday-release countries (such as France and Ireland) and on September 22, 2014 elsewhere.

== Overview ==
Most of the songs were new, though Cohen did debut "Born in Chains" onstage in 2010 and "My Oh My" was played during a soundcheck the same year.

The 2010 version of "Born in Chains" differs radically in terms of arrangements and singing compared to the 2014 studio version, and the song itself was first performed as early as 1985, during an (unofficially recorded) soundcheck in Europe. The early version used earlier lyrics set to the music which later become the song "I Can't Forget", released on Cohen's 1988 record I'm Your Man. Through the years, Cohen referred to the song as "Taken Out of Egypt", reciting it on show in 1988, and humming it to the new melody in 2005 documentary Leonard Cohen: I'm Your Man.

"A Street" was recited by Cohen in 2006, during promotion of his book of poetry Book of Longing, and later printed twice, as "A Street" in the March 2, 2009 issue of The New Yorker magazine, and as "Party's Over" in Everyman's Library edition of Cohen's Poems and Songs in 2011. Both versions include a verse referring to 9/11.

"Nevermind" was published as the poem in 2005 on The Leonard Cohen Files website, and in Book of Longing in 2006. In 2015, it was used as the opening credits theme of the second season of the HBO series True Detective.

== Critical reception ==
Professional ratings
Aggregate scores
Source	Rating
AnyDecentMusic?	8.2/10
Metacritic	86/100
Review scores
Source	Rating
AllMusic	4/5 stars
The A.V. Club	B+
Cuepoint (Expert Witness)	B+
The Daily Telegraph	5/5 stars
The Guardian	4/5 stars
The Independent	5/5 stars
NME	8/10
Pitchfork	7.6/10
Q	4/5 stars
Uncut	9/10

Upon its release the album received uniformly positive reviews from critics, with Metacritic tallying 26 positive reviews for an aggregate score of 86, designated on the site as "universal acclaim". Thom Jurek of AllMusic wrote that, at 80 years old, "Cohen not only has plenty left in the tank, but is at his most confident and committed" and called it his best album since 1992's The Future. The New York Times gave a moderately positive review, calling Cohen "one of rock’s most profound aphorists" but dismissing the "bouncy country" production of "Did I Ever Love You" as the album's "major misstep". Neil McCormick of The Daily Telegraph called the album "a masterpiece".

The album was a shortlisted Juno Award nominee for Adult Alternative Album of the Year at the Juno Awards of 2015.

== Commercial performance ==
The album peaked at number one on the Canadian Albums Chart, selling 20,000 copies in its first week. In its second week, the album fell to number two behind Bryan Adams's Tracks of My Years, with sales of 10,500. As of January 2015, Popular Problems has sold 80,000 copies in Canada.

In the United States, the album debuted at No. 15 on Billboard 200, No. 1 on Folk Albums and No. 4 on Top Rock Albums, with 20,000 copies sold. The album has sold 67,000 copies in the US as of May 2015.

== Track listing ==
Written by Leonard Cohen and Patrick Leonard, except where indicated

No.	Title	Writer(s)	Length
1.	"Slow"		3:25
2.	"Almost Like the Blues"		3:28
3.	"Samson in New Orleans"		4:39
4.	"A Street"	Cohen, Anjani Thomas	3:32
5.	"Did I Ever Love You"		4:10
6.	"My Oh My"		3:36
7.	"Nevermind"		4:39
8.	"Born in Chains"	Cohen	4:55
9.	"You Got Me Singing"		3:31
Total length:			35:55

== Personnel ==
- Leonard Cohen – vocals
- James Harrah – guitar
- Joe Ayoub – bass
- Alexandru Bublitchi – violin
- Patrick Leonard – keyboards
- Brian MacLeod – drums
- Charlean Carmon – backing vocals
- Dana Glover – backing vocals
- Donna De Lory – backing vocals

== Chart positions ==
=== Weekly charts ===
Chart (2014)	Peak position
Australian Albums (ARIA)	6
Austrian Albums (Ö3 Austria)	1
Belgian Albums (Ultratop Flanders)	1
Belgian Albums (Ultratop Wallonia)	2
Canadian Albums (Billboard)	1
Czech Albums (ČNS IFPI)	1
Danish Albums (Hitlisten)	1
Dutch Albums (Album Top 100)	1
Finnish Albums (Suomen virallinen lista)	2
French Albums (SNEP)	2
German Albums (Offizielle Top 100)	4
Hungarian Albums (MAHASZ)	6
Irish Albums (IRMA)	2
Italian Albums (FIMI)	5
New Zealand Albums (RMNZ)	1
Norwegian Albums (VG-lista)	1
Polish Albums (ZPAV)	3
Portuguese Albums (AFP)	1
Scottish Albums (Official Charts)	3
Spanish Albums (Promusicae)	3
Swedish Albums (Sverigetopplistan)	5
Swiss Albums (Schweizer Hitparade)	1
UK Albums (Official Charts)	5
UK Album Downloads (Official Charts)	12
US Billboard 200	15
US Americana/Folk Albums (Billboard)	1
US Top Rock Albums (Billboard)	4

=== Year-end charts ===
Chart (2014)	Position
Austrian Albums (Ö3 Austria)	37
Belgian Albums (Ultratop Flanders)	27
Belgian Albums (Ultratop Wallonia)	48
Canadian Albums (Billboard)	24
Dutch Albums (Album Top 100)	28
French Albums (SNEP)	80
Swedish Albums (Sverigetopplistan)	93
Swiss Albums (Schweizer Hitparade)	28

Chart (2015)	Position
Belgian Albums (Ultratop Flanders)	112

== Certifications ==
Region	Certification	Certified units/sales
Austria (IFPI Austria)	Gold	7,500^{*}
Canada (Music Canada)	Platinum	80,000^{^}
Denmark (IFPI Danmark)	Platinum	20,000^{^}
France (SNEP)	Gold	50,000^{*}
Hungary (MAHASZ)	Gold	1,000^{^}
Poland (ZPAV)	Platinum	20,000^{*}
Switzerland (IFPI Switzerland)	Gold	10,000^{^}
United Kingdom (BPI)	Silver	60,000^{*}
United States	—	67,000
^{*} Sales figures based on certification alone.^{^} Shipments figures based on certification alone.

== Release history ==
Date	Region
19 September 2014	Friday-release countries (such as France)
22 September 2014	Worldwide
