= Freda Guttman =

Canadian artist

Freda Claire Guttman Bain (born 1934) is a Canadian multidisciplinary artist and activist.

== Biography ==
Guttman was born March 16, 1934, in Montreal, Quebec. She studied briefly at McGill University, where she met and dated Leonard Cohen. She would go on to illustrate Cohen's first book of poetry, Let Us Compare Mythologies. Guttman moved to Rhode Island, where she received a degree from the Rhode Island School of Design in 1956. She also studied at Concordia University and the Saidye Bronfman Centre. From 1972 to 1983, she taught at Concordia University in Montreal.

== Work ==
Guttman's work combines elements of politics, economics, sociology and ecology. Her work has been exhibited in Canada, the United States, Europe, Mexico and Nicaragua.

Since the early 1980s, Guttman has been involved as an activist in a number of political causes.

== Exhibitions ==
- 1976 : Freda Guttman Bain, Galerie Powerhouse, Montréal
- 1986: Guatemala! Le chemin de la guerre (multimedia works), Chambre Blanche
- 1989: The Global Menu / Le Menu Global, A Space Gallery, Toronto
- 1989: Cris et chuchotements, DAZIBAO, Montreal
- 1990: The Global Menu / Le Menu Global, OBORO, Montreal
- 1995: Cassandra : un opéra en quatre actes, OBORO, Montreal
- 1998: Cassandra : un opéra en quatre actes, Galerie Sequence, Chicoutimi

== Collections ==
Guttman's work is included in the collections of:

- the National Gallery of Canada,
- the Musée national des beaux-arts du Québec
- the Agnes Etherington Art Centre
- the Art Gallery of Guelph
