= Thanks for the Dance =

Studio album by Leonard Cohen
- Released: November 22, 2019
- Recorded: 2016
- Length: 29:17
- Label: Columbia; Legacy
- Producer: Adam Cohen

Leonard Cohen chronology
You Want It Darker (2016)	Thanks for the Dance (2019)

Singles from Thanks for the Dance
- 1. "The Goal" Released: September 19, 2018; 2. "Happens to the Heart" Released: October 24, 2014; 3. "Moving On" Released: January 29, 2021

Thanks for the Dance is the fifteenth and final studio album by Canadian singer-songwriter Leonard Cohen, released posthumously through Columbia Records and Legacy Recordings on November 22, 2019. It is the first release following Cohen's death in November 2016, and includes contributions from various musicians, such as Daniel Lanois, Beck, Jennifer Warnes, Damien Rice and Leslie Feist. The song "The Goal" was released with the announcement of the album, on September 20, 2019.

Described as a "continuation" of Cohen's previous studio album, You Want It Darker (2016), the album's vocal tracks were recorded during the same sessions, with Cohen's son and album producer Adam Cohen noting that the album should not be considered an album of "discarded songs or B sides".

== Background ==
The songs on the album comprise "sketches" left over from the sessions for Cohen's final studio album You Want It Darker that were finished by Cohen's son Adam Cohen in a "garage near his father's old house". Regarding the tracks, Adam Cohen noted: "Had we had more time and had [Leonard] been more robust, we would have gotten to them. [We had] conversations about what instrumentation and what feelings he wanted the completed work to evoke – sadly, the fact that I would be completing them without him was given."

The title song, "Thanks for the Dance", was originally recorded by Anjani for her 2007 album Blue Alert, produced and written by Cohen, and composed by Anjani, while Cohen's own version of the song was recorded later.

Some songs were years in the making in Cohen's notebooks and home studio. "The Night of Santiago" is an adaptation of Federico Garcia Lorca's poem "The Unfaithful Housewife". Probably started at the same time as Cohen's 1986 single "Take This Waltz" and never finished, the lyrics were much later published in Book of Longing as "The Faithless Wife". Adam Cohen finally set it to music: "I'd heard it under construction for years, on the front lawn or while we were having coffee or dinner, and I'd always begged him to attempt to write music to it. In a weakened state, he said, 'Look, I'll just recite the poem to a certain tempo and you go ahead and you write the music and try to tell the story."

The only Cohen's original composition on the album, "The Hills" was previously broadcast as a demo track, titled "The Book of Longing" (based on the opening poem of Book of Longing), during Cohen's interview at the KCRW radio station in 2006, along with his own musical version of "Puppets", also originally published as the poem in the same book (here released to Adam Cohen's music).

Some tracks were composed around Leonard Cohen's recitations. "Listen to the Hummingbird" used Cohen's impromptu recitation of the partial poem at his last public appearance to promote You Want It Darker album on October 13, 2016. The full text of the poem was later published in the posthumous book The Flame, as well the poems "Moving On" and "Happens to the Heart".

"The Goal" is a 1998 poem published in Book of Longing, already set to music by Anjani and released on her 2014 album I Came to Love. Here Cohen's own recitation is set to Adam Cohen's music.

"It's Torn", originally another Cohen's collaboration with Sharon Robinson, here in the version produced and additionally composed by Adam Cohen, included guitar effects by Daniel Lanois, who in 2021 released his own version of the track, titled "Torn Again", using Leonard Cohen's original voice track.

== Critical reception ==
Professional ratings
Aggregate scores
Source	Rating
AnyDecentMusic?	8.1/10
Metacritic	84/100
Review scores
Source	Rating
AllMusic	4/5 stars
American Songwriter	4/5 stars
Consequence of Sound	B+
The Daily Telegraph	5/5 stars
The Guardian	5/5 stars
The Independent	4/5 stars
The Line of Best Fit	10/10
Now	4/5
Pitchfork	6.9/10
Rolling Stone	4/5 stars

Thanks for the Dance received critical acclaim. At Metacritic, which assigns a normalized rating out of 100 to reviews from mainstream critics, the album received an average score of 84, which indicates "universal acclaim", based on 25 reviews.

Rolling Stone gave the album 4 stars, praising the album and saying it is "a magnificent parting shot that's also that exceptionally rare thing — a posthumous work as alive, challenging, and essential as anything issued in the artist's lifetime".

The album was a Juno Award nominee for Adult Alternative Album of the Year at the Juno Awards of 2020.

== Track listing ==
All lyrics are written by Leonard Cohen.

No.	Title	Music	Length
1.	"Happens to the Heart"	Adam Cohen	4:33
2.	"Moving On"	A. Cohen; Patrick Leonard	3:11
3.	"The Night of Santiago"	A. Cohen	4:15
4.	"Thanks for the Dance"	Anjani Thomas	4:13
5.	"It's Torn"	A. Cohen; Sharon Robinson	2:57
6.	"The Goal"	A. Cohen	1:12
7.	"Puppets"	A. Cohen	2:39
8.	"The Hills"	L. Cohen	4:17
9.	"Listen to the Hummingbird"	A. Cohen	2:00
Total length:			29:17

== Personnel ==
- Leonard Cohen – vocals (1–9)
- Pietro Amato – horns (8)
- Erika Angell – vocals (8)
- Kobi Arditi – trombone (1)
- Avi Avital – mandolin (2)
- Beck – Jew's harp (3), acoustic guitar (3)
- Romain Bly – trumpet (1)
- Howard Bilerman – recording engineer (8)
- Charlie Bisharat – violin (1)
- Jacob Braun – cello (1)
- David Campbell – conductor (1)
- Cantus Domus – choir (7)
- Matt Chamberlain – drums (8), percussion (8)
- Michael Chaves – bass (1,2,3,4,5,7,9), acoustic guitar (1,5,8), claps (3), drums (4), percussion (5), electric guitar (7,8), synthesizer (8)
- Adam Cohen – acoustic guitar (3), claps (3), synthesizer (7), vocals (9)
- Stewart Cole – trumpet (4), flugelhorn (4), clarinet (4), modular synthesizer (4)
- Carlos de Jacoba – acoustic guitar (3)
- André Deritter – conductor (1)
- George Doering – baritone ukulele (4)
- Andrew Duckles – viola (1)
- Leslie Feist – vocals (4)
- Caimin Gilmore – double bass (1)
- Larry Goldings – flute (1), piano (9)
- Steve Hassett – vocals (9)
- Rob Humphreys – percussion (1)
- Daniel Lanois – piano (1,3), vocals (3), guitar effects (5)
- Lilah Larson – vocals (8)
- Patrick Leonard – piano (6)
- Javier Mas – Spanish laud (1,4), acoustic guitar (2,3,4,6,9), claps (3)
- Dustin O'Halloran – piano (5)
- Georg Paltz – clarinet (1)
- Silvia Perez Cruz – vocals (2,3)
- Zac Rae – felt piano (1,3), ride cymbal (2), Wurlitzer (2,3), vibraphone (2,4), toy piano (2), synthesizer (3,5), kick drum (3), organ (4), zither (5), strings (6,7), piano (7), bells (7), keyboard (9)
- Zoe Randell – vocals (9)
- Mariza Rizou – vocals (2)
- Richard Reed Parry – bass (3)
- Damien Rice – vocals (9)
- Sharon Robinson – percussion (5), vocals (5)
- Shaar Hashomayim Men's Choir – choir (7)
- Jason Sharp – saxophone (8)
- Jessica Staveley-Taylor – vocals (9)
- Mishka Stein – bass (8)
- Aaron Sterling – cymbals (4)
- Dave Stone – string bass (1)
- Alistair Sung – cello (1)
- Molly Sweeney – vocals (8)
- Jamie Thompson – drums (8)
- Maaike van der Linde – flute (1)
- Marlies van Gangelen – oboe (1)
- Josefina Vergara – violin (1)
- Mariam Wallentin – vocals (9)
- Jennifer Warnes – vocals (4)
- Patrick Watson – organ (8), synthesizer (8 and 9), horn arrangement (8)

== Charts ==
=== Weekly charts ===
Weekly chart performance for Thanks for the Dance
Chart (2019)	Peak position
Australian Albums (ARIA)	11
Austrian Albums (Ö3 Austria)	2
Belgian Albums (Ultratop Flanders)	1
Belgian Albums (Ultratop Wallonia)	10
Canadian Albums (Billboard)	1
Croatian International Albums (HDU)	1
Czech Albums (ČNS IFPI)	7
Danish Albums (Hitlisten)	3
Dutch Albums (Album Top 100)	5
Finnish Albums (Suomen virallinen lista)	17
French Albums (SNEP)	15
German Albums (Offizielle Top 100)	5
Hungarian Albums (MAHASZ)	23
Irish Albums (IRMA)	6
Italian Albums (FIMI)	11
Lithuanian Albums (AGATA)	58
New Zealand Albums (RMNZ)	4
Norwegian Albums (VG-lista)	2
Polish Albums (ZPAV)	5
Portuguese Albums (AFP)	1
Scottish Albums (OCC)	6
Spanish Albums (Promusicae)	7
Swedish Albums (Sverigetopplistan)	6
Swiss Albums (Schweizer Hitparade)	4
UK Albums (OCC)	7
US Billboard 200	61

=== Year-end charts ===
2019 year-end chart performance for Thanks for the Dance
Chart (2019)	Position
Austrian Albums (Ö3 Austria)	28
Belgian Albums (Ultratop Flanders)	33
Belgian Albums (Ultratop Wallonia)	157
Dutch Albums (Album Top 100)	93
French Albums (SNEP)	121
German Albums (Offizielle Top 100)	93
Polish Albums (ZPAV)	91
Swiss Albums (Schweizer Hitparade)	56

2020 year-end chart performance for Thanks for the Dance
Chart (2020)	Position
Belgian Albums (Ultratop Flanders)	73
German Albums (Offizielle Top 100)	63
Swiss Albums (Schweizer Hitparade)	51

== Certifications ==
Certifications for Thanks for the Dance
Region	Certification	Certified units/sales
Austria (IFPI Austria)	Gold	7,500^{‡}
Poland (ZPAV)	Gold	10,000^{‡}
^{‡} Sales+streaming figures based on certification alone.
