= Book of Longing =

2006 book of poetry by Leonard Cohen

- Author: Leonard Cohen
- Genre: Poetry
- Publisher: McClelland and Stewart
- Publication date: 2006
- Media type: Print

Book of Longing was the first new poetry book by Leonard Cohen since 1984's Book of Mercy. First published in 2006 by McClelland and Stewart, Book of Longing contains 167 previously unpublished poems and drawings, mostly written at a Zen monastery on Mount Baldy in California, where Cohen lived from 1994 to 1999, and in India, which he visited regularly during the late 1990s. The book also incorporates a number of poems written after his 1978 book, Death of a Lady's Man (not to be confused with his 1977 album, Death of a Ladies' Man). These presumably were left out of his 1984 Book of Mercy, which contained only psalm-like meditations. Book of Longing also collects some of the lyrics to songs from the albums Ten New Songs (2001) and Dear Heather (2004). Many of these poems were first published at The Blackening Pages of The Leonard Cohen Files website.

In 2007, the American composer Philip Glass premiered his work Book of Longing. Song Cycle Based on the Poetry and Artwork of Leonard Cohen, in which he set 23 of the book's poems to music. Some poems included Cohen's spoken word. The work was co-commissioned by Luminato Festival under the artistic direction of Chris Lorway in Toronto Canada, Australia's 2008 Adelaide Festival under the artistic direction of Brett Sheehy, and Barbican Centre in London, and premiered at Luminato in 2007. It was subsequently performed at various venues in the United States, Australia, United Kingdom and Europe. At the Barbican Centre in London in October 2007, Cohen joined Glass onstage for a pre-concert discussion. The double-CD was released in December 2007.
