= Selected Poems 1956–1968 =

Book by Leonard Cohen

Selected Poems 1956-1968
- US edition
- Author: Leonard Cohen
- Language: English
- Genre: Poetry
- Publisher: McClelland & Stewart
- Publication date: 1968
- Pages: 245
- ISBN: 0-7710-2212-3

Selected Poems 1956–1968 is Leonard Cohen's fifth collection of poetry, first published in 1968 by McClelland & Stewart in Canada, and his first book to be published after his debut as a recording artist in December 1967. It was also the first of Cohen's poetry books to be published in the US (by Viking), and offered twenty new poems along with a selection from earlier volumes. Many were hand-picked by Cohen's long-time girlfriend Marianne Ihlen. Published in June, the work sold 20,000 copies over the summer.
