= Ira Nadel =

American-Canadian writer

- Born: Ira Bruce Nadel; July 22, 1943 (age 83); Rahway, New Jersey
- Education: Rutgers University; Cornell University
- Occupation: Professor of English at University of British Columbia
- Known for: Biography, literary criticism
- Notable work: Various Positions: A Life of Leonard Cohen; Leon Uris: Life of a Best Seller; Joyce and the Jews: Culture and the Text
- Awards: Fellow of the Royal Society of Canada; Killiam Award

Ira Bruce Nadel (born July 22, 1943) is an American-Canadian biographer, literary critic and James Joyce scholar, and a distinguished professor at the University of British Columbia. He has written books on the twentieth-century Modernists, especially Ezra Pound and Joyce, biographies of Leonard Cohen and Leon Uris, and on Jewish-American authors. He has won Canadian literary awards, and has edited and written the introduction to a number of scholarly books and period pieces. He is a critic of the Olympic torch relay as a legacy of the Nazis.

== Life and career ==
Nadel was born on July 22, 1943, in Rahway, New Jersey, the son of Isaac David and Francis (Sofman) Nadel. He received a BA in 1965 and an MA in 1967 from Rutgers University, New Jersey, and a PhD in English in 1970 from Cornell University. He joined the University of British Columbia as an assistant professor, was promoted to associate professor in 1977, and then to professor of English in 1985. He was chair of the Department of English graduate program from 1992 to 1995. As of 2004, he was a coeditor of the David Mamet Review, an advisory board member of The Journal of Modern Literature and Joyce Studies Annual, and an editorial board member of English Literature in Transition and Autobiographical/Biographical Studies. He is known in British Columbia as a long-serving book critic for CBC Radio's afternoon show.

=== Personal life and views ===
Nadel's first marriage on June 5, 1966, ended when his wife Susan Matties Nadel died on February 23, 1975. He has two children from his second marriage, on July 4, 1976, to Josephine Margolis, a lawyer. He has protested the use of the Olympic torch as a legacy from the Nazis. Nadel considers the torch relay a fabrication by the Nazis in 1936 in Germany, and not associated with the ancient Olympics.

== Work ==
Nadel's book, Leon Uris: Life of a Best Seller, was the first full-length biography of Uris. It was based on the archives at Harry Ransom Humanities Research Center at the University of Texas, Austin and interviews with Uris's family. Nadel saw Uris's work as attacking antisemitism with a fictional heroic Jewish past, but broadening the appeal to a non-Jewish readership. Nadel revealed that Uris lived the life he described in a fictional setting, with many war experiences and travel to dangerous spots.

Nadel published Joyce and the Jews in 1989, the first book to appear in print tackling the topic. The book explored both Joyce's personal relations with Jews and the influence of Judaic motifs on his writing. Nadel also looked at references to the Talmud in Joyce's Finnegans Wake. As a critic focusing on the influence of Jews and Judaism on Joyce, Nadel did not address the centrality of the Jewishness of Leopold Bloom, one of the central characters of Joyce's masterpiece, Ulysses.^{:4} Nadel did note the shared impact of the concept of exodus on Jews and on Joyce, a voluntary exile from an Ireland then under the dominion of England.^{:268}

Nadel's biography of David Mamet, David Mamet: A Life in the Theatre, the first such, qualified the playwright's own description of an unhappy childhood. It also tried to place Mamet's prolific output as an artist in a sociobiographical context, in an expanding arc from immediate family to Euro-American cultural influence.^{:285} Nadel has also published a biography of Leonard Cohen, the singer, songwriter, poet and novelist, titled Various Positions: A Life of Leonard Cohen. He has also written about Ezra Pound.

Nadel co-edited The Victorian Muse, Gertrude Stein, The Making of Literature and a collection of previously unpublished Ezra Pound letters. He has also edited the Cambridge Companion to Ezra Pound, and organized conferences about the work of Joyce. He has edited an Oxford reprint of the American classic, The Education of Henry Adams, and Iolani: or, Tahiti as it was, by Wilkie Collins. Nadel is also the author of Tom Stoppard: A Life, on the prolific British theater playwright.

== Literary style ==
Nadel depended on primary material and contemporaneous newspaper reports for his biography of Mamet. He focused on facts and less on interpretation and analysis.^{:284} Tom Stoppard also never interacted with Nadel during the writing of Stoppard's biography, and actually commented on "Ira somebody uninvitedly writing" his biography. To write about Ezra Pound, the author traveled to London to access the newly released MI 5 archives on the poet. For Cohen's biography, Nadel did interview his subject and obtained access to unpublished material and authorization to write the biography. Nadel's philosophy of writing biographies is that biographers need not interact with their subjects, but do need to appreciate their subjects' worth. As per Nadel, a biography should tell the reader who the subject is, not what the subject has achieved. He is concerned that the briefer modes of communication encouraged by social networking media such as Twitter may change how we capture and narrate others' lives. He speculates biographies may become packed into small fragments, as self-expression in general gets condensed by the influence of the new media.

In his literary criticism, Nadel analyzes text content. He thinks of texts as riddles, and in writing about Joyce, has looked at intertextual connections between Charles Dickens's Our Mutual Friend and Joyce's Finnegans Wake.^{:8}

== Awards ==
- Fellow of the Royal Society of Canada in 1996.
- Distinguished University Scholar, University of British Columbia.
- Killiam Faculty Research Fellowship in 1994.
- Killiam Research Prize in 1992.
- UBC Medal for Canadian Biography in 1996.
- Times of London top seven best books in theater and film in 2008 for David Mamet: A Life in the Theatre.

== Works ==
Authored:

- Biography: Fiction, Fact & Form (London: Macmillan, 1984)
- Joyce and the Jews: Culture and Texts (London: Macmillan, 1989)
- Leonard Cohen (ECW Press, 1994)
- Various Positions, A Life of Leonard Cohen (Random House, 1996)
- Tom Stoppard: A Life (St. Martin's Press, 2002)
- Ezra Pound: A Literary Life (NY: Palgrave/ Macmillan, 2004)
- David Mamet: A Life in the Theatre (NY: Palgrave/ Macmillan, 2008)
- Leon Uris: Life of a Best Seller (Austin: University of Texas Press, 2010)
- Critical Companion to Philip Roth (Facts on File, 2011)
- Philip Roth: A Counterlife (Oxford University Press, 2021)
- The American Sentence: From Pulpit to Pulp Fiction (Bloomsbury Academic, 2025)

Editor of:

- Wilkie Collins, Ioláni, or Tahiti as it was (Princeton University Press, 1999)
- Henry Adams, The Education of Henry Adams (Oxford University Press, 1999)
- The Cambridge Companion to Ezra Pound (Cambridge University Press, 1999)
- Redefining the Modern: Essays on Literature and Society in Honor of Joseph Wiesenfarth (Madison: Fairleigh Dickinson University Press, 2004)

Wrote introduction to

- The Dead Secret by Wilkie Collins.
- Iolani, or Tahiti as it was by Wilkie Collins.
