= Flowers for Hitler =

1964 poetry collection by Leonard Cohen

- First edition
- Author: Leonard Cohen
- Language: English
- Genre: Poetry
- Publisher: McClelland & Stewart
- Publication date: 1964

Flowers for Hitler is Canadian poet and composer Leonard Cohen's third collection of poetry, first published in 1964 by McClelland & Stewart.

Like other artworks regarding Adolf Hitler as a subject, it was somewhat controversial in its day. Cohen's original title, Opium and Hitler, was rejected by the publisher. The inscription on its initial page reads "In an earlier time this would be called Sunshine for Napoleon, and earlier still it would have been called Walls for Genghis Khan." It features an opening quote from Primo Levi's Survival in Auschwitz.

Flowers for Hitler contains 95 rhymed and free-verse poems, avant-garde texts, and pictorial elements. It was the first of his books to include Cohen's drawings. Only 20 of the poems directly address World War II and the Holocaust. In the poems, Cohen explores the banality of evil, "using the Holocaust as the highest known point of human evil". There are few allusions to the Bible in Flowers for Hitler, unlike Cohen's previous books.

Critic Sandra Djwa wrote that Flowers for Hitler "is a movement from a qualified acceptance of the romantic ideal as it is embodied in art ... to the decadent romanticism of a fin de siecle aesthetic in which the ugly replaces the beautiful as the inspiration for art".
