= Let Us Compare Mythologies =

1956 poetry book by Leonard Cohen

- First edition
- Author: Leonard Cohen
- Illustrator: Freda Guttman
- Publisher: Contact Press
- Publication date: 1956

Let Us Compare Mythologies is the first poetry book by Canadian poet and songwriter Leonard Cohen. Written in 1956, shortly after Cohen left McGill University where he studied English literature, it was first published as part of the McGill Poetry Series operated by Louis Dudek. In 2007, the book returned to print in a 50th anniversary facsimile edition, published by Ecco Press.

Published as the inaugural volume of the McGill Poetry Series in an edition of about 400.
