= The Favourite Game =

Leonard Cohen novel

- First edition
- Author: Leonard Cohen
- Cover artist: Barry Trengrove (design)
- Language: English
- Publisher: Secker & Warburg
- Publication date: 1963
- Publication place: Canada
- Media type: Print (Hardback & Paperback)
- Pages: 223 pp

The Favourite Game is the first novel by Leonard Cohen. It was first published by Secker and Warburg in the fall of 1963.

In 1959, Cohen was awarded a $2,000 Canada Council grant, which he used to live cheaply in London and on the Greek island of Hydra while he wrote the novel, then titled Beauty at Close Quarters. When he returned to Canada in 1960, it was rejected by his publisher, McClelland & Stewart. Jack McClelland was concerned about the autobiographical content and found the novel to be tedious and preoccupied with sex. He suggested major revisions, without guaranteeing publication once those revisions were made.

Cohen placed the book with publishers in England and America who requested a shorter length, so he cut the book in half. He wrote, "anyone with an ear will know I've torn apart orchestras to arrive at my straight, melodic line."

The Favourite Game was published in England in October, 1963, and in New York in September, 1964. The book was only available as an import in Canada until McClelland & Stewart published a New Canadian Library paperback edition in 1970. The current Canadian edition includes an afterword by Paul Quarrington.

A film adaptation of the novel, directed by Bernar Hebert, was released in 2003.
