= Book of Mercy =

Book of poetry by Leonard Cohen

- First edition
- Author: Leonard Cohen
- Publisher: McClelland & Stewart
- Publication date: 1984
- ISBN: 0771022069

Book of Mercy is a poetry book by Canadian author, poet and singer-songwriter Leonard Cohen, published by McClelland and Stewart, and repackaged in March 2010. Its original publication was in 1984. Book of Mercy is considered a companion volume to Cohen's poetry collection, Book of Longing (published in 2006). The book is often referred to as a book of contemporary psalms. The poems are numbered rather than titled. Book of Mercy contains fifty poems. The topics are often spiritual or religious in nature.

According to Penguin Random House, "the poems in Book of Mercy brim with praise, despair, anger, doubt and trust. Speaking from the heart of the modern world, yet in tones that resonate with an older devotional tradition, these verses give voice to our deepest, most powerful intuitions." Cohen uses both traditional and modern forms of writing.

In the year of the book's original publication, in an interview with Robert Sward, Cohen called it "a secret book for me...a little book of prayer that is only valuable to someone who needs it at the time. It isn't aimed in the same way that a song is aimed."

"It was written during an intense moment of reassessment of his life and art and remains his sole effort to publish a book of psalms. Book of Mercy allows us to witness the struggle of a soul engaged in what Cohen described as 'a sacred kind of conversation.' The reputation of this meditative collection has grown steadily, and the book is now widely considered one of the finest compilations of confession and spiritual longing ever written."

Book of Mercy is said to have inspired the production of Cohen's studio album Various Positions.
