= Live in London (Leonard Cohen album) =

Live album by Leonard Cohen
- Released: March 31, 2009
- Recorded: July 17, 2008
- Venue: The O2 Arena (London)
- Genres: Soft rock, contemporary folk, folk pop
- Length: 151:28
- Label: Columbia
- Producers: Steven Berkowitz, Edward Sanders

Leonard Cohen chronology
Dear Heather (2004)	Live in London (2009)	Live at the Isle of Wight 1970 (2009)

Professional ratings
Review scores
Source	Rating
Allmusic	link
Billboard	favorable link
Entertainment Weekly	A− link
The Independent	link
musicOMH	link
PopMatters	8/10 link
Robert Christgau	A link
The Sunday Times	link
Slant	link
Uncut	link

Live in London is a (double) live album by Canadian singer-songwriter Leonard Cohen. It was released on CD by Columbia/Sony March 31, 2009, is his 18th album, and his first live release since Field Commander Cohen: Tour of 1979 in 2001. A DVD of the performance was simultaneously released by Columbia/Sony.

== Background ==
Part of the reason Cohen, who was 73 at the time, went on tour in 2008 was to rebuild his finances after being swindled by his manager, Kelley Lynch. Sylvie Simmons explains in her 2012 biography on Cohen that Lynch "took care of Leonard's business affairs...[and was] not simply his manager but a close friend, almost part of the family." However, Simmons notes that in late 2004, Cohen's daughter Lorca began to suspect Lynch of financial impropriety, and when Cohen checked his bank accounts, he noticed that he had unknowingly paid a credit card bill of Lynch's for $75,000 and also found that most of the money in his accounts was gone (including money from his retirement accounts and charitable trust funds). Cohen would discover that this theft had actually begun as early as 1996 when Lynch started selling Cohen's music publishing rights despite the fact that Cohen had no financial incentive to do so at the time. Cohen, who was on a five-year retreat at the Zen center Mount Baldy near Los Angeles at the time, remained oblivious.

On 8 October 2005, Cohen sued Kelley Lynch, alleging that she had misappropriated over US$5 million from Cohen's retirement fund leaving only $150,000. Cohen was sued in turn by other former business associates. These events placed him in the public spotlight, including a cover feature on him with the headline "Devastated!" in Canada's Maclean's magazine. In March 2006, Cohen won a civil suit and was awarded US$9 million by a Los Angeles County superior court. Lynch, however, ignored the suit and did not respond to a subpoena issued for her financial records. As a result, it was widely reported that Cohen might never be able to collect the awarded amount.

In the meantime, Cohen published a book of poetry, prose and drawings called Book of Longing in 2006 and produced Anjani's 2006 album Blue Alert (he also provided lyrics for the songs). Cohen was also inducted into the Rock and Roll Hall of Fame in 2008. In his book Leonard Cohen: A Remarkable Life, biographer Anthony Reynolds observes that throughout the ordeal, Cohen remained calm: "In public, at least, Cohen did seem remarkably sanguine about the loss. He was never angry or accusatory, and his stock answer to the calamity was the dry one-liner, 'It's enough to put a dent in your mood' but when pushed he admitted, 'I don't know what helped me deal with it...I guess it just hasn't hit me yet.'" Cohen, who had always professed to interviewers how much he enjoyed the discipline imposed by hard work, recognized the economic necessity of getting back on the road and announced a tour in January 2008. The first show took place at the Fredericton Playhouse in New Brunswick. Cohen played dates in Canada and Europe to enthusiastic crowds who were delighted to see him on stage again.

Live in London is Cohen's first full concert show release as well as his first released DVD. The album was recorded July 17, 2008, at London's O2 Arena, and was released in both DVD and as a two-CD set. The album was long listed for the Polaris Music Prize. Cohen's humility and self-deprecating sense of humor is evident in the between-song banter throughout the London performance, with him telling the audience, "It's been a long time since I stood on a stage in London. It was about 14 or 15 years ago. I was 60 years old, just a kid with a crazy dream. Since then I've taken a lot of Prozac, Paxil, Wellbutrin, Effexor, Ritalin, Focalin. I've also studied deeply in the philosophies of the religions but cheerfulness kept breaking through."

== Reception ==
Mark Deming of AllMusic writes, "Cohen may have a reputation as one of the most dour performers in contemporary music, but his between-song patter is charmingly droll, and he finds a passion and a humanity in his songs that sets them apart from their studio counterparts."

== Track listing ==
All tracks written by Leonard Cohen, except where noted

Disc one
No.	Title	Writer(s)	Length
1.	"Dance Me to the End of Love" (from Various Positions (1984))		6:20
2.	"The Future" (from The Future (1992))		7:20
3.	"Ain't No Cure for Love" (from I'm Your Man (1988))		6:16
4.	"Bird on the Wire" (from Songs from a Room (1969))		6:14
5.	"Everybody Knows" (from I'm Your Man (1988))	Cohen, Sharon Robinson	5:52
6.	"In My Secret Life" (from Ten New Songs (2001))	Cohen, Robinson	5:02
7.	"Who by Fire" (from New Skin for the Old Ceremony (1974))		6:35
8.	"Hey, That's No Way to Say Goodbye" (from Songs of Leonard Cohen (1967))		3:47
9.	"Anthem" (from The Future (1992))		7:20
10.	"Introduction"		1:29
11.	"Tower of Song" (from I'm Your Man (1988))		7:07
12.	"Suzanne" (from Songs of Leonard Cohen (1967))		3:46
13.	"The Gypsy's Wife" (from Recent Songs (1979))		6:42
Total length:			73:50

Disc two
No.	Title	Writer(s)	Length
1.	"Boogie Street" (featuring Sharon Robinson; from Ten New Songs (2001))	Cohen, Robinson	6:57
2.	"Hallelujah" (from Various Positions (1984), with changes on Cohen Live (1994))		7:20
3.	"Democracy" (from The Future (1992))		7:08
4.	"I'm Your Man" (from I'm Your Man (1988))		5:41
5.	"Recitation" (with Neil Larsen)	Cohen, Neil Larsen	3:53
6.	"Take This Waltz" (from I'm Your Man (1988))	Cohen, Federico García Lorca	8:37
7.	"So Long, Marianne" (from Songs of Leonard Cohen (1967))		5:24
8.	"First We Take Manhattan" (from I'm Your Man (1988))		6:15
9.	"Sisters of Mercy" (from Songs of Leonard Cohen (1967))		4:56
10.	"If It Be Your Will" (featuring The Webb Sisters; from Various Positions (1984))		5:22
11.	"Closing Time" (from The Future (1992))		6:15
12.	"I Tried to Leave You" (from New Skin for the Old Ceremony (1974))		8:33
13.	"Whither Thou Goest"	Guy Singer	1:27
Total length:			77:48

== Personnel ==
- Leonard Cohen – vocals, acoustic guitar, keyboards
- Bob Metzger – lead guitar, pedal steel guitar, backing vocals
- Javier Mas – bandurria, laud, archilaud, 12-string acoustic guitar
- Roscoe Beck – bass, backing vocals, musical director
- Sharon Robinson – vocals
- Neil Larsen – keyboards, accordion
- Dino Soldo – saxophone, clarinet, harmonica, keyboards, backing vocals
- Rafael Bernardo Gayol – drums, percussion

The Webb Sisters:

- Charley Webb – vocals, backing vocals, guitar
- Hattie Webb – vocals, backing vocals, harp

== Charts ==
=== Weekly charts ===
Chart (2009–17)	Peak position
Australian Albums Chart	26
Austrian Albums Chart	9
Belgian (Flanders) Albums Chart	4
Belgian (Wallonia) Albums Chart	17
Canadian Albums Chart	7
Danish Albums Chart	4
Dutch Albums Chart	7
Finnish Albums Chart	7
French Albums Chart	15
German Albums Chart	13
Greek Albums Chart	3
Hungarian Albums (MAHASZ)	2
Irish Albums Chart	3
New Zealand Albums Chart	4
Norwegian Albums Chart	8
Polish Albums Chart	1
Portuguese Albums Chart	8
Spanish Albums Chart	7
Swedish Albums Chart	14
Swiss Albums Chart	23
UK Albums Chart	19
US Billboard 200	76

=== Year-end charts ===
Chart (2017)	Position
Polish Albums (ZPAV)	30

== Certifications ==
=== Album certifications ===
Region	Certification	Certified units/sales
Australia (ARIA)	Gold	35,000^{^}
Canada (Music Canada)	Platinum	80,000^{^}
Germany (BVMI)	Gold	100,000^{‡}
Hungary (MAHASZ)	Gold	3,000^{^}
Ireland (IRMA)	Gold	7,500^{^}
Netherlands (NVPI)	Gold	30,000^{^}
New Zealand (RMNZ)	Gold	7,500^{‡}
Poland (ZPAV)	Platinum	20,000^{‡}
^{^} Shipments figures based on certification alone.^{‡} Sales+streaming figures based on certification alone.

=== DVD certifications ===
Region	Certification	Certified units/sales
Australia (ARIA)	5× Platinum	75,000^{^}
Canada (Music Canada)	3× Platinum	30,000^{^}
Germany (BVMI)	Gold	25,000^{^}
Netherlands (NVPI)	Gold	30,000^{^}
New Zealand (RMNZ)	Platinum	5,000^{^}
Portugal (AFP)	Gold	4,000^{^}
^{^} Shipments figures based on certification alone.
