= Recent Songs =

Studio album by Leonard Cohen
- Released: September 27, 1979
- Recorded: April – May 1979
- Studio: A&M (Hollywood)
- Genre: Contemporary folk
- Length: 52:55
- Label: Columbia
- Producers: Leonard Cohen, Henry Lewy

Leonard Cohen chronology
Death of a Ladies' Man (1977)	Recent Songs (1979)	Various Positions (1984)

Singles from Recent Songs
- 1. "The Guests" Released: 1979

Recent Songs is the sixth studio album by Leonard Cohen, released in 1979. Produced by Cohen alongside Henry Lewy, it was a return to his normal acoustic folk music sound after the Phil Spector-driven experimentation of Death of a Ladies' Man, but now with many jazz and other influences.

== Recording and composition ==
After recording Death of a Ladies' Man with Phil Spector, a chaotically recorded album that would garner Cohen the worst reviews of his career, the singer decided to produce his next album himself with assistance from Henry Lewy, who had previously worked regularly with Joni Mitchell. The album included Gypsy violin player Raffi Hakopian, English string arranger Jeremy Lubbock, Armenian oud player (located in Los Angeles) John Bilezikjian and even a Mexican Mariachi band. Long-time Cohen collaborator Jennifer Warnes appeared prominently in vocal tracks. Members of the band Passenger, whom Cohen also met through Mitchell, played on four of the songs. Garth Hudson of the Band also appeared on the album.

Unlike the psychodrama evident on the Spector-dominated Death of a Ladies' Man, Recent Songs, which was recorded at A&M Studios in Hollywood in the spring of 1979, sounds lucid by comparison. In the book Leonard Cohen: A Remarkable Life, oud player John Bilezikjian recalls to author Anthony Reynolds: "Sessions started in the afternoon and we'd go into the evenings. No drinking, that I saw, no visitors. Finished at a reasonable time, no early hours stuff...He let me do whatever it was I wanted to do. He trusted my sense of musicality. He would be with a microphone and headphones and we'd all be wired up in our separate booths and we'd listen and add our part." The album had a largely acoustic, Eastern-tinged flavor and was augmented by the singing of Jennifer Warnes and newcomer Sharon Robinson, who would go on to become one of Cohen's favorite musical collaborators.

"Came So Far For Beauty" originated from Cohen's collaboration with New Skin for the Old Ceremony producer John Lissauer for a project called Songs For Rebecca, which was scrapped (Lissauer received co-writing credit and played the piano on the recording). In the liner notes to the album, Cohen thanks his Zen Master Roshi for inspiring one of the songs: "I owe my thanks to Joshu Sasaki upon whose exposition of an early Chinese text I based 'Ballad of the Absent Mare.'" The metaphoric lyrics are based on the twelfth-century Ten Bulls (or Ten Ox-herding Pictures). According to Anthony Reynolds 2010 Cohen memoir, "The Guests" was based on a 13th-century Persian poem and was chosen to open the album because of the enthusiastic response it had evoked when Cohen played it to friends. The album also features Cohen's interpretation of "Un Canadien errant", a song written in 1842 by Antoine Gérin-Lajoie after the Lower Canada Rebellion of 1837–38. Curiously, Cohen and Lewy opted to use a Mexican Mariachi band on the song, which is arguably the only cheerful sonic outburst on what is otherwise a languid album (the Mariachi band is also employed more subtly on "The Guests" and "The Ballad of the Absent Mare"). Cohen's 2004 song "The Faith" is based on the same folk tune as "Un Canadien errant", with Cohen's collaborator Anjani Thomas acknowledging in a 2005 interview (Old Ideas: Notes on Dear Heather) that he used an alternate 1979 track for "Un Canadien errant", adding a new vocal line with completely new lyrics, for his 2004 album Dear Heather. Cohen also recorded a studio version of the disco-infused "Do I Have to Dance All Night", which had been previously released as a live single in France in 1976, but it was not included on the album.

The musicians who recorded Recent Songs with Cohen served as his tour band later that year, highlights of which can be heard on the 2001 release Field Commander Cohen: Tour of 1979. Cohen performed several songs from the LP in concert, such as "The Guests", "The Window", and the Sinatraesque "The Smokey Life". Speaking with Mojo's Sylvie Simmons in 2001, Cohen was effusive in his praise for the album:

I think I like Recent Songs the best. The producer was Henry Levy - I was studying with Roshi at the time in Los Angeles and it was appropriate that I worked with a Los Angeles producer. Joni Mitchell introduced me to him. He had produced several of her early records. He had that great quality that Bob Johnston had: he had a lot of faith in the singer and he just let it happen. He introduced me to the group Passenger...Things had changed - these were my own songs and the musical ideas were specifically mine. I'd always wanted to combine those Middle Eastern or Eastern European sounds with the rhythmic possibilities of a jazz or rock 'n' roll rhythm section.

The painting of Cohen on the album cover is by the artist Dianne Lawrence. It is inspired by the album cover portrait taken by photographer, Hazel Field for Leonard Cohen's 2001 release, Field Commander Cohen: Tour of 1979. "The Guests" would be the opening song of Cohen's 1983 made-for-TV short musical I Am a Hotel, which would also feature "The Gypsy's Wife" as part of the narration.

== Reception ==
Professional ratings
Review scores
Source	Rating
AllMusic	4/5 stars
Christgau's Record Guide	B
Uncut	3/5 stars

Recent Songs received warm reviews and was viewed as a return to form by many critics after the shocking Death of a Ladies' Man. At the time of the album's release, The New York Times said it provided "an ideal musical idiom for his idiosyncrasies" and listed it among its top ten records of 1979. In the original 1980 Rolling Stone review, Debra Rae Cohen said: "There's not a cut on Recent Songs without something to offer...and at least four or five tunes are full-fledged masterpieces. I wish I had a tape loop of; 'The Guests' which features a hold-your-breath, haunting melody." The Tucson Citizen panned the "heavy touches of a Dylanesque vocal inflection on his more country numbers."

William Ruhlmann of AllMusic observes, "His writing had become increasingly bitter and angry during the 1970s in the books The Energy of Slaves and Death of a Lady's Man as well as in his lyrics, but there was a new equanimity in these Recent Songs that began with the welcoming introduction of 'The Guests'...The album was full of references to absence and dislocation, but Cohen deliberately countered them with humor." Cohen biographer Anthony Reynolds took a dim view of the collection in 2010: "For all its artistry, Recent Songs sounded bland and MOR...the album as a whole ploughed a self-indulgent, middling trough." The LP peaked at # 24 in Austria (where it went gold) and hit #56 in Germany.

== Cover versions ==
"Ballad of the Absent Mare" has been covered by several artists, notably Emmylou Harris on the album Cowgirl's Prayer (as "Ballad of a Runaway Horse") and Perla Batalla feat. David Hidalgo on the album Bird on the Wire: the Songs of Leonard Cohen. Martha Wainwright performs a cover version of the song "The Traitor" in the tribute film Leonard Cohen: I'm Your Man. Nana Mouskouri has covered "The Guests" on several albums (Song for Liberty, Vivre Avec Toi, I'll Remember You, The Rose) and also sung the song in translation, for instance as "Das Fest" on her German language album Ich hab gelacht, ich hab geweint. The Canadian singer Patricia O'Callaghan performs covers of "The Window", "The Gypsy's Wife" and "The Smokey Life" on her fifth solo album Matador: The Songs of Leonard Cohen released in 2012.

== Track listing ==
All songs written by Leonard Cohen, except where noted

Side one
No.	Title	Writer(s)	Length
1.	"The Guests"		6:37
2.	"Humbled In Love"		5:13
3.	"The Window"		5:54
4.	"Came So Far For Beauty"	Cohen, John Lissauer	4:01
5.	"The Lost Canadian (Un Canadien errant)"	Traditional	4:40

Side two
No.	Title	Length
6.	"The Traitor"	6:14
7.	"Our Lady Of Solitude"	3:11
8.	"The Gypsy's Wife"	5:10
9.	"The Smokey Life"	5:15
10.	"Ballad Of The Absent Mare"	6:40

== Personnel ==
- Leonard Cohen – vocals, acoustic guitar
- Mitch Watkins, Ricardo Gonzalez, Filipe Perez – guitar
- Everado Sandoval – guitarrón
- Abraham Laboriel, Roscoe Beck, John Miller – bass guitar
- John Lissauer – piano, arrangements
- Garth Hudson – Yamaha piano, accordion
- Bill Ginn – electric piano
- Randy Waldman – organ
- Steve Meador – drums
- John Bilezikjian – oud
- Raffi Hakopian, Agostin Cervantes, Armando Quintero, Luiz Briseño, Miguel Sandoval – violin
- Paul Ostermayer – saxophone
- Edgar Lustgarten – cello
- Jose Perez, Pablo Sandoval – trumpet
- Earl Dumler – oboe
- Jennifer Warnes, Jim Gilstrap, Julia Tillman Waters, Maxine Willard Waters, Roger St. Kenerly, Stephanie Spruill – backing vocals
- Jeremy Lubbock – string and horns arrangements and conductor
- Luiz Briseño – Mariachi band conductor

== Charts ==
Chart (1979–80)	Peak position
Austrian Albums (Ö3 Austria)	24
German Albums (Offizielle Top 100)	56
