= Tower of Song: A Memorial Tribute to Leonard Cohen =

2017 concert in Montreal, Canada

- Venue: Bell Centre, Montreal, Quebec, Canada
- Date: November 6, 2017

Tower of Song: A Memorial Tribute to Leonard Cohen was a concert, which was held at the Bell Centre in Montreal, Quebec on November 6, 2017, as a tribute to singer-songwriter Leonard Cohen marking the first anniversary of his death. The concert, which featured musicians performing Cohen songs, was subsequently broadcast by the Canadian Broadcasting Corporation as a radio and television special, airing on CBC Music on November 7, 2017, and on CBC Television on January 3, 2018.

Adam Cohen, who was initially the organiser of the show, said he and his team came up with about 20 songs they knew had to be performed, and then they contacted their dream list of artists. "We ended up calling hundreds of people to get to the perfect cast," Adam said. His father said once that if there were to be a public event for him after his death, it had to be in Montreal. As well, he had often said he enjoyed hearing other artists interpreting his work.

The television broadcast received several Canadian Screen Award nominations at the 7th Canadian Screen Awards in 2019, including Best Variety or Entertainment Special, Best Direction in a Variety or Sketch Comedy Program (Jack Bender) and Best Writing in a Variety or Sketch Comedy Program (Carrie Mudd).

== Leonard Cohen: If It Be Your Will ==
In 2024, directors Adrian Wills and Sylvain Lebel released the documentary film Leonard Cohen: If It Be Your Will, which blended performances from the 2017 concert with archival footage of Cohen's own personal reflections on his life and career. The film received a Canadian Screen Award nomination for Best Biography or Arts Documentary Program or Series at the 13th Canadian Screen Awards in 2025.

== Performers ==
1. Sting, "Dance Me to the End of Love"
2. Feist, "Hey, That's No Way to Say Goodbye"
3. Patrick Watson, "Who by Fire"
4. Sharon Robinson, "I'm Your Man""
5. Wesley Schultz and Jeremiah Fraites, "Democracy"
6. Leonard Cohen (archival footage), "A Thousand Kisses Deep"
7. Ron Sexsmith, "Suzanne"
8. Elvis Costello, "The Future"
9. Damien Rice, "Famous Blue Raincoat"
10. Adam Cohen and The Webb Sisters, "So Long, Marianne"
11. k.d. lang, "Hallelujah"

Intermission

1. Shaar Hashomayim Choir with pre-recorded videos of: Willie Nelson, Céline Dion, Peter Gabriel and Chris Martin and archival footage of Leonard Cohen, "Tower of Song"
2. Sting, "Sisters of Mercy"
3. Lana Del Rey and Adam Cohen, "Chelsea Hotel #2"
4. Bettye LaVette, "In My Secret Life"
5. Courtney Love, "Everybody Knows"
6. Seth Rogen, "Field Commander Cohen (poem)"
7. Børns and The Webb Sisters, "If It Be Your Will
8. Cœur de pirate, Adam Cohen and Damien Rice, "The Partisan"
9. Elvis Costello, "Bird on the Wire"

Encore

1. Sting, "Anthem"
2. Shaar Hashomayim Choir with pre-recorded vocals of Leonard Cohen, "You Want It Darker"

Encore 2

1. Adam Cohen and Basia Bulat, "Coming Back to You"
2. Basia Bulat, "Closing Time"
