= Matador: The Songs of Leonard Cohen =

Studio album by Patricia O'Callaghan
- Released: 31 January 2012
- Recorded: The Canterbury Music Company, Toronto, Ontario, Canada
- Genre: Pop
- Length: 57:56
- Label: Marquis Classics
- Producer: Patricia O'Callaghan, Jeremy Darby

Patricia O'Callaghan chronology
Broken Hearts & Madmen (2011)	Matador: The Songs of Leonard Cohen (2012)	Bohemians in Brooklyn (2013)

Professional ratings
Review scores
Source	Rating
AllMusic	3.5/5 stars

Matador: The Songs of Leonard Cohen is the fifth solo album recorded by the Canadian singer Patricia O'Callaghan and was released by the Marquis Classics label in January 2012.

Matador won almost immediate critical acclaim. Christopher Loudon described it in a review for JazzTimes magazine as a "superb collection of Leonard Cohen gems" recorded by "arguably Canada's most gifted jazz-cabaret hybrid" on an album featuring "what is quite possibly the most exquisite 'Hallelujah' ever recorded". Jon O’Brien wrote in a review for the AllMusic website: "A graceful and respectful homage to a true musical icon, Matador: The Songs of Leonard Cohen cements O’Callaghan’s position as one of his most accomplished interpreters."

Named after the Toronto tavern that Cohen frequented in the 1960s, Matador is unusual for a pop music album since, although electric guitar can be heard on one song ("Everybody Knows"), none of the tracks features electric bass guitar. The violinist, cellist and pianist on the album, Patipatanakoon, Borys and Parker, are better-known as the Canadian chamber music ensemble the Gryphon Trio. One song ("The Smokey Life") is a duet with Steven Page, a founder member of Barenaked Ladies. Matador was produced with financial assistance from the Government of Canada through the Department of Canadian Heritage's Canada Music Fund.

Among many other venues, O'Callaghan performed songs from this album at MusicFest Vancouver, at Global Cabaret Festival and at the Aylmer Performing Arts concert series.

== Track listing ==
All songs written by Leonard Cohen except where noted.

1. "The Gypsy's Wife" (4:16)
2. "The Window" (5:24)
3. "Dance Me to the End of Love" (4:13)
4. "Who by Fire" (3:12)
5. "Alexandra Leaving" (5:00) (Cohen, Sharon Robinson)
6. "Everybody Knows" (3:59) (Cohen, Robinson)
7. "Suzanne" (4:25)
8. "If It Be Your Will" (3:38)
9. "Anthem" (4:27)
10. "The Smokey Life" (6:11)
11. "Joan of Arc" (5:51)
12. "I'm Your Man" (3:09)
13. "Hallelujah" (3:58)

== Personnel ==
=== Musicians ===
- Patricia O'Callaghan – vocals
- John Gzowski – guitars, ukulele
- David Restivo – piano, organ
- Andrew Downing – bass
- Mark Mariash – drums, percussion
- Annalee Patipatanakoon – violin
- Roman Borys – cello
- Jamie Parker – piano
- Max Christie – clarinet
- Ernie Tollar – sax and flutes
- Mike Ross – guest singer
- Sienna Dahlen – guest singer
- Maryem Tollar – guest singer
- Steven Page – guest singer

=== Recording personnel ===
- Patricia O'Callaghan – co-producer
- Jeremy Darby – co-producer/engineer
- Andrew Downing – associate producer/arranger
- Andrew Heppner – assistant engineer
- Sam Ibbett – assistant engineer
- Jeff Wolpert – mixing and mastering
