= Dear Heather =

Studio album by Leonard Cohen
- Released: October 26, 2004
- Recorded: 1979, July 9, 1985, 2002–04
- Genre: Soft rock, contemporary folk
- Length: 49:27
- Label: Columbia
- Producer: Leanne Ungar, Sharon Robinson, Anjani Thomas, Henry Lewy

Leonard Cohen chronology
The Essential Leonard Cohen (2002)	Dear Heather (2004)	Live in London (2009)

Dear Heather is the eleventh studio album by Canadian singer-songwriter Leonard Cohen, released by Columbia Records in 2004. It was dedicated "in memory of Jack McClelland 1922-2004."

== Background ==
The album features Cohen experimenting with different musical approaches. On "To a Teacher", Cohen quotes himself from The Spice-Box of Earth, his second collection of poetry from 1961. The basic tracks of "The Faith" dated back to the Recent Songs sessions from 1979. The album includes a live version of the country standard "Tennessee Waltz", which was taken from a performance during his tour in support of the LP Various Positions. Considering the plethora of sources from which the material sprang, Cohen had originally wanted to call the album Old Ideas, but eventually changed it to Dear Heather for fear that fans might assume it was merely a compilation or "best of" package (Old Ideas would be the title of Cohen's next studio album). There is increase in spoken poetry over singing, with two songs featuring words by other writers: Lord Byron ("No More a-Roving") and F. R. Scott ("Villanelle for our Time"). The gospel-tinged "On That Day" addresses the still-raw tragedy and horror of the 9/11 terrorist attacks.

== Reception ==
Professional ratings
Aggregate scores
Source	Rating
Metacritic	74/100
Review scores
Source	Rating
AllMusic	3.5/5 stars
Blender	4/5 stars
Entertainment Weekly	B−
The Guardian	3/5 stars
Mojo	4/5 stars
NME	7/10
Pitchfork	8.0/10
Rolling Stone	3.5/5 stars
Uncut	5/5 stars
The Village Voice	B

The album reached No. 131 on the Billboard 200 and Internet Album charts and #5 on the Canadian Album charts. It was Cohen's highest charting album in America since 1969's Songs from a Room. The album's highest chart position came in Poland where it reached #1 on the Polish Albums Chart. Dear Heather was not received as well by critics as Ten New Songs and Cohen's 2001 live album Field Commander Cohen: Tour of 1979 had been. Some critics found it dour - although such notices had been commonplace throughout various stages of Cohen's career - and noted a tone of finality in the offering. The New York Times reported, "Some of the songs are virtually unadorned with poetic imagery and fall flat; in others, Mr. Cohen uses his calmly sepulchral voice for speech rather than melody. The production is homemade." Stylus Magazine deemed it an "unsatisfying way to end such an intriguing career." In the November 2004 Rolling Stone review of the LP, Michaelangelo Matos praised the album, calling Cohen "Canada's hippest 70 year old" and insisting that "given how monochromatic Cohen tends to be, the jumbled feel works in Dear Heather's favor." Thom Jurek of AllMusic argues that Dear Heather is Cohen's "most upbeat" album: "Rather than focus on loss as an end, it looks upon experience as something to be accepted as a portal to wisdom and gratitude...If this is indeed his final offering as a songwriter, it is a fine, decent, and moving way to close this chapter of the book of his life."

== Track listing ==
All tracks are written by Leonard Cohen, except where noted.

No.	Title	Lyrics	Music	Producer(s)	Length
1.	"Go No More a-Roving"	Lord Byron		Sharon Robinson	3:40
2.	"Because Of"			Leanne Ungar	3:00
3.	"The Letters"		Cohen, Robinson	Robinson	4:44
4.	"Undertow"			Ungar	4:20
5.	"Morning Glory"			Ungar	4:20
6.	"On That Day"		Cohen, Anjani Thomas	Thomas	2:04
7.	"Villanelle for Our Time"	F. R. Scott		Ungar	5:55
8.	"There for You"		Cohen, Robinson	Robinson	4:36
9.	"Dear Heather"			Ungar	3:41
10.	"Nightingale"		Cohen, Thomas	Thomas, Ed Sanders	2:27
11.	"To a Teacher"			Ungar	2:32
12.	"The Faith"		based on "Un Canadien errant"	Ungar, Henry Lewy	4:17
13.	"Tennessee Waltz" (Live at Montreux Jazz Festival)	Redd Stewart; additional verse: Cohen	Pee Wee King	Cohen	4:05
Total length:					49:27

== Personnel ==
- Leonard Cohen – vocals, guitar, Jew's harp on "On That Day" and "Nightingale"
- Sharon Robinson – vocals, arrangements
- Anjani Thomas – vocals, backing vocals; piano on "On That Day", "Nightingale" and "Tennessee Waltz"
- Bob Sheppard – tenor saxophone on "Go No More a-Roving"
- Stan Sargeant – bass on "On That Day" and "Nightingale"
- Johnny Friday – drums on "On That Day" and "Nightingale"
- Sarah Kramer – trumpet on "Dear Heather"
- Mitch Watkins – guitar on "The Faith" and "Tennessee Waltz"
- Garth Hudson – accordion on "The Faith"
- Roscoe Beck – bass on "The Faith"
- Bill Ginn – piano on "The Faith"
- Raffi Hakopian – violin on "The Faith"
- John Bilezikjian – oud on "The Faith"
- Paul Ostermayer – flute on "The Faith"
- Ron Getman – steel guitar and vocals on "Tennessee Waltz"
- John Crowder – bass and vocals on "Tennessee Waltz"
- Richard Crooks – drums on "Tennessee Waltz"
- Jeremy Lubbock – string arrangement on "The Faith"

== Track notes ==
- "Go No More a-Roving" is musical adaptation of Lord Byron's poem "So, we'll go no more a roving", dedicated to Cohen's friend and mentor, Canadian poet Irving Layton, member of the Montreal Group of modernist poets.
- "Villanelle for Our Time" was recorded 6 May 1999, shortly after Cohen's return from Mount Baldy Zen Center. It is an improvised jazz recitation of a poem by F. R. Scott, Cohen's older colleague from the Montreal Group of modernist poets.
- "To a Teacher" is a spoken-word track based on Cohen's poem from his 1961 book of poetry The Spice-Box of Earth, dedicated to the Canadian poet A.M. Klein.
- "The Letters" is a duet with Cohen's producer, collaborator and track's co-writer Sharon Robinson.
- "Because Of" is a recitation of Cohen's poem which was included in his 2006 Book of Longing.
- "On That Day" is a song about the September 11, 2001 attacks in New York City.
- The track "Nightingale" is dedicated to the late R&B singer Carl Anderson, Anjani Thomas's colleague. She composed the music using Cohen's abandoned poem.
- Music track for "The Faith" is actually an outtake from Recent Songs, with completely new lyrics, re-mixed and with new vocals added (thus the production was co-credited to Recent Songs producer Henry Lewy). It was based on a Québec folk song.
- The final track is a live performance of "Tennessee Waltz", recorded 9 July 1985 at the Montreux Jazz Festival. It was taken from the bootlegged radio recording and cleaned up digitally.

== Charts ==
=== Weekly charts ===
Chart (2004)	Peak position
Australian Albums (ARIA)	98
Austrian Albums (Ö3 Austria)	13
Belgian Albums (Ultratop Flanders)	9
Belgian Albums (Ultratop Wallonia)	26
Canadian Albums (Billboard)	5
Danish Albums (Hitlisten)	1
Dutch Albums (Album Top 100)	34
Finnish Albums (Suomen virallinen lista)	22
French Albums (SNEP)	34
German Albums (Offizielle Top 100)	19
Italian Albums (FIMI)	27
Norwegian Albums (VG-lista)	2
Portuguese Albums (AFP)	5
Swedish Albums (Sverigetopplistan)	8
Swiss Albums (Schweizer Hitparade)	13
UK Albums (OCC)	34
US Billboard 200	131

=== Year-end charts ===
Chart (2004)	Position
Belgian Albums (Ultratop Flanders)	81

== Certifications ==
Region	Certification	Certified units/sales
Denmark (IFPI Danmark)	Gold	20,000^{^}
Norway (IFPI Norway)	Gold	20,000^{*}
Poland (ZPAV)	Gold	20,000^{*}
United Kingdom (BPI)	Silver	60,000^{^}
^{*} Sales figures based on certification alone.^{^} Shipments figures based on certification alone.
