= Cohen Live =

Live album by Leonard Cohen
- Released: June 28, 1994
- Recorded: 1988, 1993
- Genres: Contemporary folk, soft rock
- Length: 71:50
- Label: Sony
- Producers: Leanne Ungar, Bob Metzger

Leonard Cohen chronology
The Future (1992)	Cohen Live (1994)	More Best of Leonard Cohen (1997)

Professional ratings
Review scores
Source	Rating
Robert Christgau	(neither)
Uncut	3/5 stars

Cohen Live is a live album by Leonard Cohen released in 1994.

The songs were recorded live in 1988 on the I'm Your Man Tour and in 1993 on The Future World Tour. Several of the songs have altered lyrics, which are printed in the liner notes as sung. This was Cohen's first live release since Live Songs in 1973. Reviews were mixed, with Time writing, "This glum, melancholy collection should be dispensed only with large doses of Prozac."

== Track listing ==
All songs written by Leonard Cohen, except where noted

No.	Title	Writer(s)	Place and date	Length
1.	"Dance Me to the End of Love"		Toronto, June 17, 1993	6:10
2.	"Bird on the Wire"		Toronto, June 17, 1993	6:53
3.	"Everybody Knows"	Cohen, Sharon Robinson	Vancouver, July 29, 1993	6:08
4.	"Joan of Arc"		Toronto, June 17, 1993	6:13
5.	"There Is A War"		Toronto, June 17, 1993	4:46
6.	"Sisters Of Mercy"		Toronto, June 17, 1993	6:15
7.	"Hallelujah"		Austin, October 31, 1988	6:54
8.	"I'm Your Man"		Toronto, June 17, 1993	5:29
9.	"Who By Fire"		Austin, October 31, 1988	5:09
10.	"One Of Us Cannot Be Wrong"		San Sebastian, May 20, 1988	5:20
11.	"If It Be Your Will"		Austin, October 31, 1988	3:18
12.	"Heart With No Companion"		Amsterdam, April 19, 1988	4:50
13.	"Suzanne"		Vancouver, July 29, 1993	4:18

== Personnel ==
- Leonard Cohen – guitar, keyboard, vocals
- Perla Batalla – vocals
- Julie Christensen – vocals
- Bob Furgo – keyboards, violin
- Bob Metzger – guitars, pedal steel
- Steve Meador – drums

Additional musicians (1988)

- John Bilezikjian – oud, mandolin
- Tom McMorran – keyboards
- Stephen Zirkel – bass, trumpet, keyboards
- Roscoe Beck – musical director

Additional musicians (1993)

- Jorge Calderón – bass, vocals
- Bill Ginn – keyboards
- Paul Ostermayer – saxes, keyboards
