= The Gypsy's Wife =

Song by Leonard Cohen

from the album Recent Songs
- Released: 27 September 1979
- Genre: Pop
- Length: 5:13
- Label: Columbia Records
- Songwriter: Leonard Cohen

"The Gypsy's Wife" is a song written by the Canadian singer-songwriter Leonard Cohen that was first released on his sixth studio album Recent Songs (1979). Live recordings of it appear as the fourth track on Field Commander Cohen: Tour of 1979 (2001), the thirteenth track on Cohen's Live in London (2009) and as the sixth track on Live in Dublin (2013). It continued to feature regularly in his stage performances until his death.

== Theme and lyrics ==
The theme of the song is that of sexual infidelity and it is built around the refrain "And where, where is my gypsy wife tonight?" It implicitly references the folk-song, which exists in many versions (e.g. "The Gypsy Rover", "The Black Jack Davy", "The Raggle-Taggle Gypsy"), of the well-born bride who runs away with the gypsies. In Cohen's version, it is the gypsy himself who comes home looking for his wife and finds her gone.

The song then moves in a more biblical direction, referencing Judith and Holofernes (coloured by details from the stories of Salome and Ruth) in the line "Whose head is this she's dancing with on the threshing-floor?", and later Genesis 7–8, the story of Noah and the Flood.

In her 2012 work, Cohen biographer Sylvie Simmons writes of the song: "Its sensual melody is paired with dark accusatory lyrics that are biblical in tone." She called the stern sense of loss Cohen voiced, in the song, "a touch disproportionate", given his long history of finding lovers who were already in relationships with other men.

== Composition ==
Cohen explained that he wrote the song partly about the break-up of his own long-term relationship with the Los Angeles graphic artist Suzanne Elrod in 1978. In an interview for the 1979 Harry Rasky documentary film The Song of Leonard Cohen, he said:

"The Gypsy’s Wife" was one of the last and swiftest songs I’ve written. I started it in Los Angeles around the time I began recording [Recent Songs], which was last March or April [1978], and the song was ready in about three months. And, of course, my own marriage was breaking up at the time and, in a sense, it was written for my gypsy wife, in other words the wife that was wandering away. But in another way it's just a song about the way men and women have lost one another, that men and women have wandered away from each other and have become gypsies to each other. The last verse says There is no man or woman you can't touch. But you who come between them, you will be judged. In other words, even though we are in the midst of some kind of psychic catastrophe it's not an invitation to take advantage of it, and that's mostly what the song is about.

Although Cohen referred in this interview to his "marriage" to Suzanne Elrod he later pointed out that "cowardice" and "fear" had prevented him from actually marrying her. Elrod is the mother of both of Cohen's children: his son Adam Cohen (born 1972) and daughter Lorca (born 1974).

Cohen first performed "The Gypsy's Wife" live on stage in Paris on 10 October 1979. When he performed it live in Tel Aviv, Israel, on 24 November 1980, he introduced it with the words: "This is a little song that I wrote for my wife after she ran away."

== Cover versions and translations ==
The Canadian singer Patricia O'Callaghan has recorded two different cover versions of the song: the first with the Gryphon Trio on the album Broken Hearts & Madmen (2011) and the second on her solo album Matador: The Songs of Leonard Cohen (2012).

The Spanish flamenco cantaor (singer) Juan Rafael Cortés Santiago, who performs as Duquende, has recorded a Spanish translation, "Mi Gitana" ("My Gypsy Wife"), of the song (2007).
