= The God Abandons Antony =

1911 poem by Constantine P. Cavafy

"The God Abandons Antony" (Greek: Ἀπολείπειν ὁ θεὸς Ἀντώνιον; also translated as "The God Forsakes Antony") is a poem by Constantine P. Cavafy, published in 1911.

== Story ==
The God Abandons Antony refers to Plutarch's story of how Antony, besieged in Alexandria by Octavian, heard the sounds of instruments and voices of a procession making its way through the city, then passing out; the god Dionysus (Bacchus), Antony's protector, was deserting him; the poem's title itself is a verbatim quotation from Plutarch's text.

=== Excerpt ===
Original Greek	Transliteration	English Translation
Ένα όνειρο, πως απατήθηκε η ακοή σου, μάταιες ελπίδες τέτοιες μην καταδεχθείς. Σαν έτοιμος από καιρό, σα θαρραλέος, σαν που ταιριάζει σε που αξιώθηκες μια τέτοια πόλι, πλησίασε σταθερά προς το παράθυρο, κι άκουσε με συγκίνησιν, αλλ´όχι με των δειλών τα παρακάλια και παράπονα, ως τελευταία απόλαυση τους ήχους, τα εξαίσια όργανα του μυστικού θιάσου, κι αποχαιρέτα την, την Αλεξάνδρεια που χάνεις.	Éna óneiro, pos apatíthike I akoí sou, mátaies eplídes tétoies min katadechtheís. San étoimos apó kairó, sa tharraléos, san pou tairiázei se pou axióthikes pros to paráthyro, ki ákouse me synkínisin, all’óchi me ton deilón ta parakália Kai parápona, so teleftaía apólafsi tous íchous, ta exaísia órgana tou mystikoú thiásou, ki apochairéta tin, tin Alexándreia pou cháneis.	At midnight, when suddenly you hear an invisible procession going by with exquisite music, voices, don't mourn your luck that's failing now, work gone wrong, your plans all proving deceptive — don't mourn them uselessly: as one long prepared, and full of courage, say goodbye to her, to Alexandria who is leaving. Above all, don't fool yourself, don't say it was a dream, your ears deceived you: don't degrade yourself with empty hopes like these. As one long prepared, and full of courage, as is right for you who were given this kind of city, go firmly to the window and listen with deep emotion, but not with the whining, the pleas of a coward; listen — your final pleasure — to the voices, to the exquisite music of that strange procession, and say goodbye to her, to the Alexandria you are losing.

== Adaptations ==
Leonard Cohen and Sharon Robinson freely adapted this poem for their song "Alexandra Leaving" (Ten New Songs, 2001). Whereas Cavafy's theme was based around the city of Alexandria, Cohen's version builds around a woman named Alexandra.
