= More Best of Leonard Cohen =

Greatest hits album by Leonard Cohen
- Released: October 7, 1997
- Genres: Folk rock, contemporary folk
- Length: 71:08
- Label: Columbia

Leonard Cohen chronology
Cohen Live (1994)	More Best of Leonard Cohen (1997)	Field Commander Cohen: Tour of 1979 (2001)

Professional ratings
Review scores
Source	Rating
Uncut	5/5 stars
NME	7/10 stars

More Best of Leonard Cohen is a collection of Leonard Cohen songs released in 1997.

== Background ==
It is a sequel to the 1975 album The Best of Leonard Cohen and was released during a period of inactivity for the singer, who had retreated to the Mt. Baldy Zen Center near Los Angeles in 1994. Tracks are drawn from albums I'm Your Man (1988) and The Future (1992), as well as the live album Cohen Live (1994). The collection features two unique tracks: "Never Any Good" (recorded 1995 in Los Angeles) and "The Great Event". During an interview with Paul Zollo that appears in the book Songwriters on Songwriting, Cohen speaks about composing "Never Any Good" and a verse not included in the final recording:

I was just working on a line this morning for a song called "I Was Never Any Good at Loving You." And the line was - I don’t think I’ve nailed it yet - "I was running from the law, I thought you knew, forgiveness was the way it felt with you" or "forgiven was the way I felt with you." Then I got a metaphysical line, about the old law and the new law, the Old Testament and the New Testament: "I was running from the law, the old and the new, forgiven was the way I felt with you." No, I thought, it’s too intellectual. Then I thought I got it: "I was running from the cops and the robbers too, forgiven was the way I felt with you." You got cops and robbers, it dignifies the line by making it available, making it commonplace.

== Track listing ==
All songs written by Leonard Cohen except as noted

No.	Title	Writer(s)	Length
1.	"Everybody Knows"	Cohen, Sharon Robinson	5:32
2.	"I'm Your Man"		4:24
3.	"Take This Waltz"	Cohen, Frederico Garcia Lorca	5:58
4.	"Tower Of Song"		5:37
5.	"Anthem"		6:06
6.	"Democracy"		7:12
7.	"The Future"		6:40
8.	"Closing Time"		5:58
9.	"Dance Me to the End of Love" (Live)		6:12
10.	"Suzanne" (Live)		4:19
11.	"Hallelujah" (Live)		6:55
12.	"Never Any Good"		5:04
13.	"The Great Event"		1:09

== Charts ==
=== Weekly charts ===
Chart (1997–98)	Peak position
Austrian Albums (Ö3 Austria)	41
Belgian Albums (Ultratop Flanders)	19
Belgian Albums (Ultratop Wallonia)	24
Danish Albums (Hitlisten)	5
Dutch Albums (Album Top 100)	69
Finnish Albums (Suomen virallinen lista)	19
Norwegian Albums (VG-lista)	7
Swedish Albums (Sverigetopplistan)	22

Chart (2016)	Peak position
French Albums (SNEP)	153
Italian Albums (FIMI)	78
Polish Albums (ZPAV)	4

=== Year-end charts ===
Chart (2002)	Position
Canadian Alternative Albums (Nielsen SoundScan)	135

Chart (2016)	Position
Polish Albums (ZPAV)	75

== Certifications ==
Region	Certification	Certified units/sales
Australia (ARIA)	Gold	35,000^{^}
Denmark (IFPI Danmark)	Platinum	20,000^{‡}
Poland (ZPAV)	Platinum	70,000^{*}
^{*} Sales figures based on certification alone.^{^} Shipments figures based on certification alone.^{‡} Sales+streaming figures based on certification alone.
