= Can't Forget: A Souvenir of the Grand Tour =

Live album by Leonard Cohen
- Released: May 12, 2015
- Recorded: August 25, 2012 – December 21, 2013
- Genre: Folk rock
- Length: 48:35
- Label: Columbia

Leonard Cohen chronology
Live in Dublin (2014)	Can't Forget: A Souvenir of the Grand Tour (2015)	You Want It Darker (2016)

Professional ratings
Review scores
Source	Rating
AllMusic	3.5/5 stars
The Guardian	3/5 stars
Rolling Stone	4/5 stars

Can't Forget: A Souvenir of the Grand Tour is a live album by Canadian singer-songwriter Leonard Cohen, released in May 2015. It contains live recordings from concerts and sound-checks.

== Track listing ==
All songs written by Leonard Cohen, except where noted.

No.	Title	Writer(s)	Recorded	Length
1.	"Field Commander Cohen" (from New Skin for the Old Ceremony)		November 3, 2012, 1stBank Center, Denver, Colorado, United States sound check	4:24
2.	"I Can't Forget" (from I'm Your Man)		August 25, 2012, Rosenborg Castle, Copenhagen, Denmark	4:17
3.	"Light as the Breeze" (from The Future)		September 11, 2012, Irish Museum of Modern Art, Dublin, Ireland	6:33
4.	"La Manic" (in French)	Georges Dor	December 2, 2012, Colisée Pepsi, Quebec City, Quebec, Canada	4:14
5.	"Night Comes On" (from Various Positions)		6 September 2012, Warsteiner HockeyPark, Mönchengladbach, Germany	5:55
6.	"Never Gave Nobody Trouble" (New composition)		August 17, 2013, The King's Garden, Odense, Denmark sound check	4:51
7.	"Joan of Arc" (from Songs of Love and Hate)		December 2, 2012, Colisée Pepsi, Quebec City, Quebec, Canada sound check	6:30
8.	"Got a Little Secret" (New composition)		December 21, 2013, Vector Arena, Auckland, New Zealand sound check	4:35
9.	"Choices"	Mike Curtis, Billy Yates	December 14, 2013, CBS Canterbury Arena, Christchurch, New Zealand sound check	3:31
10.	"Stages"		December 2, 2013, Sydney Opera House, Sydney, Australia	3:42

== Charts ==
=== Weekly charts ===
Chart (2015)	Peak position
Australian Albums (ARIA)	39
Austrian Albums (Ö3 Austria)	17
Belgian Albums (Ultratop Flanders)	14
Belgian Albums (Ultratop Wallonia)	44
Canadian Albums (Billboard)	8
Danish Albums (Hitlisten)	28
Dutch Albums (Album Top 100)	4
French Albums (SNEP)	110
German Albums (Offizielle Top 100)	23
Irish Albums (IRMA)	5
Italian Albums (FIMI)	29
New Zealand Albums (Recorded Music NZ)	29
Portuguese Albums (AFP)	24
Scottish Albums (OCC)	16
Spanish Albums (Promusicae)	26
Swedish Albums (Sverigetopplistan)	39
Swiss Albums (Schweizer Hitparade)	18
UK Albums (OCC)	18
US Billboard 200	100
US Top Rock Albums (Billboard)	12

=== Year-end charts ===
Chart (2015)	Position
Belgian Albums (Ultratop Flanders)	182
