= Ten New Songs =

Studio album by Leonard Cohen
- Released: October 9, 2001
- Recorded: late 1999 – mid 2001 mixed at Still Life Studios, Los Angeles; Small Mercies studio, Hollywood
- Genres: Contemporary folk, soft rock
- Length: 52:41
- Label: Columbia
- Producer: Sharon Robinson

Leonard Cohen chronology
Field Commander Cohen: Tour of 1979 (2001)	Ten New Songs (2001)	The Essential Leonard Cohen (2002)

Singles from Ten New Songs
- 1. "In My Secret Life" Released: 2001; 2. "Boogie Street" Released: 2002

Ten New Songs is Leonard Cohen's tenth studio album, released in 2001. His first album in 9 years, Ten New Songs was co-written and produced by Sharon Robinson in Cohen's and Robinson's home studios in Los Angeles. The album peaked at No. 143 on the Billboard 200, No. 4 in Canada (where it went platinum), No. 1 in Poland (where it went platinum) and No. 1 in Norway.

== Background ==
After successfully touring behind the award-winning album The Future, Cohen was awarded a Governor General's Performance Arts Award for his contribution to Canadian music in 1993 and was the subject of an hour-long CBC Radio retrospective called The Gospel According to Leonard Cohen. Cohen also published a collection of poems and songs called Stranger Music and released his second live album Cohen Live in 1994.

That same year, Cohen unexpectedly retreated to the Mt. Baldy Zen Center near Los Angeles to spend time with his Zen Master Joshu Sasaki, or Roshi, a sabbatical that would last five years. In 2001 the singer explained to Mojo's Sylvie Simmons, "Well, I was always going off the deep end, so it was no radical departure. When I finished my tour in '93 I was approaching the age of 60 and my old friend and teacher Roshi was approaching the age of 90, and I thought it would be the right moment to spend some more time with him...I wasn't looking for a new religion or another list of dogma."

Cohen has stated in numerous interviews that throughout the success of the I'm Your Man and The Future tours, he remained desperately unhappy; in the book Leonard Cohen: A Remarkable Life, biographer Anthony Reynolds quotes the singer: "I'd been drinking three bottles of wine a night on the tour and one of the things I was looking for was a rest...I didn't know what else to do."

Interest in Cohen only grew, however, with a tribute album called Tower of Song being released in 1995. According to Ira Nadel's 1996 Cohen memoir Various Positions: A Life of Leonard Cohen, Cohen flirted with the idea of recording an album of 14 short songs during this period, but eventually scrapped the project. (One song, "Never Any Good," would turn up on the 1997 release More Best of Leonard Cohen.) In June 1999, Cohen returned to his L.A. duplex to live with his daughter and began collaborating with Sharon Robinson (co-writer of "Everybody Knows" and "Waiting for the Miracle") on what would become Ten New Songs.

== Recording and composition ==
Robinson produced, co-arranged, co-wrote and sang on Ten New Songs, making it a true collaboration. Cohen gave Robinson some lyrics he had written and she built the music around them. Cohen was so impressed with Robinson's demos that she ended up singing all the songs with him, including several leads. "At his insistence", Robinson clarified to Mojo's Sylvie Simmons. "It's ironic, isn't it, that the man who's got this voice that women swoon over just wants to hide it away?" The album was recorded by Robinson and Cohen in near isolation, with Leanne Ungar engineering and Bob Metzger adding guitar to the LP's first single, "In My Secret Life". In 2010, Robinson spoke about the recording with Cohen biographer Anthony Reynolds:

The way the album came about is linked to the actual sound of it. The album had a unique path and it wasn't done in the way an album is normally done. It was also recorded pretty much in the order it plays in...The recording was some kind of extension of his time at Mount Baldy. He was still very reclusive during this time...I would initially sing and play everything, at the time not knowing if we were bringing in other musicians or singers. Of course as it turned out, we didn't so my voice stayed because Leonard liked what he was hearing.

Robinson also divulged to Reynolds that most of the album was recorded in her three-car garage that was adjoined to her house (which she had converted to a studio) and that she would take the raw audio on a portable hard drive to Cohen's converted studio above his garage.

The album was Cohen's first to be recorded completely digitally. "There's a sense of relaxation in the tunes that comes through", Cohen told Nick Patton Walsh of The Observer in 2001. "There's a kind of pulse, an invitation to get into it - a groove."

Several of the tracks on Ten New Songs existed in some form or another long before they appeared on the album; Cohen first revealed he was working on a new song called "My Secret Life" in 1988, and, in 1995, Melinda Newman of Billboard reported that two tracks, "My Secret Life" and "A Thousand Kisses Deep", were "close to completion... I’d like to have a very intimate kind of record, of a very different nature than actual songs."

"In My Secret Life", a song that wound up being an ode to unrequited love, became the album's first single with an accompanying music video that was filmed in Montreal at Habitat 67. Other songs, such as "Alexandra Leaving" (based on "The God Abandons Antony", also translated as "The God Forsakes Antony", a poem by Constantine P. Cavafy, published in 1911) and "You Have Loved Enough", imply departures of some sort or another.

Ten New Songs was remastered and reissued on vinyl by the Netherlands label Music On Vinyl in 2009.

== Reception ==
Professional ratings
Aggregate scores
Source	Rating
Metacritic	76/100
Review scores
Source	Rating
AllMusic	3.5/5 stars
Blender	4/5 stars
Entertainment Weekly	A−
The Guardian	4/5 stars
NME	7/10
Pitchfork	8.0/10
Q	3/5 stars
The Rolling Stone Album Guide	4/5 stars
Uncut	5/5 stars
The Village Voice	A−

In the October 2001 Rolling Stone review of the album, Steven Chean stated, "Ten New Songs manages to sustain loss's fragile beauty like never before and might just be the Cohen's most exquisite ode yet to the midnight hour." Uncut deemed it "worth the wait." Playboy opined: "Although the tones of these odes and meditations is mournful, at the age of 67 Cohen's pessimism about the human condition is tempered with reconciliation. He'll never be cheerful, but a Zen-like serenity pervades every song."

== Cover recordings ==
Eric Burdon, Katie Melua, Till Brönner and Edo Zanki have recorded cover versions of "In My Secret Life". Luciana Souza recorded a version of "Here It Is" on her album The New Bossa Nova. Jonathan Richman recorded a version of "Here It Is" for his 2008 album Because Her Beauty Is Raw & Wild.

"A Thousand Kisses Deep" was used in the movie The Good Thief, the 2010 French movie Le bruit des glaçons, and in Season 3 of the TV Series Veronica Mars. It was also covered by Chris Botti in his album of the same name in 2003, and by Till Brönner and Dieter Ilg on their album Nightfall in 2018.

"That Don't Make It Junk" was covered live by Widespread Panic three times in 2011. "Alexandra Leaving" was covered by Canadian singer Patricia O'Callaghan on her fifth solo album, Matador: The Songs of Leonard Cohen, in late 2011. It has also been covered by Anne Hills and Allan Olsen. "The Land of Plenty" was used in the 2004 movie Land of Plenty directed by Wim Wenders. German punk singer Nina Hagen covered "By the Rivers Dark" with German lyrics by Ton Steine Scherben-member Misha B. Schoeneberg as "Am dunklen Fluss" for the 2014 cover collection Poem - Leonard Cohen in deutscher Sprache. Molly Johnson covered "Boogie Street" on her 2018 album Meaning to Tell Ya.

== Track listing ==
All tracks are written by Leonard Cohen and Sharon Robinson.

No.	Title	Length
1.	"In My Secret Life"	4:55
2.	"A Thousand Kisses Deep"	6:29
3.	"That Don't Make It Junk"	4:28
4.	"Here It Is"	4:18
5.	"Love Itself"	5:26
6.	"By the Rivers Dark"	5:20
7.	"Alexandra Leaving" (based on "The God Abandons Antony", a poem by Constantine P. Cavafy)	5:25
8.	"You Have Loved Enough"	5:41
9.	"Boogie Street"	6:04
10.	"The Land of Plenty"	4:35
Total length:		52:41

== Personnel ==
- Leonard Cohen – vocals, cover photography
- Sharon Robinson – vocals, keyboards, synthesizers, programming, arrangements
- Bob Metzger – guitar on "In My Secret Life"
- David Campbell – string arrangement on "A Thousand Kisses Deep"
- Leanne Ungar – engineer
- Nancy Donald – art direction

== Charts ==
=== Weekly charts ===
Weekly chart performance for Ten New Songs
Chart (2001–2010)	Peak position
Australian Albums (ARIA)	67
Austrian Albums (Ö3 Austria)	5
Belgian Albums (Ultratop Flanders)	6
Belgian Albums (Ultratop Wallonia)	3
Canadian Albums (Billboard)	4
Danish Albums (Hitlisten)	1
Dutch Albums (Album Top 100)	18
European Albums (Eurotipsheet)	3
Finnish Albums (Suomen virallinen lista)	35
French Albums (SNEP)	3
German Albums (Offizielle Top 100)	16
Hungarian Albums (MAHASZ)	22
Irish Albums (IFPI)	7
Italian Albums (FIMI)	4
Norwegian Albums (VG-lista)	1
Swedish Albums (Sverigetopplistan)	3
Swiss Albums (Schweizer Hitparade)	10
UK Albums (Official Charts)	26
US Billboard 200	143

=== Year-end charts ===
2001 year-end chart performance for Ten New Songs
Chart (2001)	Position
Belgian Albums (Ultratop Wallonia)	71
Canadian Albums (Nielsen SoundScan)	77
French Albums (SNEP)	93
Swedish Albums (Sverigetopplistan)	100
Swiss Albums (Schweizer Hitparade)	99

2002 year-end chart performance for Greatest Hits
Chart (2002)	Position
Canadian Alternative Albums (Nielsen SoundScan)	83

== Certifications ==
Certifications and sales for Ten New Songs
Region	Certification	Certified units/sales
Denmark (IFPI Danmark)	Platinum	50,000^{^}
Canada (Music Canada)	Gold	50,000^{^}
France (SNEP)	Gold	100,000^{*}
Hungary (MAHASZ)	Gold	
Ireland (IRMA)	Gold	7,500^{^}
Norway (IFPI Norway)	Platinum	50,000^{*}
Poland (ZPAV)	Platinum	100,000^{*}
Spain (Promusicae)	Gold	50,000^{^}
Sweden (GLF)	Gold	40,000^{^}
Switzerland (IFPI Switzerland)	Gold	20,000^{^}
United Kingdom (BPI)	Gold	100,000^{‡}
^{*} Sales figures based on certification alone.^{^} Shipments figures based on certification alone.^{‡} Sales+streaming figures based on certification alone.
