= Outhere =

Belgian classical music and jazz publisher

Outhere Music
- Formation: 2004 (22 years ago)
- Headquarters: Brussels, Belgium
- Services: Classical music and jazz publisher
- Website: outhere-music.com

Outhere Music is a Belgian classical music and jazz publisher, directed by Charles Adriaenssen, which owns several formerly independent labels, many of them boutique early music specialists:

- Fuga Libera, a Belgian label founded in 2004 under the direction of Michel Stockhem, and which became the basis of Outhere group.
- Æon, a French specialist in contemporary music founded in 2000 and formerly directed by Damien Pousset, with some medieval releases.
- Alpha, a French early music label founded in 1999 by Jean-Paul Combet, noted for its cover artwork chosen by and commented on by Denis Grenier.
- Ramée, a German early music label founded by Rainer Arndt in 2004.
- Ricercar, a Belgian early music label founded by musician Jérôme Léjeune in the 1980s, along with the Ricercar Consort.
- Zig-Zag Territoires, a French early music label founded in 1998 by Sylvie Brély and Franck Jaffrès.
- Outnote, a new jazz label set up in 2010 by Outhere and directed by Jean-Jacques Pussiau, formerly founder of Owl Records (now owned by Universal)
- Phi, the label of Philippe Herreweghe, founded 2011
- Arcana, the label founded by the late Michel Bernstein
- HatHut, a reputed Swiss label founded by Werner X. Uehlinger specializing in jazz and contemporary music
- Analekta, a Canadian classical label founded by François Mario Labbé in 1988
- Theta, the label of Teodor Currentzis

In September 2021, Outhere acquired Channel Classics. In November 2021, the company acquired the British ICA Classics Limited. In April 2022, Outhere acquired the Canadian classics label Analekta.

In November 2023, Outhere acquired the US classics label Delos.
