= Real Emotional Girl =

Studio album by Patricia O'Callaghan
- Released: 20 March 2001
- Recorded: Orinoco Studios, London, Lydian Studios, Ottawa, Ontario, Canada
- Genre: Pop, Rock
- Length: 55:16
- Label: Marquis Records, Teldec/Atlantic
- Producer: Richard Fortin, Howard Hughes

Patricia O'Callaghan chronology
Slow Fox (1999)	Real Emotional Girl (2001)	Naked Beauty (2004)

Professional ratings
Review scores
Source	Rating
AllMusic	4.5/5 stars

Real Emotional Girl is the third solo album recorded by the Canadian singer Patricia O'Callaghan. Co-released by the Marquis and Teldec/Atlantic labels in March 2001, it features the classically trained soprano’s interpretations of several well-known popular songs, including Bob Dylan’s "Like a Rolling Stone" and Randy Newman’s "Real Emotional Girl". But rather than standard cover versions these are original, highly personalised "cabaret"-style performances – most notably so of the Dylan and Newman songs – that suggest how these songs might have sounded had they been recorded before the advent of pop music itself (such as, say, in 1920s’ Paris or Berlin). Among the other tracks are O’Callaghan's highly acclaimed version of Leonard Cohen’s "Hallelujah" and four other of his songs, including "I'm Your Man".

Real Emotional Girl was O'Callaghan's first album to be distributed in the United States and to be co-released by a major label. It received the rare accolade of a rating of four-and-a-half stars from the AllMusic website. The AllMusic reviewer J. T. Griffith wrote that O'Callaghan's interpretations "are often inspired". Christopher Loudon wrote in JazzTimes magazine that "O'Callaghan sings with a gut-level truthfulness that ranks her among the most genuine artists on the contemporary cabaret scene".

== Track listing ==
1. "Hallelujah" (Leonard Cohen) (4:02)
2. "Betterman" (Eddie Vedder) (2:50)
3. "Real Emotional Girl" (Randy Newman) (3:10)
4. "Captain Valentine's Tango" (Paul Green/Kurt Weill) (1:49)
5. "Je Rêve de Toi" (4:23)
6. "I'm Your Man" (Leonard Cohen) (3:13)
7. "Joan of Arc" (Leonard Cohen) (5:55)
8. "Nanna's Song" (Kurt Weill) (4:40)
9. "Lucky to Be Me" (Leonard Bernstein/Betty Comden/Adolph Green) (4:04)
10. "Like a Rolling Stone" (Bob Dylan) (4:35)
11. "Attendez Que Ma Joie Revienne" (2:56)
12. "Stay Well" (Maxwell Anderson/Kurt Weill) (3:37)
13. "Take This Waltz" (Leonard Cohen) (3:58)
14. "Mon Manège à Moi" (Jean Constantin/Norbert Glanzberg) (2:28)
15. "A Singer Must Die" (Leonard Cohen) (3:28)
16. "Creepin'" (Stevie Wonder) (4:54)

== Personnel ==
=== Musicians ===
- Patricia O'Callaghan – vocals
- Scott Alexander – bass
- Gini Ball – violin
- Dinah Beamish – cello
- Phil Dwyer – soprano sax
- Simon Edwards – bass
- Mark Fewer – violin
- David Heatherington – cello
- Howard Hughes – acoustic guitar, piano
- Kathleen Kajioka – viola
- Andy Morris – percussion, vibraphone
- Claire Orsler – viola
- Rob Piltch – guitar
- Chris Sharpe – bassoon
- Barry Shiffman – violin
- Anne Stephenson – violin
- Mike Sweeney – bassoon
- Tom Szczesniak – accordion
- Claudio Vena – viola

=== Recording personnel ===
- Richard Fortin – producer
- Howard Hughes – producer
- Dirk Lange – associate producer
- John "Beetle" Bailey – engineer
- Dave Pine – engineer
- George Seara – engineer
