= Mystic Mile =

Studio album by Robben Ford
- Released: September 28, 1993
- Recorded: 1993
- Studios: Sound City Studios (Van Nuys, California); Kingsound Studios (North Hollywood, California)
- Genres: Blues, rock
- Length: 55:57
- Label: Stretch
- Producers: Robben Ford; Charles Roscoe Beck; Tom Brechtlein

Professional ratings
Review scores
Source	Rating
AllMusic	4/5 stars
Jazz Forum	3/5 stars

Mystic Mile is an electric blues album by Robben Ford and the Blue Line that was released in 1993. In this second album for Stretch, Ford shows growth as songwriter besides his virtuosity as a guitarist. The album featured the collaboration of Chick Corea as executive producer.

== Track listing ==
All tracks composed by Robben Ford, except where indicated.

1. "He Don't Play Nothin' But the Blues" - 4:31
2. "Busted Up" - 4:38
3. "Politician" (Jack Bruce, Pete Brown) - 3:52
4. "Worried Life Blues" (Big Maceo Merriweather) - 6:21
5. "Misdirected Life Blues" - 4:33
6. "Moth to a Flame" - 5:19
7. "Trying to Do the Right Thing (For Anne)" - 3:30
8. "Say What's on Your Mind" (Roscoe Beck) - 5:12
9. "The Plunge" - 5:58
10. "I Don't Play" (Willie Dixon) - 4:34
11. "Mystic Mile" - 7:06

== Personnel ==
The Blue Line

- Robben Ford – acoustic guitar, electric guitar, lead vocals (1–7, 9–11), backing vocals (8), horn arrangements (8)
- Roscoe Beck – electric bass guitar, acoustic bass guitar, lead vocals (8), horn arrangements (8)
- Tom Brechtlein – drums, backing vocals (2)

Additional musicians

- Chick Corea – springs, zings and thunks (6)
- David Grissom – rhythm guitars (1, 5, 8, 9, 11), lead guitar (7)
- Bob Malach – saxophones (8), horn arrangements (8)
- Dan Fornero – flugelhorn (8), trumpet (8), horn arrangements (8)

== Production ==
- Chick Corea – executive producer
- Ron Moss – executive producer
- Robben Ford – producer
- Roscoe Beck – producer
- Tom Brechtlein – producer
- Walter New – engineer, mixing
- Jeff Sheehan – additional engineer
- Rob Ruscoe – assistant mix engineer
- Bernie Grundman – mastering at Bernie Grundman Mastering (Hollywood, California)
- Jeff "Mose" Rivera – equipment technician
- Joseph Doughney – post production
- Michael Landy – post production
- The Review Room (New York City, New York) – post production location
- Evelyn Brechtlein – Stretch production coordinator
- Michael Pollard – GRP production coordinator
- Sonny Mediana – GRP production director
- Sharon Franklin – GRP production directing assistant
- Andy Baltimore – GRP creative director
- Mike Manoogian – Stretch creative director, graphic design
- Alba Acevedo – graphic design
- Jackie Salaway – graphic design
- Karen Miller – photography, hand coloring
- Anais Browski – grooming
- Industrial Management – management
