= Take This Waltz =

Take This Waltz may refer to:

- "Take This Waltz" (song), song by Leonard Cohen
- Take This Waltz (film), a 2011 film
