= In My Secret Life =

Song by Leonard Cohen

from the album Ten New Songs
- Language: English
- Released: 2001
- Genre: Soft rock
- Length: 4:53
- Label: Columbia
- Songwriters: Leonard Cohen, Sharon Robinson
- Producer: Sharon Robinson

"In My Secret Life" is a song written and performed by Leonard Cohen and Sharon Robinson. Bob Metzger plays the guitar. The song first appears on the album Ten New Songs, released in 2001.

Cohen first revealed he was working on a new song called 'My Secret Life' in 1988, although it was not until 2001 that the song finally made it onto record. In addition to the album version of 4:53 minutes long, a promotional radio edit of 3:52 minutes was released by Sony Music Canada.

"In My Secret Life" peaked at number two on the Polish Airplay Chart in 2002.

== Music video ==
The music video for "In My Secret Life" was filmed in Montreal at Habitat 67. This building is famous for its futuristic take on architecture and was built by Jewish architect Moshe Safdie, popular for Expo 67 in 1967 as his thesis at McGill University.

== Cover versions ==
The song has been covered by Eric Burdon (on his 2004 album My Secret Life), Katie Melua (on her 2009 album Pictures), Dominique Eade, Till Brönner, Ariane Moffatt, Adan Jodorowsky (in Spanish on the documentary Hecho en México) and Tapani Kansa amongst others.

Bettye LaVette performed the song at the 2017 Tower of Song: A Memorial Tribute to Leonard Cohen concert.

== Personnel ==
- Leonard Cohen : Vocals
- Sharon Robinson : Keyboard, drum programming, bass programming, vocals.
- Bob Metzger : electric guitar
