= Old Ideas =

Studio album by Leonard Cohen
- Released: January 31, 2012
- Recorded: October 2007, January–August 2011
- Genre: Folk rock
- Length: 41:44
- Label: Columbia
- Producers: Patrick Leonard, Ed Sanders, Anjani Thomas, Dino Soldo, Mark Vreeken

Leonard Cohen chronology
Songs from the Road (2010)	Old Ideas (2012)	Popular Problems (2014)

Singles from Old Ideas
- 1. "Show Me the Place" Released: 2011; 2. "Darkness" Released: 2012

Old Ideas is the twelfth studio album by Canadian singer-songwriter Leonard Cohen, released in January 2012. It is Cohen's highest-charting release in the United States, reaching number 3 on the Billboard 200, 44 years after the release of his first album. The album topped the charts in 11 countries, including Finland, where Cohen became, at the age of 77, the oldest chart-topper, during the album's debut week. The album was released on January 27, 2012, in some countries and on January 31, 2012, in the U.S. On January 22, before its release, the album was streamed online by NPR and on January 23 by The Guardian.

== Background ==
Cohen's international concert tours of the late 2000s were prompted by the fact that his former manager made off with his life's savings. At their conclusion in 2009, Cohen decided to keep working and began making his twelfth studio album. Fans of Cohen had long become accustomed to long intervals in between albums – between 1979 and 1988 he released three – but the tour appeared to re-energize him, as biographer Sylvie Simmons observed in a 2012 Mojo cover story: "After his former manager helped herself to his savings, leaving him nothing to retire on, Leonard, in his seventies, having not been on the road in 15 years, embarked on one of the most remarkable, and remarkably successful, tours in music history, playing three-hour shows each night. And when it finished...instead of coming home and putting his feet up, he went straight to work on a new album and, even more extraordinary, in less than 12 months he finished it."

== Recording and composition ==
Old Ideas was recorded in Los Angeles at Cohen's own studio in his house and at 7th Street Sound with Patrick Leonard and Ed Sanders. Many of the songs explore some of Cohen's favorite themes: mortality, sex, depression, and the quest for love in an apocalyptic world. Discussing the song "Amen" in his review of the album in Uncut, Andy Gill observes:

Again, it's a rumination on deeper, darker matters delivered in the guise of a love song, the refrain 'Tell me that you love me, Amen' punctuating a series of requests to 'Tell me again...' that grow progressively bleaker as the song progresses: what kind of love song, for instance, includes a line like '...when the filth of the butcher is washed in the blood of the lamb'? Clearly, this is about love on a larger scale, about notions of ethics and morality being eroded away as if unnecessary for the future, as Cohen acknowledges with some asperity: '...when the victims are singing and the laws of remorse are restored.'

Religious imagery is also prevalent, and many of the songs feature Cohen on the guitar, a change from his recent albums which had been dominated by synthesizers. Cohen worked closely with co-producer Patrick Leonard, writing four of the tracks with him: the resigned "Going Home," "Show Me the Place," "Anyhow" and "Come Healing." As Cohen told Mojo in 2013, he met the producer when he was making an album with Cohen's son, singer Adam Cohen:

And I know the work he did with Madonna. I think he's a seminal figure in modern American music, very brilliant. I was listening to some of his solo piano work, too. I bumped into him with Adam several times, and somehow we got together and these four songs we did together came very quickly...Pat saw the lyric for 'Going Home' and said, 'This could be a really good song,' and I said, 'I don't think so.' He said, 'Can I have a shot at it?' I said, 'Sure.' He came back with the music, I don't know if it was the next hour or the next day but it was very fast...He is a very unusual man and, I guess, we were both in good form...

One other song, "Crazy to Love You," was the result of a collaboration with jazz singer Anjani, who had first released the song on her 2006 Cohen-produced album Blue Alert (Cohen also provided all the lyrics for the LP). The songs "Darkness" and "Lullaby" had actually been debuted on his recent tours before being committed to tape. Cohen had originally wanted to call his 2004 studio album Old Ideas but opted for Dear Heather instead, fearing that fans might mistake it for a compilation album.

== Reception ==
Professional ratings
Aggregate scores
Source	Rating
AnyDecentMusic?	8.0/10
Metacritic	85/100
Review scores
Source	Rating
AllMusic	4/5 stars
The A.V. Club	A−
The Daily Telegraph	5/5 stars
Entertainment Weekly	A−
The Guardian	4/5 stars
The Independent	4/5 stars
MSN Music (Expert Witness)	A−
Pitchfork	7.4/10
Rolling Stone	4.5/5 stars
Spin	8/10

The album received uniformly positive reviews from publications including Rolling Stone, the Chicago Tribune, and The Guardian. At a record release party for the album in January 2012, Cohen spoke with The New York Times reporter Jon Pareles who states that "mortality was very much on his mind and in his songs [on this album]." Pareles goes on to characterize the album as "an autumnal album, musing on memories and final reckonings, but it also has a gleam in its eye. It grapples once again with topics Mr. Cohen has pondered throughout his career: love, desire, faith, betrayal, redemption. Some of the diction is biblical; some is drily sardonic." In a four star review, Victoria Segal of Mojo called Old Ideas, "a quietly surprising album, full of grace, full of sadness, but also, most importantly, full of life." Uncut awarded the album four stars.

The album was named as a nominee for the 2012 Polaris Music Prize on June 14, 2012. The album was listed at No. 13 on Rolling Stone's list of the top 50 albums of 2012, saying "Cohen adapts to this uncharted age with a lifetime's worth of grace and wit." Rolling Stone also named the song Going Home the 20th best song of 2012.

Bob Dylan, who referred to Cohen as "number one", cited three songs from "Old Ideas" in his list of favourite Cohen songs: "Going Home", "Show Me the Place" and "Darkness".

A Canadian magazine compares Leonard Cohen's song "Banjo" to Nick Drake's song "Pink Moon", as they both ominously refer to mysterious objects.

== Track listing ==
All tracks are written by Leonard Cohen, except where noted.

No.	Title	Writer(s)	Producer(s)	Length
1.	"Going Home"	Cohen, Patrick Leonard	Leonard	3:51
2.	"Amen"		Ed Sanders	7:36
3.	"Show Me the Place"	Cohen, Leonard	Leonard	4:09
4.	"Darkness"		Sanders, Mark Vreeken	4:30
5.	"Anyhow"	Cohen, Leonard	Leonard	3:09
6.	"Crazy to Love You"	Cohen, Anjani Thomas	Thomas	3:06
7.	"Come Healing"	Cohen, Leonard	Leonard	2:53
8.	"Banjo"		Dino Soldo	3:23
9.	"Lullaby"		Sanders	4:46
10.	"Different Sides"		Sanders	4:06
Total length:				41:44

== Personnel ==
- Leonard Cohen – vocals (all tracks). arranging, programming, performance of basic tracks for Amen, Lullaby and Different Sides, guitar on Amen, Darkness, Crazy to Love You and Lullaby
- Patrick Leonard – music, arranging, programming and performing music for Going Home, Show Me the Place, Anyhow and Come Healing.
- E.L. Sanders – engineered Amen, Darkness (with Mark Vreeken), Lullaby and Different Sides, Crazy to Love You. Vocals and guitar on Lullaby.
- Dino Soldo – all instruments on Banjo except cornet.
- Sharon Robinson – vocals on Amen, Darkness, Banjo, Lullaby. synth bass on Amen and Lullaby.
- The Webb Sisters – vocals on Darkness
- Dana Glover – vocals on Going Home, Anyhow, Come Healing and Different Sides.
- Jennifer Warnes – vocals on Show Me the Place
- Neil Larsen – Hammond B3, piano, synth bass, percussion on Different Sides, cornet on Banjo.
- Robert Korda – violin on Amen
- Chris Wabich – drums on Amen
- Jordan Charnofsky – guitar on Amen
- Bela Santeli – violin on Going Home, Show Me the Place and Come Healing.

Darkness performed by The Unified Heart Touring Band:

- Roscoe Beck – electric bass, acoustic bass
- Javier Mas – archilaud
- Bob Metzger – guitar
- Dino Soldo – horns
- Rafael Bernardo Gayol – drums
- Neil Larsen – keyboards
- Sharon Robinson, The Webb Sisters – vocals
- Leonard Cohen – guitar and vocals

== Charts ==
=== Weekly charts ===
Chart (2012)	Peak position
Australian Albums Chart	2
Belgian Albums Chart (Flanders)	1
Belgian Albums Chart (Wallonia)	1
Canadian Albums Chart	1
Croatian Albums Chart	1
Czech Republic (IFPI)	1
Danish Albums Chart	2
Dutch Albums Chart	1
Finnish Albums Chart	1
French Albums Chart	3
Hungarian Albums Chart	1
Italian Albums Chart	14
New Zealand Albums Chart	1
Norwegian Albums Chart	1
Polish Albums Chart	1
South African Albums Chart	17
Spanish Albums Chart	1
Swedish Albums Chart	2
UK Albums Chart	2
US Billboard 200	3

=== Year-end charts ===
Chart (2012)	Position
Austrian Albums Chart	34
Belgian Albums Chart (Flanders)	4
Belgian Albums Chart (Wallonia)	13
Canadian Albums Chart	16
Dutch Albums Chart	14
Finnish Albums Chart	21
French Albums Chart	74
German Albums Chart	81
Hungarian Albums Chart	31
Polish Albums Chart	19
Spanish Albums Chart	33
Swedish Albums Chart	25
Swiss Albums Chart	30
United States Americana/Folk Albums Chart	11
United States Rock Albums Chart	55

== Certifications ==
Region	Certification	Certified units/sales
Austria (IFPI Austria)	Gold	10,000^{*}
Belgium (BRMA)	Gold	15,000^{*}
Canada (Music Canada)	Platinum	132,000
Finland (Musiikkituottajat)	Gold	16,895
France (SNEP)	Gold	50,000^{*}
Germany (BVMI)	Gold	100,000^{‡}
Ireland (IRMA)	Platinum	15,000^{^}
New Zealand (RMNZ)	Gold	7,500^{^}
Poland (ZPAV)	2× Platinum	40,000^{*}
Sweden (GLF)	Gold	20,000^{‡}
Switzerland (IFPI Switzerland)	Gold	15,000^{^}
United Kingdom (BPI)	Gold	100,000^{*}
United States	—	41,000
^{*} Sales figures based on certification alone.^{^} Shipments figures based on certification alone.^{‡} Sales+streaming figures based on certification alone.
