= Léon Gérin =

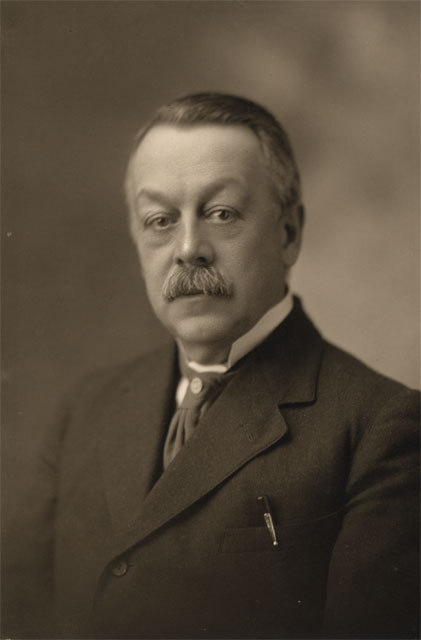
- Léon Gérin, circa 1920
- Born: May 17, 1863; Quebec City, Canada East
- Died: January 15, 1951 (aged 87); Montreal, Quebec, Canada
- Father: Antoine Gérin-Lajoie

Léon Gérin (French pronunciation: [le.ɔ̃.ʒe.ʁɛ̃]; May 17, 1863 – January 15, 1951) was a Canadian lawyer, civil servant, and sociologist.

Born in Quebec City, Canada East, the son of Antoine Gérin-Lajoie, Gérin studied at the Séminaire de Nicolet before receiving a law degree from Université Laval in 1884. In 1886, he went to Paris for a few months and became interested in sociology. Returning to Canada, he settled in Ottawa and worked for the federal government and the House of Commons of Canada.

He wrote works on a variety of subjects including the history of French colonization of the Americas and rural society in French Canada in the 19th century.

A Fellow of the Royal Society of Canada, he served as its president from 1933 to 1934 and was awarded the Lorne Pierce Medal in 1941. The Government of Quebec's Prix Léon-Gérin is named in his honour.

Professional and academic associations
Preceded by Francis Ernest Lloyd	President of the Royal Society of Canada; 1933–1934	Succeeded by W. Lash Miller
