= Live in Dublin (Leonard Cohen album) =

Live album by Leonard Cohen
- Released: 2 December 2014
- Recorded: 12 September 2013
- Venue: The O_{2} Arena, Dublin, Ireland
- Genre: Folk rock
- Length: 179:16
- Label: Columbia

Leonard Cohen chronology
Popular Problems (2014)	Live in Dublin (2014)	Can't Forget: A Souvenir of the Grand Tour (2015)

Live in Dublin is a (triple) live album by Canadian singer-songwriter Leonard Cohen. It is the audio recording of his three-hour concert on 12 September 2013 at The O_{2} Arena, Dublin, Ireland.

== Background ==
The album was released on 2 December 2014 and was recorded in September 2013 at Dublin's The O_{2} Arena. After only releasing two live albums in the first 24 years of his recording career, Live in Dublin was Cohen's fourth live LP since 2009. The album is very similar to the album Live in London (2009) but contains renditions of several songs from his more recent albums, such as "Amen", "The Darkness", "Alexandra Leaving", and "Come Healing." Also it is available in Blu Ray. The album received uniformly positive reviews upon its release, with aggregator Metacritic calculating a score of 83 out of 100 based on six reviews, indicating "Universal acclaim". While acknowledging that much of the material overlapped with the 2009 release Live in London, Rolling Stone called the new album "well worth the price". In another positive review for Exclaim!, Mackenzie Herd wrote that Cohen "still manages to mesmerize audiences around the world with perpetually relevant and insightful work, leaving packed and satisfied stadiums in his wake like he does here."

Professional ratings
Aggregate scores
Source	Rating
Metacritic	83/100
Review scores
Source	Rating
AllMusic	4/5 stars
Exclaim!	8/10
Pitchfork	8/10
Rolling Stone	3.5/5 stars

== Track listing ==
Disc one
No.	Title	Length
1.	"Dance Me to the End of Love"	5:56
2.	"The Future"	6:46
3.	"Bird on the Wire"	7:09
4.	"Everybody Knows"	5:35
5.	"Who By Fire"	8:44
6.	"The Gypsy's Wife"	6:12
7.	"The Darkness"	5:51
8.	"Amen"	8:02
9.	"Come Healing"	3:58
10.	"Lover Lover Lover"	6:49
11.	"Anthem"	8:07
Total length:		73:09

Disc two
No.	Title	Length
1.	"Tower of Song"	6:30
2.	"Suzanne"	4:25
3.	"Chelsea Hotel No. 2"	3:23
4.	"Waiting for the Miracle"	8:01
5.	"The Partisan"	5:26
6.	"In My Secret Life"	5:04
7.	"Alexandra Leaving"	7:57
8.	"I'm Your Man"	5:58
9.	"Recitation"	3:20
10.	"Hallelujah"	7:25
11.	"Take This Waltz"	5:59
Total length:		62:54

Disc three
No.	Title	Length
1.	"So Long, Marianne"	5:33
2.	"Going Home"	4:06
3.	"First We Take Manhattan"	6:40
4.	"Famous Blue Raincoat"	4:34
5.	"If It Be Your Will"	4:53
6.	"Closing Time"	5:34
7.	"I Tried to Leave You"	7:44
8.	"Save the Last Dance for Me"	4:09
Total length:		43:13

=== DVD bonus features ===
Disc four: DVD Bonus
No.	Title	Length
1.	"Show Me The Place" (04/13/13, Scotiabank Centre, Halifax, Nova Scotia)
2.	"Anyhow" (04/20/13, Mile One Centre, St. John's, Newfoundland)
3.	"Different Sides" (04/15/13, Harbour Station, Saint John, New Brunswick)

== Charts ==
=== Weekly charts ===
Chart (2014–2016)	Peak position
Austrian Albums (Ö3 Austria)	33
Belgian Albums (Ultratop Flanders)	41
Belgian Albums (Ultratop Wallonia)	78
Dutch Albums (Album Top 100)	44
French Albums (SNEP)	118
German Albums (Offizielle Top 100)	53
Hungarian Albums (MAHASZ)	33
Spanish Albums (PROMUSICAE)	79
Swiss Albums (Schweizer Hitparade)	48

=== Year-end charts ===
Chart (2015)	Position
Belgian Albums (Ultratop Flanders)	165
