= Broken Hearts & Madmen =

Studio album by Gryphon Trio
- Released: 20 September 2011
- Recorded: The Canterbury Music Company, Toronto, Ontario, Canada
- Genre: Pop, World music, Latin American music
- Length: 48:08
- Label: Analekta
- Producer: Roberto Occhipinti

Gryphon Trio chronology
Beethoven: Piano Trios, Op. 70/1, 70/2 & 11 (2011)	Broken Hearts & Madmen (2011)	For the End of Time (2012)

Professional ratings
Review scores
Source	Rating
AllMusic	4/5 stars

Broken Hearts & Madmen is an album of pop music, World music and Latin American music recorded by the Juno Award-winning Canadian chamber music ensemble the Gryphon Trio and the Canadian singer Patricia O'Callaghan that was released by the Analekta label in September 2011.

Produced by the Toronto-based jazz musician Roberto Occhipinti, the album gained a four-star rating from the AllMusic website. It contains a combination of "dark" (or what AllMusic termed "nocturnal") modern-day Anglo-Canadian folk and pop songs (Nick Drake's "River Man", Leonard Cohen's "The Gypsy's Wife", Elvis Costello's "I Want You") and mainly traditional Latin American folksongs sung (in Spanish and Portuguese) by O'Callaghan.

The AllMusic reviewer James Manheim commented: "It's not easy in this eclectic age to juxtapose musical items that have never been in proximity before, but Canada's Gryphon Trio and soprano Patricia O'Callaghan manage to do so on this recording, which proclaims itself unlike any previous chamber music album … What's striking is how well the combination of rock-era English-language music and Latin song works." The WholeNote reviewer Dianne Wells described the arrangements on the album as "brilliant", the Gryphon Trio's playing as "superb and complex", and O'Callaghan's singing as "gorgeous" and her "expert facility with languages … remarkable".

A music video of the recording of "River Man" appears on the Gryphon Trio's and O'Callaghan's official websites. Broken Hearts & Madmen was produced with financial assistance from the Government of Quebec and the Government of Canada through the Department of Canadian Heritage's Canada Music Fund.

== Track listing ==
1. "River Man" (Nick Drake, Arr.: Roberto Occhipinti) (4:06)
2. "Volver" (Carlos Gardel/Alfredo Lepera, Arr.: Roberto Occhipinti) (3:57)
3. "Cucurrucucú paloma" (Tomás Méndez, Arr.: Hilario Duran) (4:12)
4. "Los Peces" (Traditional, Arr.: Hilario Duran) (3:00)
5. "Pieces and Parts" (Laurie Anderson, Arr.: Roberto Occhipinti) (3:58)
6. "Estoy Sentado aquí" (Los Lobos, Arr.: Hilario Duran) (2:40)
7. "La Foule" (Enrique Diezo, Michel Rivgauche/Angel Cabral, Arr.: Hilario Duran) (2:55)
8. "Yo soy Maria" (Astor Piazzolla/Horacio Ferrer, Arr.: Andrew Downing) (3:16)
9. "The Gypsy's Wife" (Leonard Cohen, Arr.: Roberto Occhipinti) (5:24)
10. "Flor de la Canela" (Arsenio Rodriguez, Arr.: Hilario Duran) (4:55)
11. "La Confession" (Lhasa de Sela et al., Arr.: Roberto Occhipinti) (3:51)
12. "I Want You" (Elvis Costello, Arr.: Roberto Occhipinti) (6:38)

== Personnel ==
=== Musicians ===
- Patricia O'Callaghan – vocals
- Annalee Patipatanakoon – violin
- Roman Borys – cello
- Jamie Parker – piano

=== Recording personnel ===
- Producer – Roberto Occhipinti
- Sound Engineer – Jeremy Darby
- Mix – Jeff Wolpert, Desert Fish Studio
- Mastering – Peter J. Moore, E Room
- Assistant Engineer – Andrew Heppner
