= Live in Dublin =

Live in Dublin may refer to:

- Live in Dublin (Christy Moore album), a 1981 album by Christy Moore
- Live in Dublin, a 2004 album by Kíla
- Live in Dublin (Jeff Martin album), a 2007 album by Jeff Martin
- Bruce Springsteen with The Sessions Band: Live in Dublin, a 2007 live album by Bruce Springsteen
- Live in Dublin (Moving Hearts album), a 2008 album by Moving Hearts
- Live in Dublin, a 2008 DVD by The High Kings
- Live in Dublin (Leonard Cohen album), a 2014 album by Leonard Cohen
- Live in Dublin (Lankum album), a 2024 album by Lankum
