= Un Canadien errant =

1842 Song by Antoine Gérin-Lajoie

"Un Canadien errant" ("A Wandering Canadian") is a song written in 1842 by Antoine Gérin-Lajoie after the Lower Canada Rebellion of 1837–1838. Some of the rebels were condemned to death, others forced into exile to the United States (Note: See Schull (1996) and Bellasis (1955) for examples.) and as far as Australia. (Note: See Bergevin (1991, p. 52) for references.) Gérin-Lajoie wrote the song, about the pain of exile, while taking his classical exams at the Séminaire de Nicolet. The song has become a patriotic anthem for certain groups of Canadians who have at some point in their history experienced the pain of exile. Like with Canadians exiled following the Lower Canada Rebellion, the song has come to hold particular importance for the rebels of the Upper Canada Rebellion, and for the Acadians, who suffered mass deportation from their homeland in the Great Upheaval between 1755 and 1763. The Acadian version is known as "Un Acadien errant".

== Origins ==
Accounts of the origins of this song vary. In Souvenirs de collège, Antoine Gérin-Lajoie writes that he based his verse on an existing folk tune:

I wrote it in 1842 when I was taking my classical exams at Nicolet. I did it one night in bed at the request of my friend Cyprien Pinard, who wanted a song to the tune of 'Par derrière chez ma tante'... It was published in 1844 in the Charivari canadien with my initials (A.G.L.).

In that publication the song was titled "Le Proscrit" and the tune said to be "Au bord d'un clair ruisseau".

The melody is from the French Canadian folk tune "J'ai fait une maîtresse" (of which "Si tu te mets anguille" is also a variation). The musical form is "AABB" or double-binary, with the A phrase repeated before moving to the B phrase, which is also repeated. The musical form is reflected in the lyrics as follows:

'A' phrase, with repeat:

Un Canadien errant,
Banni de ses foyers,
Un Canadien errant,
Banni de ses foyers,

'B' phrase, with repeat:

Parcourait en pleurant
Des pays étrangers.
Parcourait en pleurant
Des pays étrangers.

The rise in the tune on the first line of the B phrase is inverted on the repeat (at the point of "en pleurant"), to make the phrase period, and thus provide closure to the AABB form.

Paul Robeson performed a bilingual version under the title "Le Canadien Errant" and recorded it in the 1950s. This version was included in his 1969 East German compilation album Amerikanische Ballade; the album was released posthumously in the United States in 1977 as American Balladeer.

American audiences were introduced to the song in 1963 with French-language performances by Ian & Sylvia. They included "Un Canadien errant" on their debut 1962 album Ian & Sylvia. They gave it further prominence at the Newport Folk Festival as recorded on the 1996 album Ian & Sylvia Live at Newport.

In the 1969 film, My Side of the Mountain, the folk singer and musicologist Theodore Bikel sings the first part of "Un Canadien Errant" and then plays a bit of it on a "homemade" reed flute. The melody refrains throughout the film.

Leonard Cohen recorded "Un Canadien errant" as "The Lost Canadian" on his 1979 Recent Songs album. His own song "The Faith", on his 2004 album Dear Heather, is based on the same melody.

American folk duo John & Mary included an arrangement by Mary Ramsey on their 1991 album Victory Gardens.

Canadian folk rock duo Whitehorse recorded "Un Canadien errant" and included it on their 2013 covers album The Road to Massey Hall. A version performed by the duo is featured on the soundtrack to One Week, a 2008 film starring Joshua Jackson.

The song also made an appearance as the location music for Canada in the Where in the World Is Carmen Sandiego video game (1996), performed by Terry Gadsden and Frederik Kinck-Petersen.

== History ==
Ernest Gagnon in Chansons populaires du Canada (Quebec City 1865) says "the original tune was 'J'ai fait une maîtresse', of which the words of the variant 'Si tu te mets anguille' are (somewhat altered) fragments." Gagnon's analysis is considered definitive.

An Acadian variation appeared in 1844 as "Un Acadien Errant", sung to the Gregorian tune "Ave Maris Stella". Otherwise, to a few (and especially to expatriate Canadians), the original song remains a patriotic song; to all, it is a poignant recollection of French Canadian history.

== Original lyrics ==
Un Canadien errant
Tune for Un Canadien errant

Original French lyrics:

Un Canadien errant,
Banni de ses foyers,
Parcourait en pleurant
Des pays étrangers.

Un jour, triste et pensif,
Assis au bord des flots,
Au courant fugitif
Il adressa ces mots:

"Si tu vois mon pays,
Mon pays malheureux,
Va, dis à mes amis
Que je me souviens d'eux.

"Ô jours si pleins d'appas
Vous êtes disparus,
Et ma patrie, hélas!
Je ne la verrai plus!

"Non, mais en expirant,
Ô mon cher Canada!
Mon regard languissant
Vers toi se portera..."

English translation

A wandering 'Canadien'
Banished from his homeland
Travelled, weeping,
through foreign lands.

One day, sad and thoughtful,
Seated on the river's bank
To the fleeing current
He spoke these words:

"If you should see my home
My sad unhappy land
Go, say to all my friends
That I remember them

"O days once so full of charm
You are all gone away
And my homeland, alas!
I'll not see her again

"No, but with my last breath
O my dear Canada!
My sad gaze
Will go to you."

== English version ==
This is the 1927 English version by John Murray Gibbon. Only the first verse preserves the ABAB rhyme pattern of the original French; thereafter it varies. The use of the word lad here means a young adult man, as was common in the time period.

Once a Canadian lad,
Exiled from hearth and home,
Wandered, alone and sad,
Through alien lands unknown.

Down by a rushing stream,
Thoughtful and sad one day,
He watched the water pass
And to it he did say:

"If you should reach my land,
My most unhappy land,
Please speak to all my friends
So they will understand.

"Tell them how much I wish
That I could be once more
In my beloved land
That I will see no more.

"My own beloved land
I'll not forget till death,
And I will speak of her
With my last dying breath.

"My own beloved land
I'll not forget till death,
And I will speak of her
With my last dying breath."
