= Roscoe Beck =

Bass player

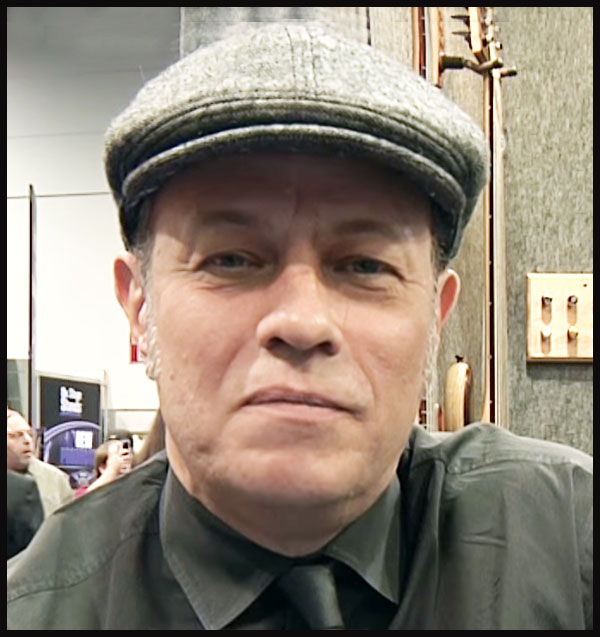
- Roscoe Beck 2012

Background information
- Born: Charles Roscoe Beck; April 6, 1954 (age 72); New York, United States
- Genres: Blues; soul; jazz; rock
- Occupations: Musician; bassist
- Instruments: Bass guitar; vocals
- Years active: 1971–present

Charles Roscoe Beck (born April 6, 1954) is an American bassist with a reputation as "a solid bottom-liner". Beck has played with artists like Robben Ford, Eric Johnson, Leonard Cohen, and The Chicks. He is also a successful record producer with two Grammy Award nominations.

== Career ==
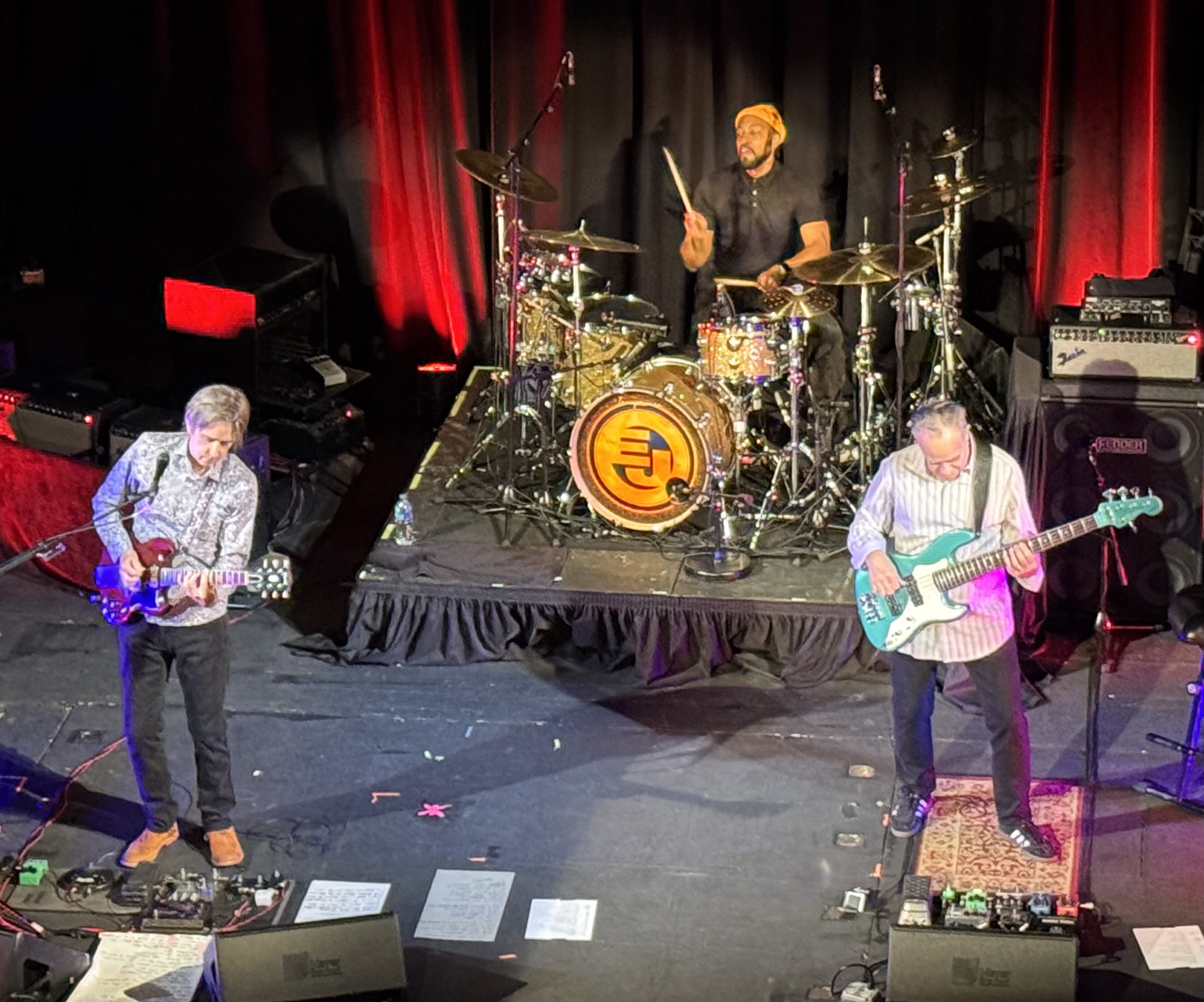
Beck (right) performing with Eric Johnson in 2025

Roscoe Beck is from Poughkeepsie, New York, and he moved in 1971 to Austin, Texas, where he met and played with Eric Johnson and brothers Stevie Ray Vaughan and Jimmie Vaughan. Later in the 1970s he formed an R&B-fusion band called "Passenger" which in 1979 played a gig in Los Angeles where Robben Ford was present and asked them to be the opening act on his tour. After having shuffled between Austin and Los Angeles for a year, Beck was asked to play on Leonard Cohen's album Recent Songs. The experience led him to start working as a record producer, and in 1986 he produced Jennifer Warnes' Grammy-nominated album Famous Blue Raincoat. He also played bass and served as musical director for Leonard Cohen's 2008–2010 and 2012–2013 world tours.

Beck played with Robben Ford through the 1980s, which in 1992 resulted in the release of the debut album of Robben Ford & The Blue Line, with Tom Brechtlein on drums. The band received a Grammy nomination for their 1993 album, Mystic Mile.

== Signature bass ==
The Fender Guitar company produced two different signature bass guitars that carried the Roscoe Beck name, available in 4 and 5-string versions. Both were based on the Fender Jazz Bass. The 5-string version was introduced in 1995, followed by a 4-string version in 2004. Discontinued in 2009.

== Discography ==
- Walk On (2005)

== Contributions ==
- Recent Songs – Leonard Cohen (1979)
- Tones (Eric Johnson) (1986)
- Famous Blue Raincoat (Jennifer Warnes) (1986)
- Talk to Your Daughter (Robben Ford) (1988)
- Ah Via Musicom (Eric Johnson) (1990)
- The Hunter (Jennifer Warnes) (1992)
- Robben Ford & The Blue Line (1992)
- Mystic Mile (Robben Ford) (1993)
- Venus Isle (Eric Johnson) (1996)
- Seven Worlds (Eric Johnson) (1998)
- Field Commander Cohen: Tour of 1979 (Leonard Cohen) (recorded 1979, released 2001)
- Bloom (Eric Johnson) (2005)
- Live in London (Leonard Cohen album) (Leonard Cohen) (2009)
- Up Close (Eric Johnson) (2010)
- Songs from the Road (Leonard Cohen album) (Leonard Cohen) (2010)
- Old Ideas (Leonard Cohen) (2012)
- Live in Dublin (Leonard Cohen album) (Leonard Cohen) (2014)
- Can't Forget: A Souvenir of the Grand Tour (Leonard Cohen) (2015)

== As a producer ==
- Famous Blue Raincoat (1987)
