= Antoine Gérin-Lajoie =

Québécois poet and novelist (1824–1882)

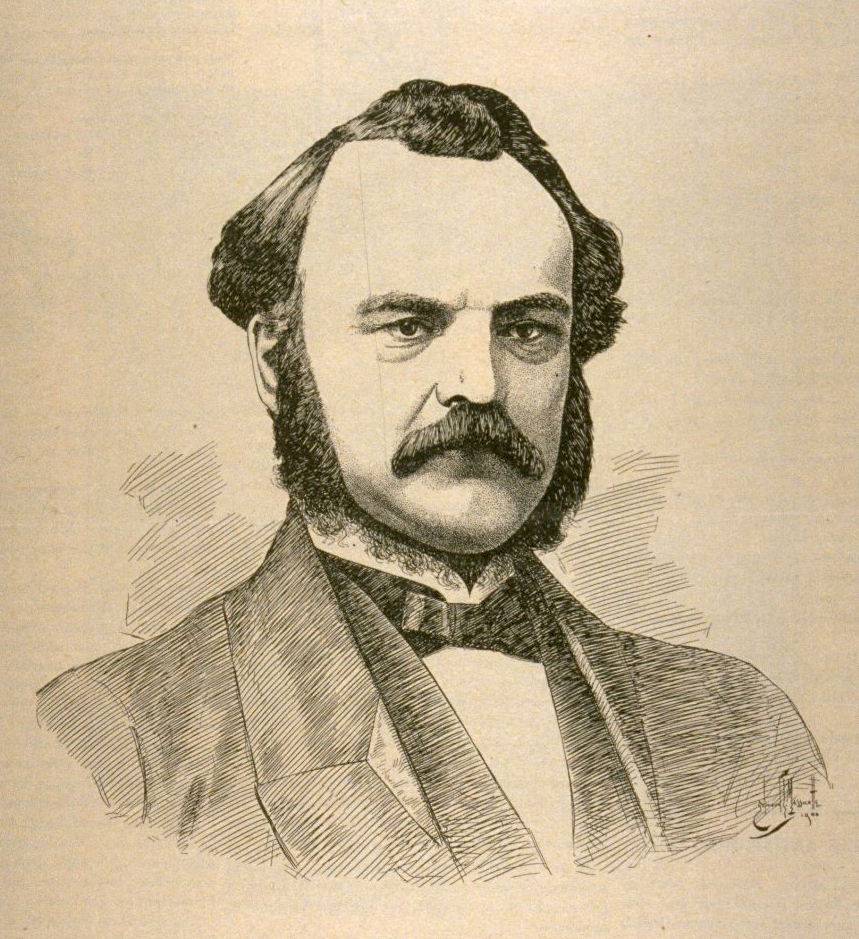
- Portrait of Antoine by Edmond-Joseph Massicotte
- Born: Antoine Gérin-Lajoie; August 4, 1824; Yamachiche, Lower Canada
- Died: August 7, 1882 (aged 58); Ottawa, Ontario, Canada
- Children: Léon Gérin
- Relatives: Elzéar Gérin (brother); Étienne Parent (father-in-law)

Antoine Gérin-Lajoie (French pronunciation: [ɑ̃twan ʒeʁɛ̃ laʒwa]; August 4, 1824 – August 7, 1882) was a Québécois Canadian lawyer, poet and novelist.

He was the author of the famous poem "Un Canadien errant" ('A Wandering Canadian'), as well as the novels roman du terroir Jean Rivard, le défricheur (1874) and its sequel, Jean Rivard, économiste (1876), among other works. He was the father of sociologist Léon Gérin.

== Early life and education ==
Antoine Gérin-Lajoie was the eldest child of Antoine Gérin-Lajoie Sr., and Marie-Amable Gélinas, who had seventeen children in all, of which ten survived childhood. His family hailed from Savoie, France, and arrived in Canada when his grandfather Jean served in the army of Louis-Joseph de Montcalm. He did his classical studies at the Séminaire de Nicolet, in Nicolet, which he entered in 1836. In 1844, he travelled to Montreal to study law, and was admitted to the Bar of Lower Canada in 1848.

== Career ==
He wrote "Un Canadien errant" in 1842 while taking his classical exams at the Séminaire de Nicolet. During his legal studies, he lived in poverty and worked for the newspaper La Minerve as a translator and corrector and later as an editor. He also served as the secretary of the Saint-Jean-Baptiste Society from 1845 until its reorganization in 1847. In 1849, he worked for the Ministry of Public Works and was named to the Library of Parliament in 1856, living alternately between Montreal and Toronto. In 1860 he moved to Quebec City when the government settled there, and became one of the founders of the literature magazines Les Soirées canadiennes and later Le Foyer canadien. His roman du terroir Jean Rivard, le défricheur appeared in the former magazine in 1862, and its sequel, Jean Rivard, économiste appeared in the latter magazine in 1864. In 1867, when the government moved to Ottawa, he moved there too where he continued to work as a librarian for the federal library. After getting struck with paralysis in 1880, he died two years later at the age of 58.
