= Joan of Arc (Leonard Cohen song) =

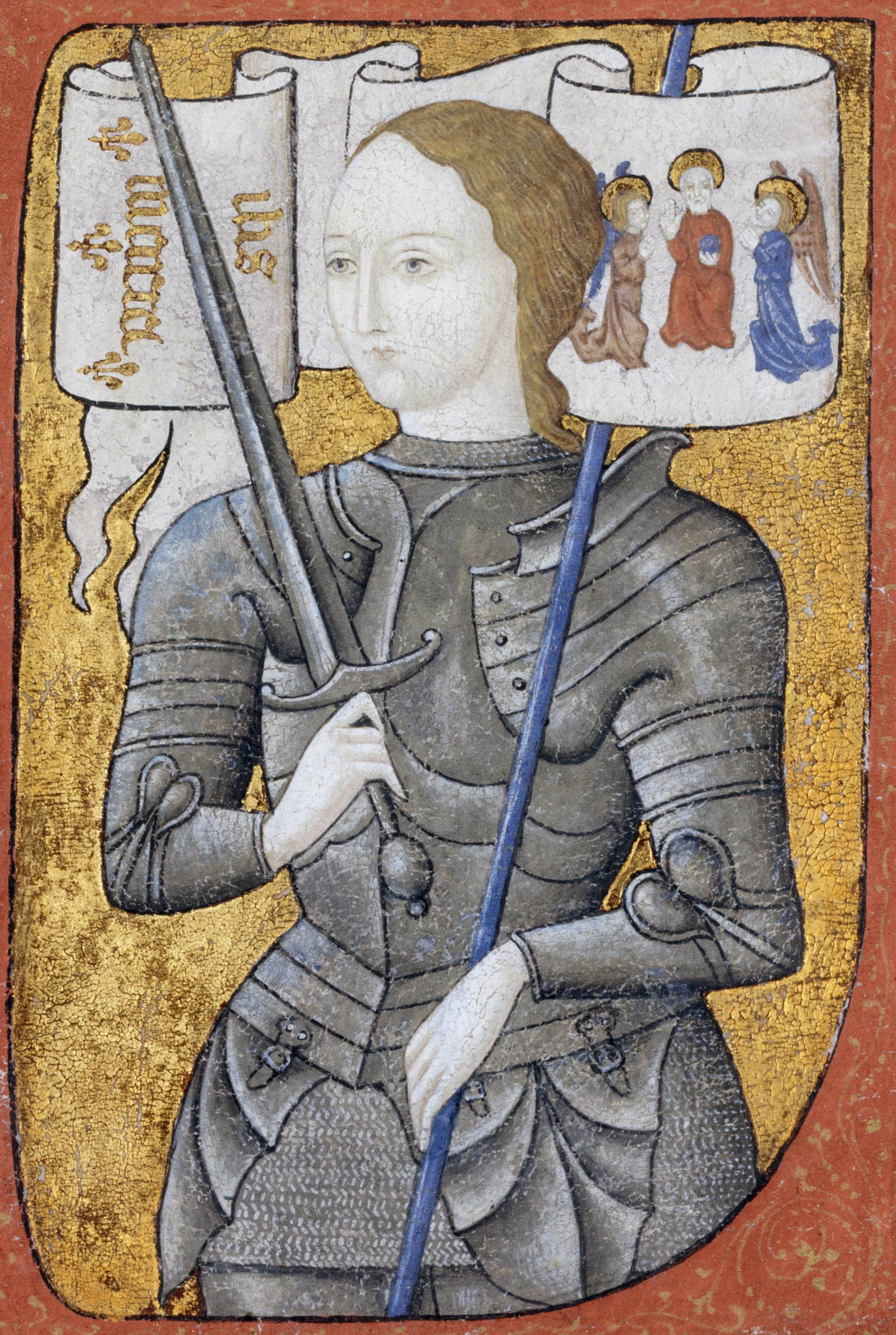

Song by Leonard Cohen

from the album Songs of Love and Hate
- Released: March 1971
- Recorded: September 22–26, 1970; August 30, 1970
- Studio: Columbia Studio A, Nashville (1st mix): Isle of Wight; Trident Studios, London (2nd mix)
- Genre: Folk rock
- Length: 6:29
- Label: Columbia Records
- Songwriter: Leonard Cohen
- Producer: Bob Johnston

"Joan of Arc" is a song by Canadian singer-songwriter Leonard Cohen. It was released as a single in March 1971 from his third album, Songs of Love and Hate. The song lasts almost six-and-a-half minutes, and is composed of four stanzas of eight lines each with a "la-la" refrain.

== Theme of the song ==
The song is constructed mainly as a dialogue between Joan of Arc and the fire which is consuming her as she burns at the stake, after having been found guilty of heresy (in 1431). In the song, Joan says that she is "tired of the war" and tells how she would rather be wearing a white wedding dress (one of the charges against her was that she dressed as a man). Joan's surrender to the fire, as its bride, may also be seen as a symbol of her religious fervor and commitment.

== Background ==
This song was apparently inspired by Cohen's love for the German singer Nico. It has also been noted that the structure in which the song is both sung and recited on parallel tracks (most obvious in the first and last four lines) was inspired by Medieval palimpsests.

== Covers and translations ==
Judy Collins performed the song during her 1970 concert tour, and a live version from that tour appeared on her 1971 album Living; Collins continued to perform the song in her concerts into the 2010s.

Jennifer Warnes covers the song on her album Famous Blue Raincoat as a duet with Cohen; a bonus live version was added to the 20th anniversary re-issue of the same album. Italian singer-songwriter Fabrizio de André wrote "Giovanna d'Arco", an Italian translation of "Joan of Arc", and included it on his 1974 album Canzoni. The Canadian singer Patricia O'Callaghan performs the song on her 2001 album Real Emotional Girl and on her 2012 album Matador: The Songs of Leonard Cohen. Irish singer, Pauline Scanlon covers it on her 2016 album Gossamer.
