= Analekta =

Canadian classical music record label

Analekta is Canada's largest independent classical music recording label.

The label, which takes its name from the Greek word ανάλεκτα (analekta, "a collection of the finest works"), was founded in 1988 by the Canadian music industry manager and entrepreneur François Mario Labbé, who is its owner and president. It is based in Montreal, Quebec, and has released more than 500 classical albums in the past 26 years.

Its first three CDs were an album by the Canadian violinist Angèle Dubeau, the first digital recording of the Red Army Choir, and a recording of the soundtrack of The Music Teacher starring José van Dam.

== History ==
In 1988, while François Mario Labbé was producing shows around the world, he had in mind three recording projects, including one from violinist Angèle Dubeau. The multinational labels at the time rarely agreed to produce music from Canadian artists, hence Labbé's motivation to create a recording company that would be focused on them.

The label's initial CD was by Angèle Dubeau, followed by the world's first digital recording of the Red Army Choir, and the soundtrack to The Music Teacher starring José van Dam.

The success of these three recordings, both nationally and internationally, led to more signings, and in 1995 the company released 40 albums.

In April 2022, Outhere, a Belgian classical music and jazz publisher, acquired Analekta.

=== Founder ===
Labbé is the founder and CEO of the Canadian classical recording label Analekta. He was honored in 2010 with the title of Knight of National Order of Quebec for his contribution to the cultural development of Quebec.

== Artists ==
Its catalogue includes recordings from major Canadian artists such as Angèle Dubeau, Alain Lefèvre, Kent Nagano and the Montreal Symphony Orchestra, Marie-Nicole Lemieux, Anton Kuerti, Gryphon Trio, Ensemble Caprice, Stick&Bow, I Musici de Montréal, and the Orchestre symphonique de Québec.
