= Gryphon Trio =

Canadian classical music ensemble

- Origin: Toronto, Ontario, Canada
- Genres: Classical, World music, Latin American music
- Years active: 1993–present
- Label: Analekta: James Campbell (clarinetist)
- Members: Annalee Patipatanakoon (violin); Roman Borys (cello); Jamie Parker (piano)
- Website: gryphontrio.com

The Gryphon Trio is a Canadian classical music ensemble that has been nominated for several and has won three Juno Awards for its classical recordings released by the Analekta label. Its members are Annalee Patipatanakoon (violin), Roman Borys (cello), and Jamie Parker (piano).

== History ==
The Gryphon Trio was formed in 1993 by three members of the Faculty of Music of the University of Toronto, Patipatanakoon, Borys and Parker, and today it tours regularly throughout Canada, the United States, and Europe.

Its 15 recordings for Analekta include works by Haydn, Mozart, Beethoven, Schubert, Mendelssohn, Dvorak, Lalo, and Shostakovich, and have expanded the number of recordings of the piano trio repertoires of these composers. In addition, the trio has commissioned and premiered more than 75 new works by contemporary composers.

The trio has received two Juno Awards for Classical Album of the Year: the first for its 2004 album Canadian Premieres, which features works by 20th-century Canadian composers, and the second for its 2011 recording of Beethoven's "Ghost" piano trio, Beethoven: Piano Trios, Op. 70, No. 1, "Ghost".

It celebrated its tenth anniversary in 2003 with a performance in Toronto that included the North American premiere of a then recently discovered piano trio score by the Romanian composer, George Enescu.

In 2008, the trio performed extensively the Greek-Canadian composer Christos Hatzis's multimedia composition Constantinople to international critical acclaim. Hatzis himself received a Juno Award for the writing of Constantinople.

In 2010, the trio launched its pioneering community outreach project 'Listen Up!' in Almonte, Ontario. With the support of the BMO Financial Group and other private sponsors, it has since travelled to Hamilton, Midland and Ottawa, Ontario.

In September 2011, with the Canadian soprano Patricia O'Callaghan, the trio released the album Broken Hearts & Madmen, which features songs by Nick Drake, Leonard Cohen, Lhasa de Sela and Elvis Costello alongside Latin American folksongs from Mexico, Argentina and Brazil.

The trio's most recent recording, For the End of Time (2012), with the Canadian clarinetist James Campbell, features the music of Olivier Messiaen, Alexina Louie and Valentyn Silvestrov and is its fifteenth CD for the Analekta label.

In 2016, the trio teamed up with McMaster University's LIVELab to research how musicians' body movements help them communicate and play as a group more effectively.

== Discography ==
- (1996) Haydn: Four Piano Trios (Analekta)
- (1998) Dvorak – Mendelssohn: Piano Trios (Analekta)
- (2002) Mendelssohn – Lalo: Piano Trios (Analekta)
- (2002) Beethoven: Piano Trios, Op. 1, Nos. 1 and 3 (Analekta)
- (2004) Canadian Premieres (Analekta)
- (2006) Mozart: Complete Piano Trios (Analekta)
- (2006) Shostakovich: Complete Works for Piano Trio/Silvestrov: Postlude DSCH (Analekta)
- (2007) Schubert: Complete Piano Trios (Analekta)
- (2008) Christos Hatzis: Constantinople (Analekta)
- (2009) Tango nuevo: Piazolla, Dúran, Ginestera (Analekta)
- (2010) Beethoven: Piano Trios, Op. 1, No. 2; Op. 97 "Archduke" (Analekta)
- (2011) Beethoven: Piano Trios, Op. 70, No. 1 "Ghost"; Op. 11 (Analekta)
- (2011) Broken Hearts & Madmen (Analekta)
- (2012) Great Piano Trios (Analekta) (9 CD compilation set)
- (2012) For the End of Time (Analekta)
