= Field Commander Cohen: Tour of 1979 =

Live album by Leonard Cohen
- Released: February 20, 2001 (copyrighted 2000)
- Recorded: December 4, 5, 6, 1979 at the Hammersmith Odeon, London and December 15, 1979 at the Dome Theatre, Brighton
- Genre: Contemporary folk
- Length: 63:03
- Label: Columbia
- Producer: Leanne Ungar

Leonard Cohen chronology
More Best of Leonard Cohen (1997)	Field Commander Cohen: Tour of 1979 (2001)	Ten New Songs (2001)

Field Commander Cohen: Tour of 1979 is a live album by Leonard Cohen, released in 2001. Songs were recorded live at the Hammersmith Odeon, London, on 4, 5, and December 6, 1979, and at the Dome Theatre, Brighton, on December 15, 1979. Cohen considered it his "best tour ever".

Accompanying Cohen was the jazz band Passenger from Austin, Texas, consisting of members Steve Meador on drums, Roscoe Beck on bass, Mitch Watkins on guitar, Bill Ginn on keyboards and Paul Ostermayer on saxophone and flute. Other tour members included violinist Raffi Hakopian, oudist John Bilezikjian, and backup singers Jennifer Warnes and Sharon Robinson. Beck would become a stalwart of Cohen's studio and live bands for more than a decade afterwards. The album cover portrait was taken by Montreal photographer, Hazel Field.

== Reception ==
Professional ratings
Review scores
Source	Rating
AllMusic	3/5 stars
Robert Christgau	(choice cut)
Pitchfork Media	8.1/10
Rolling Stone	4/5 stars

James Hunter of Rolling Stone called the LP "elaborately, and yet simply, awesome." Mark Deming of AllMusic writes that Field Commander Cohen "presents an especially strong argument for Cohen's gifts as a musician." The New York Observer also praised the album: "Mr. Cohen's voice is warm and strong throughout, and still has some of the high end that is not so evident on his last two studio albums..."

== Track listing ==
- Written by Leonard Cohen, except where noted.
1. "Field Commander Cohen" – 4:25
2. "The Window" (violin solo by Raffi Hakopian) – 5:51
3. "The Smokey Life" (duet with Jennifer Warnes) – 5:34
4. "The Gypsy's Wife" (violin solo by Raffi Hakopian) – 5:20
5. "Lover Lover Lover" (oud solos by John Bilezikjian) – 6:31
6. "Hey, That's No Way to Say Goodbye" (violin solo by Raffi Hakopian) – 4:04
7. "The Stranger Song" – 4:55
8. "The Guests" (violin solo by Raffi Hakopian) – 6:05
9. "Memories" (sax solo by Paul Ostermayer) – (Cohen, Phil Spector) 4:38
10. "Why Don't You Try" (duet with Sharon Robinson, solo by Paul Ostermayer) – 3:43
11. "Bird on the Wire" (guitar solo by Mitch Watkins) – 5:10
12. "So Long, Marianne" – 6:44

== Personnel ==
- Leonard Cohen – vocals and guitar
- Jennifer Warnes – vocals
- Sharon Robinson – vocals
- John Bilezikjian – oud and mandolin
- Raffi Hakopian – violin

Passenger

- Roscoe Beck – bass
- Bill Ginn – keyboards
- Steve Meador – drums
- Paul Ostermayer – saxophone & flute
- Mitch Watkins – electric guitar

Production

- Leanne Ungar – producer and engineer
- Bill Schnee – mixer
- Sharon Robinson – production consultant
- Bob Metzger – production consultant
