= Various Positions =

Studio album by Leonard Cohen
- Released: December 11, 1984 (Canada); December 1984 (Europe); February 1985 (UK)
- Recorded: June 1983
- Studios: Quadrasonic Sound, New York
- Genres: Soft rock, contemporary folk
- Length: 35:29
- Labels: Columbia, Passport
- Producer: John Lissauer

Leonard Cohen chronology
Recent Songs (1979)	Various Positions (1984)	I'm Your Man (1988)

Singles from Various Positions
- 1. "Dance Me to the End of Love" Released: 1984; 2. "Hallelujah" Released: 1984

Various Positions is the seventh studio album by Leonard Cohen, released in December 1984 (and February 1985). It marked not only his turn to a modern sound and use of synthesizers (particularly on the opening track), but also, after the harmonies and backing vocals from Jennifer Warnes on the previous Recent Songs (1979), an even greater contribution from Warnes, who is credited with Cohen as vocalist on all of the tracks.

== Background ==
After recording Recent Songs, Cohen did not record again for five years and published no new writing until Book of Mercy in 1984. Asked in 2001 by Mojo's Sylvie Simmons about this period of inactivity, the singer replied, "My children were living in the South of France and I spent a lot of time visiting them. The pieces in Book of Mercy were coming and I was, slowly, writing the album that ended up as Various Positions." Cohen did write and star in the 1983 made-for-TV musical I Am a Hotel, which featured several of his songs in the narration. Various Positions was produced by John Lissauer, who had been at the helm of Cohen's 1974 album New Skin for the Old Ceremony. The pair had not worked together or even spoken since a project called Songs For Rebecca had been scuttled by Cohen's manager Marty Machat to clear the way for the singer to work with Phil Spector on 1977's Death of a Ladies' Man. In the interim, Lissauer had worked with Barbra Streisand, Manhattan Transfer, and had scored films. According to Anthony Reynolds 2010 memoir Leonard Cohen: A Remarkable Life, the pair met at the Royalton on 44th Street in New York City so Cohen could play Lissauer his songs, and the producer was surprised:

... instead of presenting me with the new songs exclusively on a Spanish guitar as usual, he had this dinky little Casio keyboard with him ... The Casio was a great discovery for Leonard because these machines allows you to put one finger down and have a whole band come back at you ... and this is how he came up with "Dance Me to the End of Love".

Another alteration that Lissauer noticed was the remarkable change in Cohen's singing, with his voice having dropped about a minor third. Cohen later remarked to author Paul Zollo in the book Songwriters on Songwriting:

My voice has gotten very very deep over the years and seems even to be deepening. I thought it was because of 50,000 cigarettes and several swimming pools of whiskey that my voice has gotten low. But I gave up smoking a couple of years ago and it’s still getting deeper ... My voice really started to change around 1982. It started to deepen and I started to cop to the fact that it was deepening.

The use of synthesisers and Cohen's "new voice" would mark the beginning of a new era in Cohen's composing style and sound.

== Recording ==
The album was recorded at Quadrasonic Sound in New York in the summer of 1983 with Leanne Ungar engineering. A small core of musicians from a group called Slow Train backed Cohen on the album. Speaking with Judith Fitzgerald of The Globe and Mail in 2000, Cohen cited Various Positions as a breakthrough of sorts:

It was the first time I could really see and intuitively feel what it was I was doing, making or creating in that enterprise. After a long period of barrenness, it all just seemed to click. Suddenly, I knew these weren't discrete songs I was writing ... I could see – I could sense a unity. Various Positions had its own life, its own narrative. It was all laid out and all of a sudden it all made sense. It was almost painfully joyful, if that makes some sense. The pulling and the putting of the pieces together coherently, the being inside of that process and knowing, once I'd done that, it would be finished and I would have to leave it and go back to the world.

The album contains two songs that would become live standards for Cohen: "Dance Me to the End of Love" and "Hallelujah". In 2010, producer John Lissauer revealed to Cohen biographer Anthony Reynolds that the drum track on the former is actually from the Casio keyboard the song had been composed on: "It didn't even have audio output so we had to mike it up. We tried to do that song with real drums and percussion but he liked the simplicity of the Casio and had become accustomed to it." This explains the slight strain in Cohen's singing on the track; changing the key on the Casio would have meant altering the drum pattern that Cohen wanted to use (The song, which would become Cohen's perennial show opener, is performed in a lower key live). Although structured as a love song, "Dance Me to the End of Love" was in fact inspired by the Holocaust. In an interview, Cohen said of the song:

"Dance Me to the End Of Love" ... it's curious how songs begin because the origin of the song, every song, has a kind of grain or seed that somebody hands you or the world hands you and that's why the process is so mysterious about writing a song. But that came from just hearing or reading or knowing that in the death camps, beside the crematoria ... a string quartet was pressed into performance while this horror was going on ... they would be playing classical music while their fellow prisoners were being killed and burnt. So, that music, "Dance me to your beauty with a burning violin", meaning the beauty there of being the consummation of life, the end of this existence and of the passionate element in that consummation. But, it is the same language that we use for surrender to the beloved, so that the song – it's not important that anybody knows the genesis of it, because if the language comes from that passionate resource, it will be able to embrace all passionate activity.

Along with "Suzanne", "Hallelujah" is arguably Cohen's most famous song. The original version is in 6/8 time, which evokes both waltz and gospel music. Written in the key of C major, the chord progression matches lyrics from the song: "goes like this, the fourth, the fifth, the minor fall, and the major lift": C, F, G, A minor, F. Cohen wrote around 80 draft verses for the tune, with one writing session at the Royalton Hotel in New York where he was reduced to sitting on the floor in his underwear, banging his head on the floor. The song contains several biblical references, most notably evoking the stories of Samson and traitorous Delilah from the Book of Judges ("she cut your hair") as well as the adulterous King David and Bathsheba ("you saw her bathing on the roof, her beauty in the moonlight overthrew you"). Asked about the phenomenal success of the song in 2009, Cohen told the CBC Radio show Q:

I was happy that the song was being used. Of course, there was certain ironic and amusing sidebars because the record that it came from, which was called Various Positions, that record Sony wouldn't put out. They didn't think it was good enough ... So there was a mild sense of revenge that arose in my heart. I was happy about it but it's ... I was just reading a review of a movie called Watchmen that uses it, and the reviewer said, "Can we please have a moratorium on 'Hallelujah' in movies and television shows?" And I kind of feel the same way ... I think the song came out in '83 or '84, and the only person who seemed to recognize the song was Dylan. He was doing it in concert. Nobody else recognized the song till quite a long time later, I think.

Although it featured a more contemporary sound for its time compared with the singer's previous LPs, Columbia did not think it was commercially viable and decided not to release Various Positions in the US. Cohen has said that Walter Yetnikoff, president of the company, called him to his office in New York City and said, "Look, Leonard; we know you're great, but we don't know if you're any good." Cohen has also stated that Columbia felt it wasn't contemporary and that Yetnikoff didn't like the mix.

Various Positions was eventually picked up by the independent label Passport Records, and the album was finally included in the catalogue in 1990 when Columbia released the Cohen discography on compact disc. A remastered CD was issued in 1995.

== Reception ==
Professional ratings
Review scores
Source	Rating
AllMusic	4/5 stars
Robert Christgau	B+
Uncut	3/5 stars

Various Positions made the top ten in Spain, Portugal, and Scandinavia, and fared modestly well in the United Kingdom. In the original 1985 Rolling Stone review, Don Shewey complimented Lissauer's "lucid and beautiful production" and observed, "Many of the new songs have a surprising country & western flavor, which comes partly from the use of pedal steel guitars and partly from the simple song structures. 'Heart with No Companion' wouldn't sound out of place on a Johnny Cash record." Jason Ankeny of AllMusic calls it "a stunning return to form – Cohen's strongest work since New Skin for the Old Ceremony. Cryptic and spartan, the set continues in the eclectic vein of recent efforts, but with greater clarity and focus, resulting in an intriguingly diffuse collection ranging from the Serge Gainsbourg-esque pop of 'Dance Me to the End of Love' to the boozy, country-inflected 'The Captain.'" Writing about Cohen's approach to the album, Robert Christgau commented that "If you're sick of hearing him whisper in your ear that to be a roue is a religious calling, so be it--me, I think this is a better advertisement for middle-aged sex than Dynasty."

== Covers ==
The unusually straightforward love song "Coming Back to You" was covered by both Trisha Yearwood and Martin L. Gore on the Cohen tribute album Tower of Song. "If It Be Your Will" also appears on Tower of Song, performed by Jann Arden. The song was further covered by Anohni and the Johnsons frontwoman Anohni Hegarty for a 2005 documentary, Leonard Cohen: I'm Your Man. Ron Sexsmith performed "Heart With No Companion" on his eponymous 1995 release. In 2004, jazz singer Madeleine Peyroux covered "Dance Me to the End of Love" on her album Careless Love; the version even became a hit in Brazil. The best-known, and most-covered song on the album, however, is "Hallelujah", having been recorded by John Cale, Jeff Buckley (in one of the song's most acclaimed versions), and many others. "Hallelujah", "Dance Me to the End of Love" and "If It Be Your Will" all appear on the Canadian singer Patricia O'Callaghan's fifth solo album Matador: The Songs of Leonard Cohen released in 2011.

== Track listing ==
All songs are written by Leonard Cohen.

Side one
No.	Title	Length
1.	"Dance Me to the End of Love"	4:38
2.	"Coming Back to You"	3:32
3.	"The Law"	4:27
4.	"Night Comes On"	4:40

Side two
No.	Title	Length
5.	"Hallelujah"	4:39
6.	"The Captain"	4:06
7.	"Hunter's Lullaby"	2:24
8.	"Heart with No Companion"	3:04
9.	"If It Be Your Will"	3:43

== Personnel ==
- Leonard Cohen – lead vocals and backing vocals, acoustic guitar, electronic keyboard Casio and photography (Polaroid shot)
- John Lissauer – keyboards, synthesizers, orchestrations and backing vocals
- Sid McGinnis – electric guitar
- John Crowder – bass
- Richard Crooks – drums
- Kenneth Kosek – fiddle
- Jennifer Warnes – backing vocals
- Erin Dickins – backing vocals
- Chrissy Faith – backing vocals
- Ron Getman – backing vocals
- Lani Groves – backing vocals
- Yvonne Lewis – backing vocals
- Merle Miller – backing vocals
- Anjani Thomas – backing vocals
- David Campbell – string arrangement on "Dance Me to the End of Love"
- John Lissauer – producer and arranger
- Leanne Ungar – recording and mixing
- Lee Friedman – assistant engineer
- Jon Smith – additional recording

== Charts ==
Chart (1984–85)	Peak position
Australian Albums (ARIA)	52
Austrian Albums (Ö3 Austria)	18
Canada Top Albums/CDs (RPM)	60
Dutch Albums (Album Top 100)	12
Finnish Albums (Suomen virallinen lista)	2
German Albums (Offizielle Top 100)	43
New Zealand Albums (RMNZ)	33
Norwegian Albums (VG-lista)	3
Swedish Albums (Sverigetopplistan)	12
Swiss Albums (Schweizer Hitparade)	17
UK Albums (Official Charts)	52

== Certifications and sales ==
Certifications and sales for Various Positions
Region	Certification	Certified units/sales
Finland (Musiikkituottajat)	Gold	45,147
Portugal (AFP)	Silver	15,000
Spain (Promusicae)	Gold	50,000^{^}
United Kingdom (BPI)	Silver	60,000^{*}
^{*} Sales figures based on certification alone.^{^} Shipments figures based on certification alone.
