= Patricia O'Callaghan =

- Born: Patricia Mary O'Callaghan; 2 October 1970 (age 56); Dryden, Ontario, Canada
- Genres: Cabaret, pop, folk, contemporary opera
- Occupations: Singer, record producer
- Years active: 1997–present
- Website: patricia-ocallaghan.com

Patricia Mary O'Callaghan (born October 2, 1970) is a classically trained Canadian singer. She is a soprano who has built an international reputation as a performer of contemporary opera, early 20th-century cabaret music and the songs of Leonard Cohen.

O'Callaghan trained as an opera singer after being unable as a teenager to decide whether to become a rockstar or a nun and JazzTimes magazine has labelled her "the stunning Canadian chanteuse with the chilling soprano voice".

== Early life ==
Of Irish Catholic heritage, O'Callaghan was born in Dryden, Ontario, and spent her childhood in Iroquois Falls and other northern Canadian towns. She says that it was while she was an exchange student in Mexico that she decided that rather than becoming "either a rockstar or a nun" she would combine both these ambitions by becoming an opera singer. Her first voice teacher was Rosanne Simunovic of the Timmins Youth Singers. She went on to study music at the University of Toronto and The Banff Centre in Alberta.

== Career ==
O’Callaghan's first recording, Youkali, was released in 1997 and features cabaret songs by Kurt Weill, Erik Satie and Francis Poulenc. She followed it with Slow Fox (1999), which contains "Hallelujah", the first of her many interpretations of Leonard Cohen's songs. That year she performed in Toronto at Ted's Wrecking Yard, to an audience more accustomed to high energy rock music.

O’Callaghan released Real Emotional Girl (2001) and Naked Beauty (2004). But it was 2011–12 before her recording career appeared to hit its full stride. That year O’Callaghan sang on Broken Hearts & Madmen with the Canadian chamber music ensemble the Gryphon Trio and released Matador: The Songs of Leonard Cohen, which one critic pointed out was in several respects a better work than the 1987 Cohen tribute album Famous Blue Raincoat recorded by Jennifer Warnes. Another, Jon O’Brien, wrote in a review for the AllMusic website: “A graceful and respectful homage to a true musical icon, Matador: The Songs of Leonard Cohen cements O’Callaghan’s position as one of his most accomplished interpreters.” O’Callaghan was an artist in residence with Soulpepper Theatre Company in the Distillery District of Toronto for six years where she worked "towards her heart's ambition to bring her distinctive brand of cabaret to a broad-based audience".

O'Callaghan was featured as a singing character in the 1999 CBC Television series Foolish Heart and in the 2003 Canadian TV movie Youkali Hotel produced by Enigmatico Films and WestWind Pictures.

The singer is perhaps best known for her cover version of Cohen's "Hallelujah", recorded in 1999 and reissued in 2001 and 2012, and her many live performances of the song.

Patricia is an adjunct lecturer in the DAN School of Drama and Music at Queen's University where she teaches courses in musical theatre, cabaret and song interpretation.

== Discography ==
Solo albums

- 1997 Youkali (Marquis Classics)
- 1999 Slow Fox (Marquis Classics)
- 2001 Real Emotional Girl (Marquis Classics)
- 2004 Naked Beauty (Marquis Classics)
- 2012 Matador: The Songs of Leonard Cohen (Marquis Classics)
- 2015 Deepest December: A Christmas Album (Roaring Girl Records)
- 2025 Dark Butterflies (EP) (Patricia O'Callaghan)

Collaborative albums

- 2000 A Fine Line: Arias and Lieder (Don Byron) (Blue Note)
- 2007 Constantinople (Christos Hatzis/Gryphon Trio) (Analekta)
- 2011 Broken Hearts & Madmen (Gryphon Trio) (Analekta)
- 2013 Bohemians in Brooklyn (Tom Allen/Bryce Kulak)
- 2017 Faster Still (Brian Current) (Centrediscs/Centredisques)
- 2018 Corona Divinae Misericordiae (David Braid) (K52 Music)
