= Everybody Knows (Leonard Cohen song) =

1988 song performed by Leonard Cohen

Song by Leonard Cohen

from the album I'm Your Man
- Released: February 1988
- Genre: Synth-pop
- Length: 5:37
- Label: Columbia
- Songwriters: Leonard Cohen; Sharon Robinson

"Everybody Knows" is a song written by Canadian singer-songwriter Leonard Cohen and collaborator Sharon Robinson. It has often been covered and used in soundtracks.

== Song ==
"Everybody Knows" was first released on Cohen's album I'm Your Man, February 1988. Five minutes, 37 seconds long, "Everybody Knows" is known for its somber tone and repetition of the title at the beginning of most lines. Featuring phrases such as "Everybody knows that the dice are loaded" and "Everybody knows that the good guys lost", "Everybody Knows" has been variously described by critics as "bitterly pessimistic" yet funny, or, more strongly, a "bleak prophecy about the end of the world as we know it". The lyrics include references to AIDS, social problems, and relationships and religion.

== Soundtracks ==
"Everybody Knows" has been widely used in television and film. Allan Moyle's 1990 film Pump Up the Volume features the song prominently. A favorite of protagonist Mark Hunter (Christian Slater, as the operator of an FM pirate radio station), Cohen's song is played from an on-screen phonograph several times during Mark's clandestine broadcasts. A cover by Concrete Blonde is used at the film's end, and it is this cover version that made it onto the film's soundtrack album rather than Cohen's version.

Cohen's original version was also featured prominently in Atom Egoyan's 1994 film Exotica, as the theme music of exotic dancer Christina (Mia Kirshner) when she performs at the club of the film's title. The soundtrack album for Exotica, featuring music composed by Mychael Danna, does not include Cohen's recording of this song, either.

"Everybody Knows" was also used in an August 2008 anti-smoking advertisement commissioned by the New South Wales government in Australia with the theme "everybody knows smoking causes these diseases ... yet you still do it".

== Cover versions ==
Like many of Cohen's songs, "Everybody Knows" has been covered by several artists:

- Concrete Blonde recorded a version for the soundtrack of the 1990 film Pump Up the Volume. It was released as a promotional single in the US and reached number 20 on the Billboard Modern Rock Tracks chart. A music video was directed by Jane Simpson and produced by Silvey + Co.
- Don Henley included a cover on his Greatest hits album Actual Miles. On a 1996 VH-1 concert he performed the song as a duet with Bryan Adams. (1995)
- Rufus Wainwright, in Lian Lunson's documentary film Leonard Cohen: I'm Your Man (2005).
- Sharon Robinson herself, on her debut CD of the same title (2008).
- Stephen Stills and Judy Collins, as the title track to their album of the same name (2017).
- Sigrid, as the soundtrack for the movie Justice League (2017).
- Jim Byrnes, on his eleventh studio album Long Hot Summer Days (2017).

== Charts ==
Chart (2016)	Peak position
France (SNEP)	88

=== Concrete Blonde version ===
Chart (1990)	Peak position
US Alternative Airplay (Billboard)	20
