= Sharon Robinson (musician) =

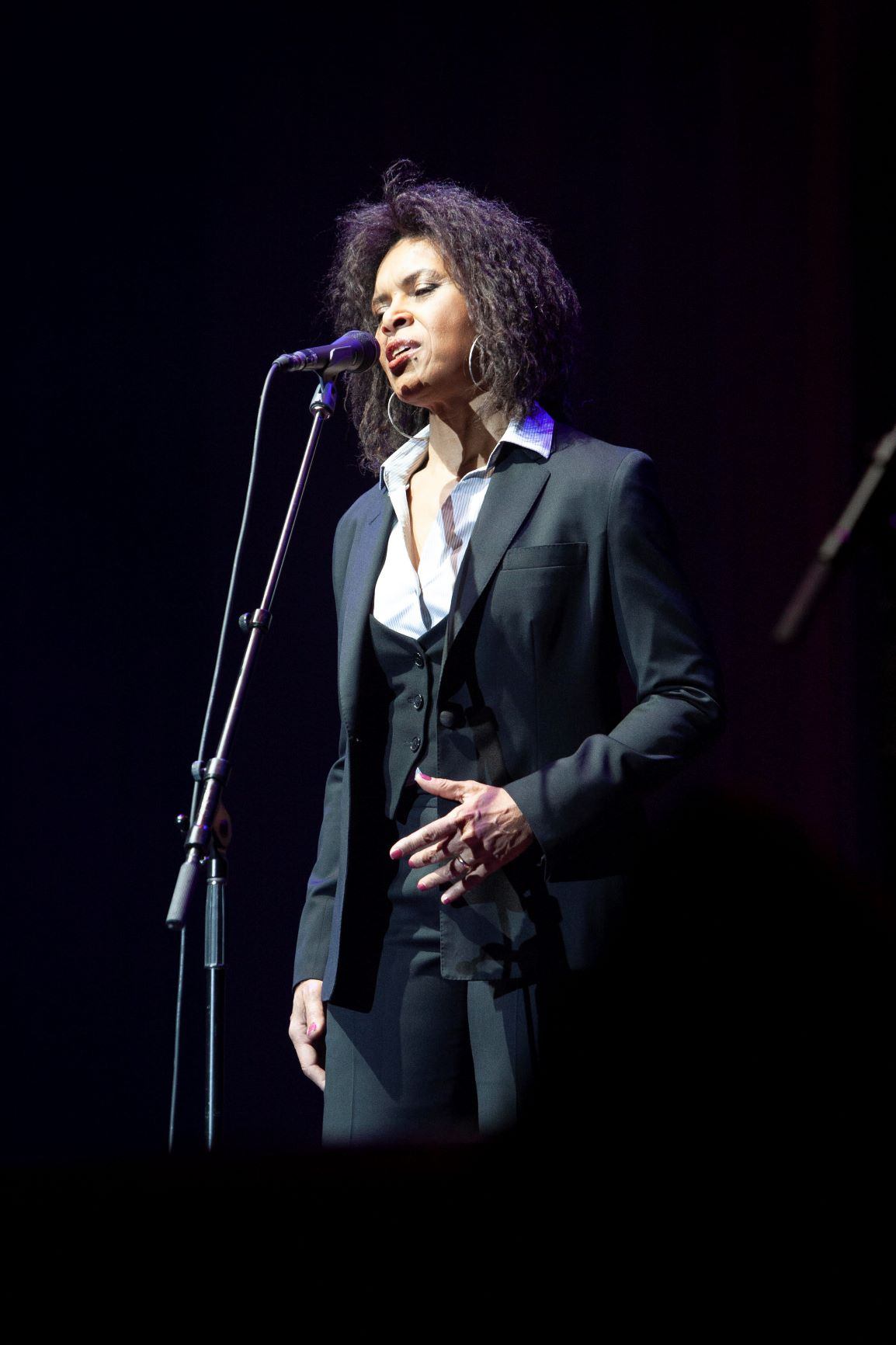
- Sharon Robinson performs live in London in 2008

Background information
- Born: 1958 (age 67–68); San Francisco, California U.S.
- Genres: Folk, folk rock, rock, adult contemporary, rhythm and blues, easy listening. world, soul, pop
- Occupations: Singer, songwriter
- Instruments: Vocals, keyboards
- Label: independent

Sharon Robinson (born in 1958 in San Francisco) is an American singer, keyboardist, songwriter, and record producer. She is best known for frequent writing and collaborating with Leonard Cohen, although she has written songs for a number of other artists including The Pointer Sisters, Aaron Neville, Brenda Russell, Diana Ross, Don Henley, Michael Bolton, Randy Crawford, Patti LaBelle, Roberta Flack, The Temptations, Bettye LaVette, and others.

== Career ==
Robinson first recorded an album on Baby Grand in 1977. Allegedly because of the tax shelter issues with the label, she was reluctant to use her own name, hence the outfit / project was named Terea (a name she had used in the past and it is believed to be her middle name). On the untitled album she is backed by members of Street Feet (who also released an album on Baby Grand in 1977).

Robinson toured as a back-up singer for Cohen in 1979 and 1980, and then again during 2008–2013. They collaborated on writing the songs "Everybody Knows" and "Waiting for the Miracle", released in 1988 and 1992 respectively. In 2001, she co-wrote, produced, arranged, and performed the backing tracks (as well as appearing alongside Cohen on the cover) for his album Ten New Songs. Robinson contributed to three tracks on Cohen's 2004 album Dear Heather, and dueted with Cohen on "The Letters".

She was given a Grammy Award in 1985 for the song "New Attitude" (from the Beverly Hills Cop soundtrack) which was recorded by Patti LaBelle. In 2004, Robinson was interviewed about her life, career, and work with Leonard Cohen.

In 2005, Robinson wrote the song "The High Road" specifically for Bettye LaVette for her album I've Got My Own Hell to Raise, which was #59 on Amazon's best of 2005 Editor's picks. Robinson's recent work includes songs written for Chris Botti.

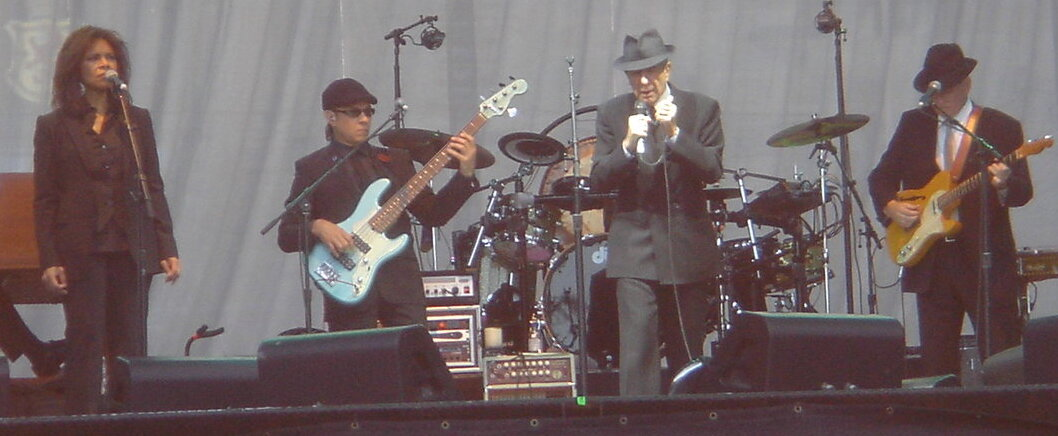
Sharon Robinson on stage with Leonard Cohen in concert at Edinburgh Castle, July 2008

In 2008, Robinson released her debut solo album Everybody Knows, which includes three songs she co-wrote with Cohen: "Alexandra Leaving", "Everybody Knows", and "Summertime", their first collaboration, originally recorded by Diana Ross for her 1987 album Red Hot Rhythm & Blues. The set includes "The High Road", and six new tracks written by Robinson. On October 27, 2008, Vibrant Records released Everybody Knows in the United Kingdom and Europe, replacing the original artwork from Leonard Cohen with a photo of Robinson. In February 2009, Vibrant Records closed due to the bankruptcy of its distributor Pinnacle. In April 2009, UK label Freeworld Records re-released Everybody Knows in Europe with the original Leonard Cohen-drawn cover art. Robinson self-released the album in the U.S.

In 2008 Robinson joined The Leonard Cohen World Tour which lasted until December 2013. In August 2013 she was profiled in a cover story in the Financial Times. A book of her photographs was released in December 2014 along with exhibits in New York and Los Angeles, and performances in those cities and Toronto. She appeared on Cohen's 2012 album Old Ideas singing, arranging choirs, and playing synth bass on four tracks. She performed songs from both her albums and also songs she co-wrote with Cohen on a tour in March and April 2015, coinciding with the release of her second solo album, entitled Caffeine performing in Belgium, Netherlands, Germany, France, Ireland, Scotland, and England. Caffeine included 10 new tracks written and produced by Robinson herself, with one song, "Lucky", co-written with Cohen in the 1980s but not recorded.

In 2015, Robinson released a four-track EP titled Sharon Robinson EP 1, covering songs by Tom Waits, Otis Redding, Bruce Hornsby, and Eric Clapton. After her second 2015 tour was postponed, she toured in Europe again in August and September 2016. In August 2016, she was the guest of honor at the 10th Leonard Cohen Event, held in Amsterdam.

== Discography ==
Leonard Cohen

- I'm Your Man (1988, wrote and composed a song, "Everybody Knows")
- The Future (1992, co-writer on a song, "Waiting For The Miracle")
- Cohen Live: Leonard Cohen In Concert (1994, co-writer on one song, "Everybody Knows")
- Field Commander Cohen: Tour of 1979 (2000, backing vocals)
- Ten New Songs (2001) (Writing, composition, keyboards, synths, vocals, arrangements)
- Dear Heather (2004; backing vocals, arrangements)
- Live in London (2009, backing vocals)
- Songs from the Road (2010, backing vocals)
- Old Ideas ( 2012, backing vocals, synth bass)
- Live in Dublin (2014, backing vocals) Also on DVD.
- Can't Forget: A Souvenir of the Grand Tour (2015, backing vocals)
- Thanks for the Dance ( 2019, percussion and vocals on a song) - With Daniel Lanois.

=== Solo albums ===
- Everybody Knows (2008) - Leonard Cohen, artwork & songwriting for three songs.
- Caffeine (2015) - Leonard Cohen songwriting on 1 song
- EP 1 (songs by Waits, Redding, Hornsby, Clapton) (2015)
- We Were Dreamers (2021)

== Bibliography ==
- 2014 : On Tour with Leonard Cohen - Photographs by Sharon Robinson - PowerHouse books ISBN 1576877256
