= List of cover versions of Leonard Cohen songs =

This is a list of recordings by other artists of songs written by Canadian singer-songwriter and poet Leonard Cohen (1934–2016).

Cohen was a songwriter before he became a recording artist, and some of his songs were recorded by other performers before Cohen released his own versions. Judy Collins, for example, recorded "Suzanne" before Cohen's first album was released. Covers subsequently became an important part of the reception of Cohen's work, with recordings by other artists helping to introduce his songs to new audiences.

The Leonard Cohen Files catalogue, A Thousand Covers Deep, documents more than 3,000 officially released cover recordings of Cohen's songs. Its scope includes recordings released on albums, EPs, singles and DVDs, while excluding performances available only as digital uploads or videos.

== Notable songs ==
=== "Suzanne" ===
"Suzanne" was recorded by several performers before and after Cohen's own recording. Judy Collins included it on her 1966 album In My Life, before Cohen released his debut album. Other recorded versions include those by Nina Simone, Joan Baez, Harry Belafonte, Graeme Allwright, Fabrizio De André, Peter Gabriel, Tori Amos and The Saints of Boogiestreet.

=== "Hallelujah" ===
"Hallelujah" is among Cohen's most widely recorded compositions. Notable recordings include versions by John Cale, Jeff Buckley, Bob Dylan, k.d. lang, Rufus Wainwright, Bono, Bon Jovi, Neil Diamond, Elisa, Pentatonix and Allison Crowe.

The song's subsequent history has been strongly associated with recordings by Cale and Buckley. Music historian Alan Light has discussed their importance in the song's rise to wider prominence, while later recordings helped establish "Hallelujah" as one of Cohen's most frequently recorded songs.

=== "Bird on the Wire" ===
Recorded versions include those by Johnny Cash, Willie Nelson, Joe Cocker, Judy Collins, k.d. lang, Perla Batalla, Jennifer Warnes, Jimmy Barnes and Troy Cassar-Daley.

=== "Famous Blue Raincoat" ===
The song has been recorded by Jennifer Warnes, Joan Baez, Tori Amos, The Handsome Family, Marissa Nadler, Allison Crowe, Jonathan Coulton, Edwina Hayes and others.

Jennifer Warnes's 1986 album Famous Blue Raincoat consists primarily of Cohen compositions and includes "First We Take Manhattan", "Bird on the Wire", "Famous Blue Raincoat", "Joan of Arc", "Ain't No Cure for Love", "Coming Back to You", "A Singer Must Die", "Came So Far for Beauty" and "Night Comes On".

=== "Everybody Knows" ===
Recorded versions include those by Don Henley, Sharon Robinson, Rufus Wainwright, Barb Jungr, Concrete Blonde, Patricia O'Callaghan, Tori Sparks and others.

=== "Dance Me to the End of Love" ===
Versions have been released by Perla Batalla, Madeleine Peyroux, Ebba Forsberg, Patricia O'Callaghan, Danièle Pascal and others.

=== "First We Take Manhattan" ===
Recorded versions include those by Joe Cocker, R.E.M., Barb Jungr, Ofer Golan and Jennifer Warnes.

=== "Chelsea Hotel #2" ===
The song has been recorded by Lana Del Rey, Rufus Wainwright, Martha Wainwright, Regina Spektor, Lloyd Cole, Marissa Nadler, Kurt Wagner and others.

=== "Joan of Arc" ===
Recorded versions include those by Fabrizio De André, Lou Reed, Anna Calvi, Judy Collins, Patricia O'Callaghan, Jennifer Warnes, Allison Crowe and others.

=== "If It Be Your Will" ===
Versions include those by Perla Batalla, Jann Arden, Jennifer Warnes, Patricia O'Callaghan, Ebba Forsberg and Lena Måndotter.

=== "So Long, Marianne" ===
Recorded versions include those by Perla Batalla, James, Noel Harrison, Ibrica Jusić, Johnny McEvoy, Georges Chelon, Cobra Verde and others.

=== "Sisters of Mercy" ===
Recorded versions include those by Beth Orton, Judy Collins, Lena Måndotter, Sting and The Chieftains.

== Tribute albums ==
Cohen's songs have also been collected on numerous tribute albums. Among the most prominent are:

- Famous Blue Raincoat (1986) — Jennifer Warnes.
- I'm Your Fan (1991) — various artists.
- Tower of Song: The Songs of Leonard Cohen (1995) — various artists.
- Bird on the Wire: The Songs of Leonard Cohen — various artists.
- A Feast of Cohen — various artists.
- Cohen Covered (2008) — various artists, issued with MOJO magazine.
- Conspiracy of Beards — collective tribute project.
- Songs of Leonard Cohen — Lena Måndotter.
- Matador — Patricia O'Callaghan.
- Strange Song — Nadia Kazmi.
- Who by Fire: Live Tribute to Leonard Cohen — First Aid Kit (2021).

The Leonard Cohen Files maintains a substantial discography of tribute albums and individual cover recordings, including releases from North America, Europe, Africa and other regions.

=== I'm Your Fan ===
I'm Your Fan is a 1991 tribute album featuring alternative and independent artists performing Cohen songs. The album includes R.E.M., Nick Cave and the Bad Seeds, John Cale, The Pixies, James, That Petrol Emotion, Ian McCulloch, The House of Love, Peter Astor, Robert Forster, Duncan Sheik and others.

MusicBrainz identifies the recordings on the release as cover recordings of Cohen compositions.

=== Tower of Song ===
Tower of Song: The Songs of Leonard Cohen is a 1995 various-artists tribute album. It includes recordings by Sting, Peter Gabriel, Billy Joel, Aaron Neville, James, The Chieftains, Elton John and other performers.

=== Cohen Covered ===
Cohen Covered was issued by MOJO in 2008. Its track list includes:

- Ian McCulloch — "Suzanne"
- Katie Melua — "In My Secret Life"
- Claudine Longet — "Hey, That's No Way to Say Goodbye"
- Dion — "Sisters of Mercy"
- Linda Thompson — "Story of Isaac"
- Eyeless in Gaza — "Priests"
- Allison Crowe — "Joan of Arc"
- Susanna and the Magical Orchestra — "Hallelujah"
- Nick Cave and the Bad Seeds — "Avalanche"
- Josh Ritter — "Chelsea Hotel #2"
- Phil Campbell — "Take This Longing"
- Martha Wainwright — "Tower of Song"
- Judy Collins — "Song for Bernadette"
- The Handsome Family — "Famous Blue Raincoat"
- David Viner — "Tonight Will Be Fine".

== Selected performers ==
Rather than providing an exhaustive table, the following list groups representative performers by the language or musical context in which their recordings appeared.

=== English-language recordings ===
- Judy Collins
- Jennifer Warnes
- John Cale
- Jeff Buckley
- Bob Dylan
- k.d. lang
- Rufus Wainwright
- Nick Cave and the Bad Seeds
- Joan Baez
- Tori Amos
- Perla Batalla
- Patricia O'Callaghan
- Madeleine Peyroux
- Marianne Faithfull
- Joe Cocker
- Johnny Cash
- Willie Nelson
- Don Henley
- Sharon Robinson
- Elton John
- Bono
- Bon Jovi
- Billy Joel
- Peter Gabriel
- Sting
- The Chieftains
- Beth Orton
- Martha Wainwright
- Lana Del Rey
- Regina Spektor
- Lloyd Cole
- Jarvis Cocker
- The Pixies
- R.E.M.
- The Jesus and Mary Chain
- The House of Love
- The Handsome Family
- Allison Crowe
- Emmylou Harris
- Nina Simone
- Harry Belafonte
- Neil Diamond
- Pentatonix
- Katie Melua
- Josh Ritter
- Linda Thompson
- Claudine Longet
- Dion
- Susanna and the Magical Orchestra
- First Aid Kit

The Leonard Cohen Files artist-indexed catalogue documents many additional performers, including artists whose recordings appeared on albums, EPs, singles and compilations.

=== French-language recordings ===
Graeme Allwright recorded numerous French adaptations of Cohen's songs, including "Suzanne", "So Long, Marianne", "Everybody Knows", "Dance Me to the End of Love", "Joan of Arc", "The Stranger Song" and others.

Other French-language interpretations and adaptations appear in the catalogues of performers such as Georges Chelon and Danièle Pascal.

=== Italian-language recordings ===
Italian adaptations and recordings include work by Fabrizio De André, who recorded versions of "Suzanne", "Joan of Arc" and "Seems So Long Ago, Nancy". Other Italian performers who have recorded Cohen songs include Francesco Baccini, Elisa and Eugenio Finardi.

=== Polish-language recordings ===
Polish translations form one of the most substantial national bodies of Cohen adaptations. Maciej Zembaty recorded more than 60 Cohen songs in Polish, including "Bird on the Wire", "Story of Isaac", "Tonight Will Be Fine", "Teachers", "Who by Fire", "Lover Lover Lover", "Sisters of Mercy", "Memories", "Diamonds in the Mine", "Hey, That's No Way to Say Goodbye", "Famous Blue Raincoat", "Suzanne", "Is This What You Wanted?" and "One of Us Cannot Be Wrong".

Other Polish performers associated with Cohen tribute recordings include Renata Przemyk, Michał Łanuszka, Marcin Styczeń and Wojtek Gęsicki.

=== Russian-language recordings ===
Russian-language adaptations form a smaller but geographically distinct part of the Cohen cover repertoire. Recordings and translations have been associated with performers including Boris Grebenshchikov, Vassily K. (Vassily Kiselev), Mikhail Rykov, Oscar Akchurin, Vadim A (Vadim Asoskov) Sergei Khrichenko, Andrew Wide Band, Maxim Bode, Darya Gurina, Zeman, Ilshat, Eli Kogan, Elena Lazurchenko, Anna Melikhova, Darya Mirnaya, Dmytro Nikitin, Alexander F. Sklyar, Vika Starikova, Anna Suvorova and Pavel Fakhrtdinov.

=== Other languages ===
Cohen's songs have also been adapted or recorded in German, Dutch, Spanish, Hebrew, Hungarian, Czech, Finnish, Swedish, Norwegian, Bengali, Estonian, Korean and other languages. The Leonard Cohen Files catalogue identifies recordings in numerous languages and includes performers from Europe, North America, Africa, Asia and Australia.

== Reception and influence ==
Cover versions have been an important part of the reception history of Cohen's songwriting. Cambridge University Press's 2026 scholarly volume The World of Leonard Cohen identifies the proliferation of covers as a significant factor in bringing Cohen's songs to new audiences and discusses the role of tribute albums such as I'm Your Fan in the revival of interest in his music.

The history of "Hallelujah" is particularly notable. The song was recorded by numerous artists following Cohen's original recording, with the versions by John Cale and Jeff Buckley playing a prominent role in its subsequent popularization. By 2008, more than 100 vocalists had recorded versions of the song.

== See also ==
- Leonard Cohen discography
- Leonard Cohen
- I'm Your Fan
- Tower of Song: The Songs of Leonard Cohen
- Famous Blue Raincoat
