= First We Take Manhattan =

1987 song written by Leonard Cohen

Single by Jennifer Warnes

from the album Famous Blue Raincoat
- B-side: "Famous Blue Raincoat"
- Released: 1987
- Recorded: Spring 1986
- Genre: Folk rock
- Length: 3:32
- Label: Ariola; Attic
- Songwriter: Leonard Cohen
- Producers: C. Roscoe Beck; Jennifer Warnes

Jennifer Warnes singles chronology
"All the Right Moves" (1983)	"First We Take Manhattan" (1987)	"Bird on a Wire" (1987)

Music video
- "First We Take Manhattan" on YouTube

"First We Take Manhattan" is a song written by Canadian folk singer and songwriter Leonard Cohen. It was originally recorded by American singer Jennifer Warnes on her sixth studio album Famous Blue Raincoat (1986), a tribute to Cohen which consisted entirely of songs written or co-written by Cohen.

== Meaning ==
The song's oblique lyrics are suggestive of religious and end time themes, with references to prayer, meaningful birthmarks and signs in the sky. Writing for The Guardian in 2015, Ben Hewitt drew attention to the lyrics' apocalyptic nature, imagining Cohen "greedily eyeing world domination like a Bond villain". Rolling Stone magazine's Mikal Gilmore similarly described the song as a threatening vision of "social collapse and a terrorist's revenge". The Daily Telegraph's Robert Sandall likewise observed the prophetic character of the song, but emphasized the song's political statement, placing it in the context of the last days of the Soviet Union.

Cohen explained himself in a 1988 backstage interview: "I think it means exactly what it says. It is a terrorist song. I think it's a response to terrorism. There's something about terrorism that I've always admired. The fact that there are no alibis or no compromises. That position is always very attractive. I don't like it when it's manifested on the physical plane – I don't really enjoy the terrorist activities – but Psychic Terrorism. I remember there was a great poem by Irving Layton that I once read, I'll give you a paraphrase of it. It was 'well, you guys blow up an occasional airline and kill a few children here and there', he says. 'But our terrorists, Jesus, Freud, Marx, Einstein. The whole world is still quaking.'"

Cohen was likely referring to Layton's poem "Terrorists."

== Jennifer Warnes version ==
Warnes's original recording is notable for the distinctive driving lead guitar played by Stevie Ray Vaughan. Producer Roscoe Beck was from Austin, Texas and friends with Vaughan. In late February 1986, at the annual Grammy Awards in Los Angeles, California, Beck asked Vaughan to record the guitar for the song. In a 2007 interview, Beck recalls that Vaughan did not have his guitar or amp with him, and used one of Beck's old Stratocasters instead. After working on a few technical problems, the finished recording was achieved after two or three takes. According to Jennifer Warnes's official site, Vaughan finished recording his takes at 4:00 a.m.

=== Music video ===
The music video for Warnes's version of "First We Take Manhattan" was directed by Paula Walker. Filmed in New York City, the video features Stevie Ray Vaughan playing his weathered "Number One" guitar (with its distinctive "SRV" logo) on the Brooklyn Bridge. Cohen also appears with Warnes in the video. The 20th anniversary edition of the music video contains a German intro about the West Berlin discotheque bombing.

The album version of the song is 3:47 in length, whereas the single is 3:32 long. A promotional twelve-inch single version, entitled "Jennifer Warnes — First We Take Manhattan, Radio Remix — featuring Stevie Ray Vaughan", contained extended and edited versions.

=== Personnel ===
- Jennifer Warnes – vocals
- Stevie Ray Vaughan – lead guitar
- Robben Ford – guitar
- Roscoe Beck – bass guitar
- Vinnie Colaiuta – drums
- Lenny Castro – percussion
- Russell Ferrante – synthesizer
- Gary Chang – synthesizer programming

== Leonard Cohen version ==
"First We Take Manhattan"

Single by Leonard Cohen

from the album I'm Your Man
- Released: February 1988
- Recorded: 1987
- Genre: Synth-pop
- Length: 5:56
- Label: Columbia
- Songwriter: Leonard Cohen
- Producer: Leonard Cohen

Leonard Cohen singles chronology
"Take This Waltz" (1986)	"First We Take Manhattan" (1988)	"I'm Your Man" (1988)

Music video
- "First We Take Manhattan" on YouTube

Leonard Cohen's own synth-pop version of "First We Take Manhattan" (with additional verses) was released in February 1988 as the first track on his eighth studio album I'm Your Man. Cohen's then-girlfriend, Dominique Issermann, shot a black and white promotional video for Cohen's version of the track.

On his 1988 tour, instead of the original, Eurodisco-influenced arrangement of his studio version, Cohen introduced the new, funk-influenced arrangement, suggested by his backing vocalists Perla Batalla and Julie Christensen. He continued to perform the song this way in 1993, 2008 and 2009 tours.

Cohen's studio recording plays over the closing credits of the superhero film Watchmen (2009).

=== Personnel ===
- Jeff Fisher – arranger and performer
- Leonard Cohen – vocals and production
- Anjani – vocals
- Peter Kisilenko – bass

== Other cover versions ==
The song has been covered dozens of times. Most notably, American alternative rock band R.E.M. contributed a cover version for the Cohen tribute album I'm Your Fan (1991). Their presence on the compilation led to a re-arranging of the I'm Your Fan track list. In the U.S. release of the tribute, R.E.M.'s cover appeared as the first track, rather than the House of Love's "Who by Fire" which was the starting track in all other countries. The song also appeared as a B-side on some versions of the single "Drive." Warren Zevon covered the song throughout 1992 during his tour with Odds; with later posthumous digital archive releases of concert recordings from the tour quoting the song's lyrics for their titles as "The Monkey and the Plywood Violin (Live 1992)" recorded in Boulder, Colorado released in 2021, and "Moving Through The Station (Live Cleveland '92)" recorded in Cleveland, Ohio which was released in 2022.

British singer Joe Cocker covered "First We Take Manhattan" on his seventeenth studio album No Ordinary World (1999).

== Charts ==
=== Jennifer Warnes version ===
Chart (1987)	Peak position
Australia (Kent Music Report)	32
Canadian Hot 100	43
Canadian Hot Adult Contemporary Tracks	6
Italy Airplay (Music & Media)	11
UK singles chart	74
US Billboard Hot Adult Contemporary Tracks	29

=== R.E.M. version ===
Chart (1992)	Peak position
US Billboard Modern Rock Tracks	11
