= Tower of Song: The Songs of Leonard Cohen =

Compilation album by Various Artists
- Released: October 1995
- Genre: Rock
- Label: A&M

Various Artists chronology
I'm Your Fan (1991)	Tower of Song: The Songs of Leonard Cohen (1995)	Leonard Cohen: I'm Your Man (2006)

Professional ratings
Review scores
Source	Rating
Allmusic	2.5/5 stars

Tower of Song: The Songs of Leonard Cohen is a tribute album to Leonard Cohen, released in 1995 on A&M Records. It takes its name from a song by Cohen which originally appeared on Cohen's album I'm Your Man. However the song "Tower of Song" does not actually appear on this tribute album.

Unlike the 1991 Cohen tribute album I'm Your Fan, that was recorded by a lineup of alternative rock groups like The House of Love and the Pixies, Tower of Song featured relatively well-known, mainstream artists like Elton John, Sting with the Chieftains, Billy Joel, Peter Gabriel and Bono of U2. Phil Collins turned down the chance to contribute because he was unavailable. The album was conceived by Cohen's manager, Kelley Lynch, who, a decade later, was found liable for fraud, having drained nearly all of Cohen's life savings.

The album received a negative review from critic Roch Parisien at AllMusic, who called the album "a total train wreck". However, this view was not shared by Cohen himself, who discussed his generally positive view of the album with Chris Douridas at KCRW radio station, citing his personal preference for Billy Joel's version of "Light As the Breeze" over his own version.

== Track listing ==
1. "Everybody Knows" – Don Henley
2. "Coming Back to You" – Trisha Yearwood
3. "Sisters of Mercy" – Sting with the Chieftains
4. "Hallelujah" – Bono
5. "Famous Blue Raincoat" – Tori Amos
6. "Ain't No Cure for Love" – Aaron Neville
7. "I'm Your Man" – Elton John
8. "Bird on a Wire" – Willie Nelson
9. "Suzanne" – Peter Gabriel
10. "Light as the Breeze" – Billy Joel
11. "If It Be Your Will" – Jann Arden
12. "Story of Isaac" – Suzanne Vega
13. "Coming Back to You" – Martin Gore
