= Who by Fire =

Who by Fire may refer to:

- Who by Fire (album), by the Swedish folk duo First Aid Kit
- Who by Fire (film), a 2024 Canadian-French drama
- "Who by Fire" (song), written by Canadian poet and musician Leonard Cohen in the 1970s
- Who by Fire: Leonard Cohen in the Sinai, an account by Matti Friedman of Leonard Cohen's visit to Israel and the occupied Sinai during the Yom Kippur war
- “Who by Fire”, a 2005 short story by the Russian modern writer Victor Pelevin
