= I'm Your Fan =

I'm Your Fan: The Songs of Leonard Cohen

Compilation album by Various artists
- Released: September 30, 1991
- Genre: Alternative rock
- Length: 1:15:41
- Labels: Atlantic (U.S.), EastWest (Europe)

Professional ratings
Review scores
Source	Rating
AllMusic	4/5 stars
Chicago Tribune	3.5/4 stars
Entertainment Weekly	(C+)
Los Angeles Times	2/5 stars

I'm Your Fan: The Songs of Leonard Cohen is a tribute album to Canadian singer and songwriter Leonard Cohen, released in 1991, produced by the French music magazine Les Inrockuptibles. The album features Cohen's songs interpreted by some of the most respected rock acts of the time. Its name is a play on the title of Cohen's album I'm Your Man.

For the album's American release on Atlantic Records, R.E.M.'s rendition of "First We Take Manhattan" and House of Love's "Who by Fire" (the lead tracks on each side of the vinyl and cassette versions) were swapped so that R.E.M., one of the most popular American rock bands of the era, led the album. In all other countries where the album was released, however, the R.E.M. track appears on Side Two. In the United Kingdom, the album was distributed by record label EastWest Records, in France by Sony Music.

The album includes two different covers of "Tower of Song", one by Robert Forster and another by Nick Cave and the Bad Seeds. The latter version is a radical deconstruction of the song, edited down from an hour-long jam session held by the band.

== Track listing ==
=== Main release ===
1. "First We Take Manhattan" – R.E.M.
2. "Hey, That's No Way to Say Goodbye" – Ian McCulloch
3. "I Can't Forget" – Pixies
4. "Stories of the Street" – That Petrol Emotion
5. "Bird on the Wire" – The Lilac Time
6. "Suzanne" – Geoffrey Oryema
7. "So Long, Marianne" – James
8. "Avalanche IV" – Jean-Louis Murat
9. "Don't Go Home with Your Hard-On" – David McComb & Adam Peters
10. "Who by Fire" – The House of Love
11. "Chelsea Hotel" – Lloyd Cole
12. "Tower of Song" – Robert Forster
13. "Take This Longing" – Peter Astor
14. "True Love Leaves No Traces" – Dead Famous People
15. "I'm Your Man" – Bill Pritchard
16. "A Singer Must Die" – The Fatima Mansions
17. "Tower of Song" – Nick Cave and the Bad Seeds
18. "Hallelujah" – John Cale

==== More Fans ====
1. "The Queen and Me" – John Cale
2. "There is a War" – Ian McCulloch
3. "Suzanne" (instrumental) – Geoffrey Oryema
4. "Paperthin Hotel" – The Fatima Mansions

=== Notes ===
All songs written by Leonard Cohen with the exceptions of "Don't Go Home with Your Hard-On" and "True Love Leaves No Traces", both co-written with Phil Spector. More Fans, a free promotional bonus CD, was released in France by Fnac along with the main album. On More Fans, the John Cale track "The Queen and Me" covers the Cohen track "Queen Victoria" found on Cohen's album Live Songs.

== Cover art ==
The album cover showing children playing in water spray from a hydrant was taken by Weegee in New York's Lower West Side, in 1937.
