= Blue Alert (album) =

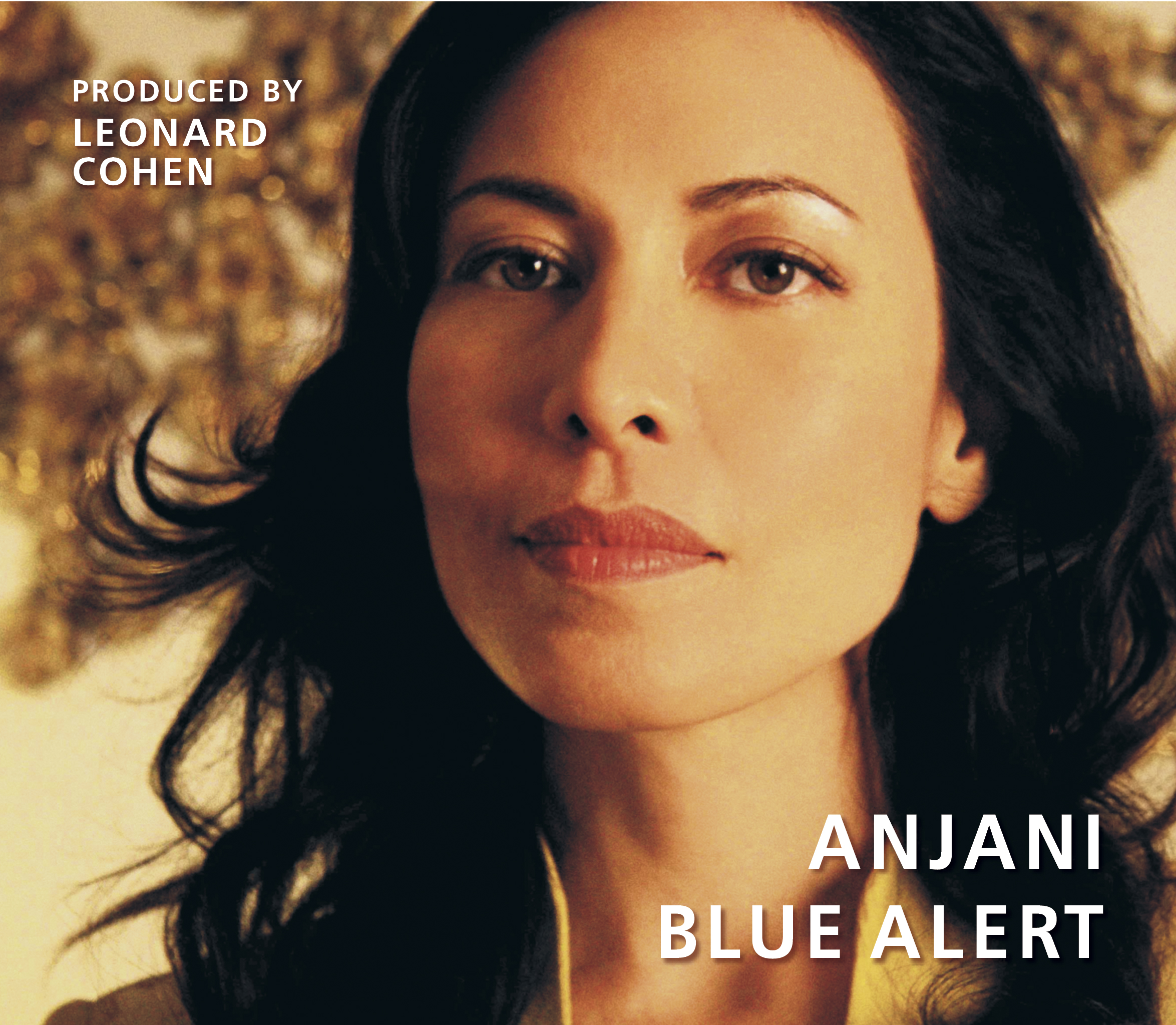

Studio album by Anjani
- Released: May 2, 2006
- Genre: Jazz
- Length: 40:38
- Label: Columbia
- Producer: Leonard Cohen

Anjani chronology
The Sacred Names (2003)	Blue Alert (2006)	I Came to Love (2014)

Professional ratings
Review scores
Source	Rating
All About Jazz	3/5 stars
AllMusic	4/5 stars
Rolling Stone	3.5/5 stars

Blue Alert is a jazz album recorded by Anjani, girlfriend and longtime backing singer of iconic Canadian singer-songwriter and poet Leonard Cohen, who also produced the album and wrote the lyrics. Also on the production team was John Lissauer, known for having previously produced two of Cohen's albums: New Skin for the Old Ceremony (1974) and Various Positions (1984).

The album was released in Canada on May 2, in the United States on May 19, and in Europe on June 5, 2006, by Columbia Records. It debuted at No. 16 on the Billboard Top Jazz Albums chart.

== Track listing ==
1. "Blue Alert" – 5:39
2. "Innermost Door" – 3:16
3. "The Golden Gate" – 3:08
4. "Half the Perfect World" – 4:06
5. "Nightingale" – 3:00
6. "No One After You" – 4:09
7. "Never Got to Love You" – 4:36
8. "The Mist" – 3:08
9. "Crazy to Love You" – 4:51
10. "Thanks for the Dance" – 4:38

All songs written by Anjani Thomas (music) and Leonard Cohen (lyrics).

"Nightingale" was previously recorded by Cohen on Dear Heather. "The Mist" contains lyrical elements from "As the Mist Leaves No Scar", the same poem "True Love Leaves No Traces" is based on (see Death of a Ladies' Man). Later (2012), Leonard Cohen recorded his own version of "Crazy to Love You" for Old Ideas, and "Thanks for the Dance" on his 2019 album of the same name.

== Personnel ==
- Leonard Cohen – arranger, producer
- Larry Corbett – cello
- Bruce Dukov – violin
- Danny Frankel – drums
- Pamela Goldsmith – viola
- Brian Leonard – violin
- Greg Leisz – lap steel guitar
- John Lissauer – clarinet, arranger, keyboards, baritone saxophone
- Jeremy Lubbock – string arrangements

Technical

- Stephen Marcussen – mastering
- Ed Sanders – producer, engineer, mixing
