= Famous Blue Raincoat (album) =

Studio album by Jennifer Warnes
- Released: November 1986
- Recorded: 1986
- Studios: The Complex, Record Plant and Salty Dog Recording (Los Angeles, California); Hollywood Sound Recorders (Hollywood, California); Amigo Studios and Mama Jo's (North Hollywood, California); The Enterprise (Burbank, California)
- Genre: Rock
- Length: 41:32
- Label: Cypress
- Producers: Roscoe Beck; Jennifer Warnes

Jennifer Warnes chronology
Shot Through the Heart (1979)	Famous Blue Raincoat (1986)	The Hunter (1992)

Famous Blue Raincoat: The Songs of Leonard Cohen is the sixth studio album recorded by the American singer Jennifer Warnes. It debuted on the Billboard 200 on February 14, 1987, and peaked at No. 72 in the US Billboard chart, No.33 in the UK albums chart, and No.8 in Canada. Originally released by Cypress Records (RCA Records in the UK), it was reissued by Private Music after Cypress went out of business. It is the only Jennifer Warnes album to make the UK albums chart (up to September 2014).

== Background ==
Released in November 1986, Famous Blue Raincoat is a tribute to Leonard Cohen, with whom Warnes had toured as a backup singer in the 1970s. The album's songs span much of Cohen's career, from his 1969 album Songs from a Room to his 1984 album Various Positions (on which Warnes sang), and even two songs ("First We Take Manhattan" and "Ain't No Cure for Love") from Cohen's then-unreleased album I'm Your Man.

The idea for the album originated when Cohen assisted Warnes with the lyrics of "Song of Bernadette" while on tour in 1979. Warnes had suggested the album at Arista Records and later MCA Records with no luck. The album's producer, C. Roscoe Beck said, "Leonard seemed to be A&R poison."

Guest contributors include guitarists Stevie Ray Vaughan, David Lindley and Robben Ford, drummer Vinnie Colaiuta, keyboardist Russell Ferrante, arranger Van Dyke Parks and Cohen himself duetting on "Joan of Arc".

The album is the first record produced by Roscoe Beck. The liner notes include a cartoon by Cohen of a torch being passed with the caption, "Jenny Sings Lenny."

In August 2007, a remastered and expanded 20th anniversary edition was released by Private Music with four bonus tracks.

== Reception ==
Professional ratings
Review scores
Source	Rating
AllMusic	4.5/5 stars
Robert Christgau	B−
PopMatters	7/10 stars

Writing retrospectively for Allmusic, music critic William Ruhlmann wrote of the album

Where other singers tended to geld Cohen's often disturbingly revealing poetry, Warnes, working with the composer himself and introducing a couple of great new songs ("First We Take Manhattan" and "Song of Bernadette," which she co-wrote), matched his own versions. The high point may have been the Warnes-Cohen duet on "Joan of Arc," but the album was consistently impressive... For Warnes, the album meant her first taste of real critical success: suddenly a singer who had seemed like a second-rate Linda Ronstadt now appeared to be a first-class interpretive artist.

In reviewing the reissue, Steve Horowitz of PopMatters noted, "This anniversary edition... may finally give the album the acclaim it initially deserved." Peter Gerstenzanga of The Village Voice wrote after the reissue,

As much as one admires Warnes's taste in songwriters, the unadorned truth is that Cohen's dark, grave voice is a better instrument for his songs. Also, his original arrangements—from solo-guitar bare to brass-band ironic—are more fitting than the slick stuff here. Stevie Ray Vaughan playing processed blues licks on "First We Take Manhattan"? Inappropriate. Smoky sax on the title track? It's a meditation on betrayal and revenge, not a lounge song. Furthermore, Warnes's melismas (think a less histrionic Ronstadt) sound sweet, not murderous.

== Track listing ==
All songs written by Leonard Cohen except where noted.

1. "First We Take Manhattan" – 3:47
2. "Bird on a Wire" – 4:42
3. "Famous Blue Raincoat" – 5:33
4. "Joan of Arc" – 7:57
5. "Ain't No Cure for Love" – 3:21
6. "Coming Back to You" – 3:43
7. "Song of Bernadette" (Jennifer Warnes, Bill Elliott, Cohen) – 3:55
8. "A Singer Must Die" – 4:52
9. "Came So Far for Beauty" (Cohen, John Lissauer) – 3:37

Additional tracks on 20th anniversary reissue

10. "Night Comes On" (new recording)
11. "Ballad of the Runaway Horse" (new recording)
12. "If It Be Your Will" (new recording)
13. "Joan of Arc" (live in Antwerp, Belgium, 1992)

== Charts ==
Chart (1987)	Peak position
Australia (Kent Music Report)	21
Canada (RPM)	8
US Billboard 200	72
Swiss Albums (Schweizer Hitparade)	18
German Albums (Offizielle Top 100)	33
Dutch Albums (Album Top 100)	30
New Zealand Albums Chart	7
Swedish Albums Chart	39
Finnish Albums (The Official Finnish Charts)	22

=== Year-end charts ===
Chart (1987)	Position
Canada (RPM)	40

== Personnel ==
- Jennifer Warnes – vocals, harmony vocals (1, 5, 9), backing vocals (2), choir (4)
- Chuck Barth – programming
- Todd Yyega – programming
- Gary Chang – synthesizers (1, 9), synthesizer programming (1, 9), synthesizer arrangements (9)
- Russell Ferrante – synthesizers (1, 4, 6)
- Bill Ginn – synthesizers (2, 4), acoustic piano (3, 4, 6, 7), string arrangements (3), string conductor (3, 7), percussion (8), conductor (8), electric piano (9)
- William D. "Smitty" Smith – synthesizers (2), Hammond organ (6)
- Bill Payne – synthesizers (5), synthesizer arrangements (5)
- Van Dyke Parks – arrangements (8), synthesizers (9), accordion (9)
- Roscoe Beck – guitars (1, 4), bass (1, 4), string bass (3, 7), additional synthesizers (4), fretless bass (9)
- Robben Ford – guitars (1, 2)
- Stevie Ray Vaughan – guitars (1)
- Michael Landau – guitars (5)
- Fred Tackett – guitars (6)
- David Lindley – lap steel guitar (6)
- Jorge Calderón – bass (2, 6)
- Richard Feves – bass (7)
- Vinnie Colaiuta – drums (1, 2, 4–6)
- Lenny Castro – percussion (1, 2)
- Larry Brown– shaker (2), tambourine (4)
- Steve Forman – percussion (5)
- David Boruff – saxophone (2)
- Paul Ostermayer – tenor saxophone (3)
- Larry Corbett – cello (3)
- Suzie Katayama – cello (3)
- Novi Novog – viola (3, 7)
- Sid Page – first violin (3, 7)
- Barbara Porter – violin (3, 7)
- Jeremy Lubbock – string arrangements (7)
- Kal David – backing vocals (2)
- Willie Green Jr. – backing vocals (2), vocals (6)
- Leonard Cohen – vocals (4), sketches
- Greg Prestopino – choir (4)
- Terry Evans – vocals (6)
- Bobby King – vocals (6)
- George Ball – vocals (8)
- David Lasley – vocals (8)
- Arnold McCuller – vocals (8)
- Joseph Powell – vocals (8)
- Tim Stone – vocals (8)
- Sharon Robinson – vocals (8)

=== Production ===
- Jennifer Warnes – producer, art direction
- Roscoe Beck – producer
- Billy Youdelman – chief engineer, recording (7)
- Csaba Petocz – recording (5)
- Frank Wolf – mixing (1, 4–6, 8, 9), recording (5), additional recording
- George Massenburg – mixing (2, 3)
- Paul Brown – recording (7)
- Steven Strassman – recording (7)
- Henry Lewy – mixing (7)
- Tim Boyle – additional recording
- Larry Brown – additional recording
- Russ Bracher – assistant engineer
- Terry Dunavan – assistant engineer
- Ken Fowler – assistant engineer
- Nyya Lark – assistant engineer
- Jeff Park – assistant engineer
- Dan Reed – assistant engineer
- Sharon Rice – assistant engineer
- Garth Richardson – assistant engineer
- Duane Seykora – assistant engineer
- Joel Stoner – assistant engineer
- Bernie Grundman – mastering at Bernie Grundman Mastering (Hollywood, California)
- Lori Nafshun – project coordinator
- Leslie Wintner – art direction, design
- Patricia Bukur – reissue design
- Harry Bowers – cover artwork
- Betsy Annas – back cover photography
- Leonard Cohen – sleeve sketches

== Certifications ==
Certifications for Famous Blue Raincoat
Region	Certification	Certified units/sales
Canada (Music Canada)	3× Platinum	300,000^{^}
United Kingdom (BPI)	Silver	60,000^{^}
^{^} Shipments figures based on certification alone.
