= The Future (Leonard Cohen album) =

Studio album by Leonard Cohen
- Released: November 24, 1992
- Recorded: January – June 1992
- Genres: Contemporary folk, soft rock
- Length: 59:42
- Label: Columbia
- Producers: Leonard Cohen, Steve Lindsey, Bill Ginn, Leanne Ungar, Rebecca De Mornay, Yoav Goren

Leonard Cohen chronology
I'm Your Man (1988)	The Future (1992)	Cohen Live (1994)

Singles from The Future
- 1. "Closing Time" Released: 1992; 2. "Democracy" Released: November 24, 1992; 3. "The Future" Released: 1993; 4. "Be for Real" Released: 1993

The Future is the ninth studio album by the Canadian singer-songwriter Leonard Cohen, released in 1992. Almost an hour in length, it was Cohen's longest album up to that date. Both the fall of the Berlin Wall and the 1992 Los Angeles riots took place while Cohen was writing and recording the album, which expressed his sense of the world's turbulence. The album was recorded with a large cast of musicians and engineers in several different studios; the credits list almost 30 female singers. The album built on the success of Cohen's previous album, I'm Your Man, and garnered overwhelmingly positive reviews. The Future made the Top 40 in the UK album charts, went double platinum in Canada, and sold a quarter of a million copies in the U.S., which had previously been unenthusiastic about Cohen's albums.

== Background ==
After touring successfully in support of his "comeback" album I'm Your Man (1988), Cohen took a year off to help his son Adam convalesce after a serious car accident in the West Indies left the young man in a coma for four months. Cohen also began a romantic relationship with the actress Rebecca De Mornay. Anthony Reynolds notes in his book Leonard Cohen: A Remarkable Life that work on Cohen's ninth studio album "was not forged in one concentrated effort. The number of studios used ran into double figures and was spread between Montreal and Los Angeles, although the original plan was to record it in Montreal only, with the same personnel that had worked on I'm Your Man. The cast brought to bear on the album was more akin to a movie production and included both a choir and an orchestra..." The songwriting process had not gotten easier for Cohen over the years; in an interview with Q, the singer admitted, "I've never found it easy to write. Period. I mean, I don't want to whine about it or anything but...it's a bitch! It's terrible work. I'm very disciplined in that I can settle down into the work situation but coming up with the words is very hard. Hard on the heart, hard on the head and it just drives you mad. Before you know it, you're crawling across the carpet in your underwear trying to find a rhyme for 'orange'. It's a terrible, cruel job. But I'm not complaining."

== Composition ==
According to Ira Nadel's 1996 Cohen memoir Various Positions, the title track was originally called "If You Could See What's Coming Next", and underwent extensive rewrites, taking up almost sixty pages in Cohen's notebook, while "Closing Time" took two years with Cohen even starting over from scratch on the song as late as March 1992. Nadel also reveals that "Anthem" was borrowed from Kabbalistic sources, especially the sixteenth-century rabbi Isaac Luria. In the Paul Zollo book Songwriters on Songwriting, Cohen explains that it takes him so long to finish songs because "Nothing works. After a while, if you stick with the song long enough it will yield. But long enough is way beyond any reasonable estimation of what you think long enough may be...'Anthem' took a decade to write. And I've recorded it three times. More." This is borne out by the fact that some of the lyrics already appear in the song "The Bells" from the soundtrack of the 1986 film Night Magic. In the same interview, Cohen spoke at length about "Democracy", admitting that he wrote 60 verses for it:

This was when the Berlin Wall came down and everyone was saying democracy is coming to the east. And I was like that gloomy fellow who always turns up at a party to ruin the orgy or something. And I said, "I don't think it's going to happen that way. I don't think this is such a good idea. I think a lot of suffering will be the consequence of this wall coming down." But then I asked myself, "Where is democracy really coming?" And it was the U.S.A....So while everyone was rejoicing, I thought it wasn't going to be like that, euphoric, the honeymoon. So it was these world events that occasioned the song. And also the love of America. Because I think the irony of America is transcendent in the song. It's not an ironic song. It's a song of deep intimacy and affirmation of the experiment of democracy in this country. That this is really where the experiment is unfolding. This is really where the races confront one another, where the classes, where the genders, where even the sexual orientations confront one another. This is the real laboratory of democracy.

Political events and history are found elsewhere on the album, with Cohen making references to Tiananmen Square, Stalin, World War II and Hiroshima. "I was living in L.A. through the riots and the earthquakes and the floods," the singer told Uncut's Nigel Williamson in 1997. "And even for one as relentlessly occupied with himself as I am it is very hard to keep your mind on yourself when the place is burning down, so I think that invited me to look out of the window." Although the tone of the album is at times sombre, it does contain much of the wry humour that is evident on Cohen's previous LP I'm Your Man. The Future also contains two cover songs—Irving Berlin's "Always" and Frederick Knight's "Be For Real"—as well as "Tacoma Trailer", the first instrumental that Cohen had ever placed on one of his studio albums. Several producers are credited on the LP, including Cohen and Rebecca De Mornay.

== Film soundtracks and covers ==
Three songs from this album, "Anthem", "The Future", and the menacing "Waiting for the Miracle" (co-written by Sharon Robinson) were used prominently on the soundtrack for Oliver Stone's 1994 film Natural Born Killers. "Waiting for the Miracle" also appeared in the film Wonder Boys starring Michael Douglas and "The Future" was featured in The Life of David Gale starring Kevin Spacey. A cover version of "Light as the Breeze" by Billy Joel appears on the tribute album Tower of Song: The Songs of Leonard Cohen released in 1995. Billy Joel included his version on his compilation Billy Joel Greatest Hits Volume III in 1997. A cover version of "Anthem" appears on the album Matador: The Songs of Leonard Cohen released by the Canadian singer Patricia O'Callaghan in 2012, and Bob Seger included a cover of "Democracy" on his 2017 album I Knew You When.

At the 2017 Tower of Song: A Memorial Tribute to Leonard Cohen concert, "Democracy" was performed by Wesley Schultz and Jeremiah Fraites of the Lumineers, and "The Future" was performed by Elvis Costello. The Lumineers would go on to include an official cover of "Democracy" as a bonus track for their third studio album, III, in 2019.

== Reception ==
Professional ratings
Review scores
Source	Rating
AllMusic	3.5/5 stars
Chicago Tribune	3.5/4 stars
Entertainment Weekly	A
Los Angeles Times	3.5/4 stars
NME	6/10
Pitchfork	8.8/10
Q	4/5 stars
Rolling Stone	4/5 stars
Spin Alternative Record Guide	8/10
The Village Voice	A−

The album charted as high as No. 36 in the UK and was phenomenally successful in Canada, going gold, platinum, and double-platinum. Cohen also won the Canadian Juno Award for Best Male Vocalist in 1993 for The Future. In his acceptance speech, he quipped, "Only in Canada could somebody with a voice like mine win Vocalist of the Year." The music video for Cohen's song "Closing Time" also won the Juno Award for Best Music Video in 1993. In the original Rolling Stone review, Christian Wright called the album "epic", enthusing "The Future might as easily have been a book: A more troubling, more vexing image of human failure has not been written." Christopher Fielder of AllMusic calls the LP "one long manifesto calling all to challenge the concepts of righteousness and despair in our modern world." In 2010 biographer Anthony Reynolds called The Future "classic big budget AOR yet with lyrics by Lorca, Bukowski and Lowell, sung by an old wino from Skid Row who really wanted to sound like Ray Charles at the Apollo."

== Track listing ==
No.	Title	Writer(s)	Producer(s)	Length
1.	"The Future"	Leonard Cohen	Leonard Cohen	6:41
2.	"Waiting for the Miracle"	Cohen; Sharon Robinson	Cohen; Yoav Goren	7:42
3.	"Be for Real"	Frederick Knight	Steve Lindsey	4:32
4.	"Closing Time"	Cohen	Leanne Ungar; Cohen	6:00
5.	"Anthem"	Cohen	Cohen; Rebecca De Mornay	6:09
6.	"Democracy"	Cohen	Cohen	7:13
7.	"Light as the Breeze"	Cohen	Bill Ginn; Cohen	7:14
8.	"Always"	Irving Berlin	Lindsey	8:04
9.	"Tacoma Trailer"	Cohen	Ginn	5:57

== Personnel ==
- Leonard Cohen – vocals, programming, saxophone on "Light as The Breeze"
- Bob Metzger, Paul Jackson Jr., Dean Parks, Dennis Herring – guitar
- Freddie Washington, Bob Glaub, Lee Sklar – bass
- Steve Lindsey, Greg Phillinganes, Jeff Fisher, Randy Kerber, John Barnes, Jim Cox, Mike Finnigan, Stephen Croes – keyboards
- Steve Meador, James Gadson, Vinnie Colaiuta, Ed Greene – drums
- Lenny Castro – percussion
- David Campbell – orchestra arrangements, conductor
- Brandon Fields, Lon Price – tenor saxophone
- Greg Smith – baritone saxophone
- Lee Thornburg – trumpet, trombone
- Bob Furgo – violin
- Anjani Thomas, Jacquelyn Gouche-Farris, Tony Warren, Valerie Pinkston-Mayo, Julie Christensen, Perla Batalla, David Morgan, Jennifer Warnes, Edna Wright, Jean Johnson, Peggi Blu – backing vocals
- The L.A. Mass Choir – choir; directed by Donald Taylor
- Jennifer Warnes – vocals

== Charts ==
Chart performance for The Future
Chart (1992–1993)	Peak position
Austrian Albums (Ö3 Austria)	5
Canada Top Albums/CDs (RPM)	7
Dutch Albums (Album Top 100)	5
European Albums (Eurotipsheet)	27
Finnish Albums (Suomen virallinen lista)	18
German Albums (Offizielle Top 100)	79
New Zealand Albums (RMNZ)	42
Norwegian Albums (VG-lista)	3
Swedish Albums (Sverigetopplistan)	5
Swiss Albums (Schweizer Hitparade)	21
UK Albums (Official Charts)	36

== Certifications and sales ==
Certifications and sales for The Future
Region	Certification	Certified units/sales
Canada (Music Canada)	2× Platinum	200,000^{^}
Sweden (GLF)	Gold	50,000^{^}
United Kingdom (BPI)	Silver	60,000^{^}
United States	—	225,000
Summaries
Worldwide	—	1,000,000
^{^} Shipments figures based on certification alone.
