= Leonard Cohen: I'm Your Man =

- Theatrical release poster
- Directed by: Lian Lunson
- Written by: Lian Lunson
- Based on: "Came So Far for Beauty" by Hal Willner
- Produced by: Lian Lunson; Bruce Davey; Mel Gibson
- Starring: Leonard Cohen; Perla Batalla; Bono; Nick Cave; Julie Christensen; Linda Thompson; Teddy Thompson; The Handsome Family; Beth Orton; Jarvis Cocker; Kate & Anna McGarrigle; Martha Wainwright; Rufus Wainwright
- Cinematography: Geoffrey Hall; John Pirozzi
- Edited by: Mike Cahill
- Music by: Leonard Cohen
- Production companies: Sundance Channel; Horse Pictures
- Distributed by: Lionsgate
- Release dates: September 11, 2005 (Toronto International Film Festival); June 21, 2006 (United States)
- Running time: 103 minutes
- Country: United States
- Language: English
- Box office: $1.4 million

Leonard Cohen: I'm Your Man is a 2005 concert film by Lian Lunson about the life and career of Leonard Cohen. It is based on a January 2005 tribute show at the Sydney Opera House titled "Came So Far for Beauty", which was presented by Sydney Festival under the artistic direction of Brett Sheehy, and produced by Hal Willner. Performers at this show included Nick Cave, Jarvis Cocker, The Handsome Family, Beth Orton, Rufus Wainwright, Martha Wainwright, Teddy Thompson, Linda Thompson, Antony, Kate & Anna McGarrigle, with Cohen's former back-up singers Perla Batalla and Julie Christensen as special guests. The end of the film includes a performance by Leonard Cohen and U2, which was not recorded live, but filmed specifically for the film at the Slipper Room in New York in May 2005.

The film premiered at the Toronto Film Festival in September 2005, and was released the same month in Canada by Lions Gate films along with the Sundance Channel. It was subsequently released in various other countries during 2006 and 2007. The film is distributed by Lions Gate Entertainment. A soundtrack CD is also available from Verve.

The DVD of the film contains extra performances.

== Soundtrack ==
The film's soundtrack was released by Verve Forecast in July 2006. It included performances mostly recorded at an earlier incarnation of the show in Brighton, May 2004.

1. Martha Wainwright, "Tower of Song"
2. Teddy Thompson, "Tonight Will Be Fine"
3. Nick Cave, "I'm Your Man"
4. Kate & Anna McGarrigle with Martha Wainwright, "Winter Lady"
5. Beth Orton, "Sisters of Mercy"
6. Rufus Wainwright, "Chelsea Hotel No. 2"
7. Anohni, "If It Be Your Will"
8. Jarvis Cocker, "I Can't Forget"
9. The Handsome Family, "Famous Blue Raincoat"
10. Perla Batalla, "Bird on the Wire"
11. Rufus Wainwright, "Everybody Knows"
12. Martha Wainwright, "The Traitor"
13. Nick Cave, Perla Batalla and Julie Christensen, "Suzanne"
14. Teddy Thompson, "The Future"
15. Perla Batalla and Julie Christensen, "Anthem"
16. Leonard Cohen and U2, "Tower of Song"
17. Laurie Anderson, "The Guests" (iTunes Store bonus track)

== Reception ==
The review aggregation website Rotten Tomatoes reported a 69% approval rating with an average rating of 6.59/10 based on 75 reviews. The website's consensus reads, "A moving, if somewhat uneven, look at the legendary singer-songwriter, I'm Your Man treats Cohen's body of work with the reverence it deserves." Metacritic assigned a score of 68 out of 100, based on 27 critics, indicating "generally favorable" reviews.

Owen Gleiberman of Entertainment Weekly gave the film a B+, and said, "I'm not generally a big fan of tribute concerts, but this is a glorious exception." Stephen Holden of The New York Times called it, "...wonderful..." Peter Travers of Rolling Stone gave it 3/4 stars, called it, "...muddled but marvelous...,” and said, "It's enough to send fans and converts alike to the Cohen library for more of the master himself." David Jones of BBC Online gave the film 3/5 stars, and said, "[the film] brims with an infectious passion for the man's melodies and sardonic wit. Unfortunately, the performances are interspersed with interview footage that is much less captivating." Jeremiah Kipp of Slant Magazine rated the film 2/5 stars and praised some of the performances, but had mixed feelings on the concert itself due to the styles of the cover songs, "lurching back and forth," between styles, and criticized the editing cuts switching between the concert footage and the documentary itself, calling it, "infuriating..."
