= Jeff Fisher (composer) =

Canadian composer

- Born: Montreal, Quebec, Canada
- Genre: Soundtrack
- Occupations: Composer; musician; arranger; orchestrator
- Instrument: Keyboards

Jeff Fisher is a SOCAN award-winning Canadian composer, producer, arranger and musician born in Montreal, Quebec. He is probably best known for composing the soundtrack for the original run of the YTV-CINAR horror anthology series, Are You Afraid of the Dark?, and has composed Proteus 2 scores for the other CINAR-produced programs including The Little Lulu Show, The Baskervilles, and Animal Crackers. Fisher worked on two of Leonard Cohen's most successful albums, I'm Your Man, arranging and playing all the music on the hit song "First We Take Manhattan", and its follow up, The Future. He has toured extensively with international recording artists.

== Career ==
In September 1978, Fisher joined Harmonium, a French-Canadian group from Quebec which had started as a folk band, but quickly developed a progressive and symphonic sound. He played keyboards and synthesizer for a year, during which they enjoyed huge popularity. In 1984, he joined UZEB, a jazz band also based in Quebec, and toured internationally with them for two years.

Fisher has collaborated with Leonard Cohen, and in 1988 worked on I'm Your Man, arranging and playing all the music on two tracks, "Jazz Police" and "First We Take Manhattan", and arranging and playing keyboards on a third, "Ain't No Cure for Love". Cohen said the arrangement on "...Manhattan" – which was crucial in the development of the album – reminded him of the work of Ennio Morricone. He also worked on Cohen's next album, The Future. Fisher has toured internationally with Céline Dion, Diane Dufresne, Jean-Pierre Ferland, Robert Charlebois, and others.

== Gear ==
- E-mu Proteus 2 Orchestral for The Little Lulu Show and Are You Afraid of the Dark? (scored for 48 episodes)
- Korg M1 for The Little Lulu Show
- Prosonus for The Little Lulu Show
