= Perla Batalla =

American singer-songwriter

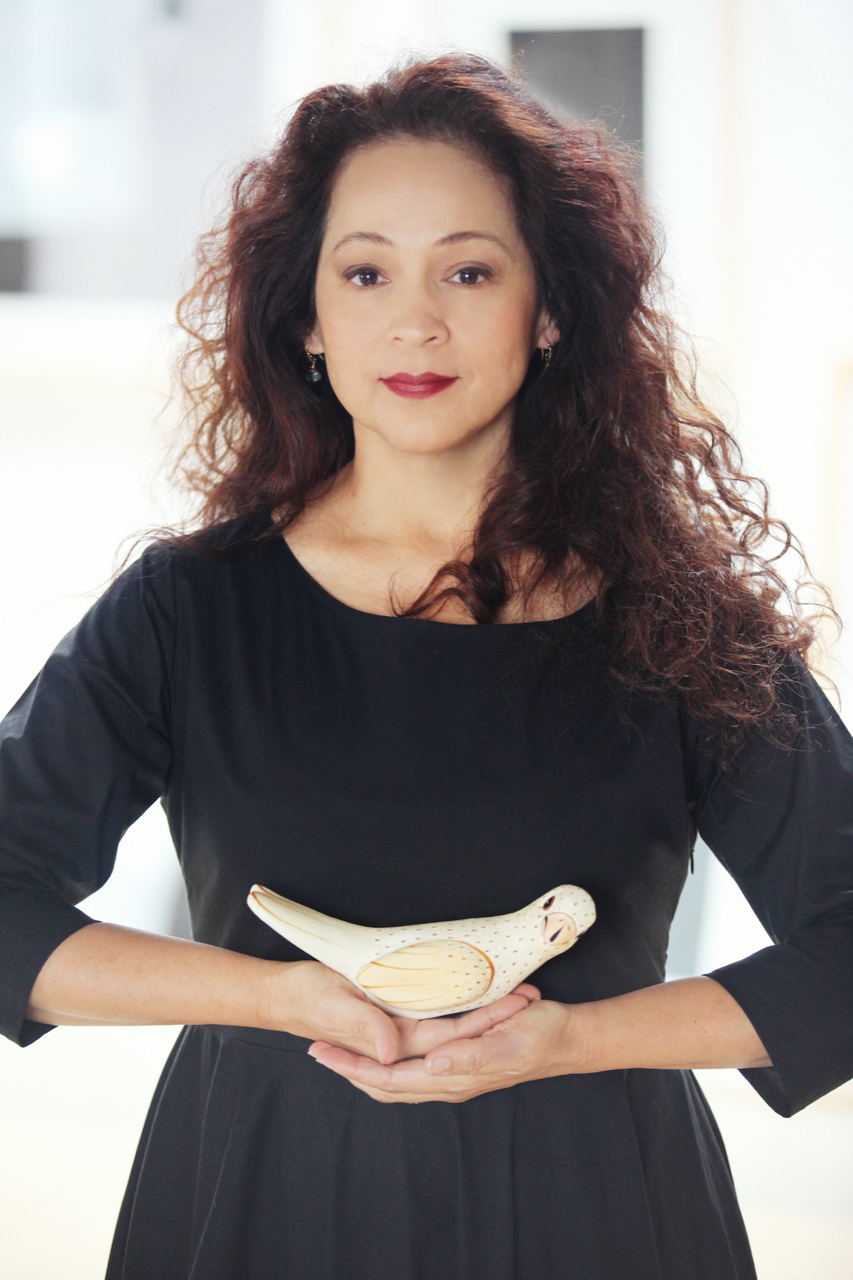
- Batalla in 2007

Background information
- Born: c. 1964 (age 61–62); Los Angeles, California, U.S.
- Occupations: Singer-songwriter
- Years active: 1988–present
- Labels: Discovery; Mechuda Music
- Website: perlabatalla.com

Perla Batalla (born c. 1964) is an American vocalist, composer and arranger who first gained international attention as a backup singer for Leonard Cohen before embarking on a solo career at his encouragement. Her debut album, Perla Batalla, was released on Discovery Records in 1994. She formed her own record label, Mechuda Music, and released the album Mestiza (meaning of mixed blood) in 1998, making sales through her website. Discoteca Batalla (2002) was recorded as an homage to her parents' record shop of the same name. In 2005, Batalla recorded a tribute album to Cohen, titled Bird on the Wire, and featured in Hal Willner's Cohen tribute concert film, Leonard Cohen: I'm Your Man.

== Career ==
=== Early life and working with Leonard Cohen ===
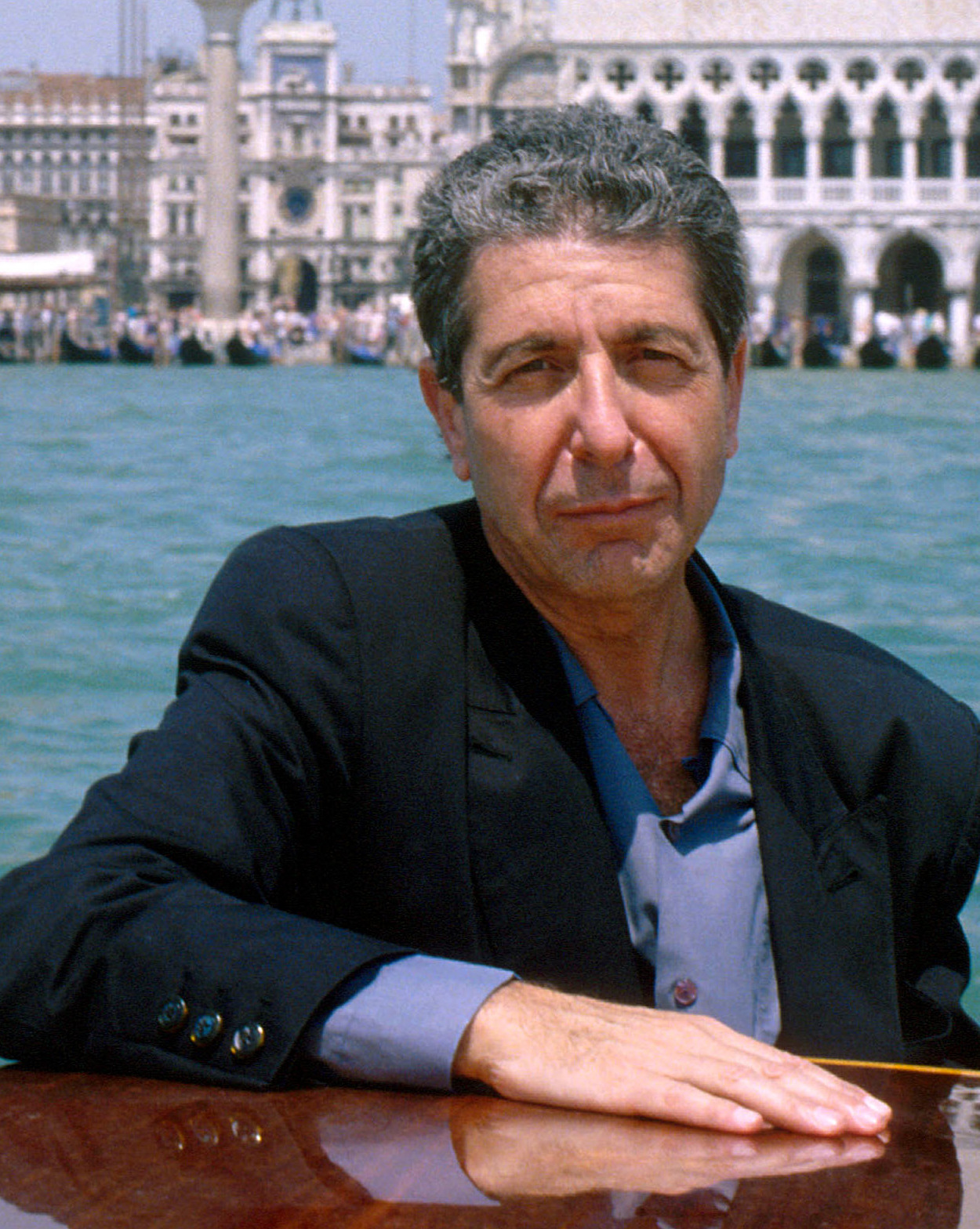
Leonard Cohen in 1988

Perla Batalla was born in Los Angeles c. 1964, to an Argentinian mother, Barbara, and a Mexican father, Jorge. Her mother was a singer, and her father was a mariachi musician. Her parents ran a record store called Discoteca Batalla in Los Angeles in the 1970s. Two years after graduating from high school, Batalla was granted a scholarship to attend the Lee Strasberg Theatre Institute. Meanwhile, she earned money from participating in talent contests at bars. Batalla told an interviewer from the Los Angeles Times in 2001 that she had been attending law school when she took a friend's advice to follow a career in music instead. She was introduced to Leonard Cohen by her friend Julie Christensen, when Cohen was auditioning for backup singers for his I'm Your Man tour. Batalla said in 2001 that meeting Cohen was her "big break and the opening of everything".

In 1988 and 1993, she toured as a backup singer with Cohen, who encouraged her to write her own songs. Reviewing a concert at the Royal Albert Hall in 1988, David Sinclair of The Times wrote that the effect of Batalla and Christensen was "exquisite" and "instrumental in shoring up many of the melodies against Cohen's lachrymose grunt". In the Guardian, Adam Sweeting referred to the pair as "exuberant vocal foils to put the skids under Cohen's worn-big-ends croak" in 1993. Batalla was a backing singer on Cohen's album The Future (1992) and appears on his Cohen Live (1994), which features live recordings from the 1988 and 1993 tours.

=== Albums ===
Jac Holzman signed Batalla to Discovery Records, which released her debut album, Perla Batalla, in 1994. The album includes songs written by Batalla, as well as covers, including "Sixteen Tons" and songs by Cohen and Van Morrison. A review in Billboard called it an "impassioned, at times sublime debut" and opined that although Batalla had "a tendency to lapse into one-dimensional writing, she makes up for this shortcoming on [some] profound originals". After Holzman left Discovery, Batalla parted with the company and founded her own music label, Mechuda Music. She released her second album, Mestiza (meaning of mixed blood), in 1998 on her own label and sold it via her website. Both CDs were co-written with David Batteau. Amazon named Mestiza Best Independent Release of the year. Heaven and Earth: the Mestiza Voyage followed in 2000, and was described by Mark Holston of Hispanic as a "collection of pensive, poetic themes developed at a leisurely pace" on which Batalla was "a mesmerizing vocalist who casts a lingering spell". Shortly after the release of the album, a review of a live performance by Batalla by Ernesto Lechner in the Los Angeles Times compared her to Joni Mitchell and Joan Baez, and suggested that she had been influenced by Fleetwood Mac's album Rumours. Lechner praised Batalla's performance, writing that her "music caresses with its harmonies and gentle rhythms, then draws you in with an unexpected chorus or an unusual melodic resolution", and describing her as "a born storyteller with a rambunctious sense of humor".

Her album Discoteca Batalla was recorded in 2002 as an homage to her parents' record shop of the same name. Discoteca Batalla was a compilation of new compositions interspersed with treatments of traditional Spanish language songs, which was praised by Holston, who wrote that Batalla's "dark amber-toned voice and unique approach to these classics make them new again". In 2004 Batalla was invited by the John F. Kennedy Center for the Performing Arts to perform songs from the album as artist in residence.

Batalla recorded a 2005 tribute album to Cohen, titled Bird on the Wire. Sing Out! magazine's Michael Tearson wrote: "Beautifully conceived and executed, Bird on the Wire is a rewarding listening experience I find myself returning to frequently. It is every bit the equal of Jennifer Warnes's classic Cohen tribute album 'Famous Blue Raincoat'. For those uninitiated to the glories of the songs of Leonard Cohen this is a wonderful introduction. For the rest of us it is simply heavenly." Christensen, Batalla's fellow backing singer on Cohen's 1988 and 1993 tours, contributed backing vocals on some of the album's tracks.

Her next release, Gracias a la Vida (2005), was an anthology of traditional South American songs inspired by a trip to meet her Argentine family. She performed "Hey Look Me Over" on tribute album The Best Is Yet to Come: The Songs of Cy Coleman (2009). In 2010, Batalla released a first collection of holiday songs titled We Three Kings. One of the album's songs, "Christmas Time Is Here", was chosen as KCRW's top tune for Christmas. In 2011, she was commissioned by the Los Angeles County Museum of Art to write and perform a piece to celebrate the opening of The Adventures of Women Surrealists in Mexico and the U.S. Batalla and her songwriting partner Batteau worked on building this into a full-length theatrical concert called "Blue House"; the song cycle was inspired by two painters, Frida Kahlo and Diego Rivera.

Batalla has also been a backing singer for k.d. lang, the Gipsy Kings and Iggy Pop.

=== Film and video ===
An edited version of Cohen's performance of his "Tower of Song" at The Prince's Trust Rock Gala in 1988, backed by Batalla and Christensen, was released on the video and DVD of the event. The trio also appear in the video for Cohen's "Closing Time" (from The Future). Batalla played a singer in the film You Know My Name (1999). She featured in Hal Willner's Cohen tribute concert film, Leonard Cohen: I'm Your Man (2005), performing "Bird on the Wire", "Suzanne" (with Nick Cave and Julie Christensen), and "Anthem" (with Christensen). Batalla arranged and directed comedic musical vocal scenes for Will Ferrell's Step Brothers. She has also been a vocal coach for Jeremy Piven of Entourage.

== Artistry ==
=== Voice ===
Batalla's voice type is contralto.

== Personal life ==
Batalla is married to chef and television personality Claud Mann, and they have a daughter.

== Discography ==
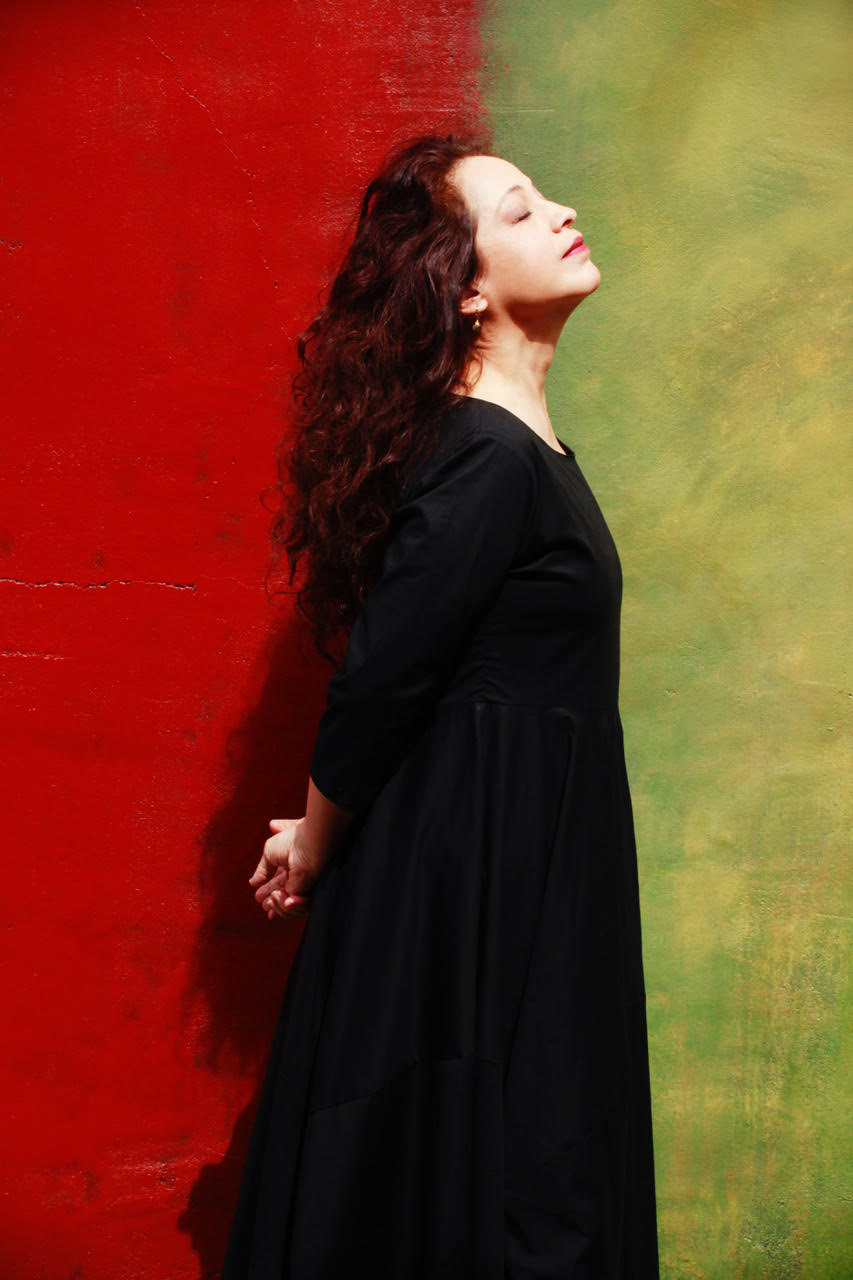
A promotional photograph of Batalla

Solo Albums

- Perla Batalla (1994)
- Mestiza (1998)
- Heaven and Earth: the Mestiza Voyage (2000)
- Discoteca Batalla (2002)
- Bird on the Wire: The Songs Of Leonard Cohen (2005)
- Gracias a la Vida (2005) (also known as What I Did on My Summer Vacation)
- We Three Kings (2008)
- Love is Everything (2014)
- A Letter to Leonard Cohen (2024)
