= Unetanneh Tokef =

Jewish liturgical poem

Berosh Hashana Yikatevun (from Unetane Tokef). Ashkenazi (Chasiddic) version. Performer: Yeshayahu Bik; Recorded by: Yaakov Mazor; In NSA Studio, 1997

recording by Cantor Jacob T.

Untanneh Tokef (Hebrew: וּנְתַנֶּה תּוֹקֶף, 'let us speak of the awesomeness [of the day]'), also spelled Unthanneh Toqeph, Un'taneh Tokef, or Unsanneh Tokef, is a piyyut that has been a part of the Rosh Hashanah and Yom Kippur liturgy in some traditions of Rabbinic Judaism for centuries. It introduces the Kedushah of the Mussaf services of the High Holy Days. In many communities, it is chanted while the Torah ark is open and the congregants are standing. It is the "central poem of the High Holy Day [of the Day of Atonement]", argued Herman Wouk. The ArtScroll machzor calls it "one of the most stirring compositions in the entire liturgy of the Days of Awe".

== Origin ==
=== Traditional account ===
The following story is recorded in the 13th-century halakhic work Or Zarua, which attributes it to Ephraim of Bonn (a compiler of Jewish martyrologies, died ca. 1200):

I found in a manuscript written by Rabbi Ephraim of Bonn that Rabbi Amnon of Mainz wrote Untanneh Tokef about the terrible event which befell him, and these are his words: "It happened to Rabbi Amnon of Mainz, who was the greatest of his generation, and rich, and pedigreed, and handsome, that the bishop and his officials began to ask him to convert to their faith, (Note: So the printings; MSS: "their error" or "their straying".) but he refused to listen to them. Thus they spoke to him day after day, but he did not listen to them, so the bishop became angry with him. When they arrested him, he said 'I wish to consult and to think upon this matter for three days.' Though he said this only to delay them, he was immediately consumed by guilt, for he had implied that he doubted the word of God and could be convinced to apostatize. He went home, but he could not eat nor drink, and he sickened. All his friends and family came to comfort him, but he would not be comforted, saying 'I will follow my words (Note: In some MSS: "this matter".) to a mournful death', and he wept and his heart was bitter. On the third day, as he sat in pain and worry, the bishop sent for him, but he said 'I will not go". The bishop sent numerous and distinguished messengers, but still he refused to go. Now the bishop ordered that he immediately be brought by force, and he was brought. He said to Amnon, 'Why did you not come to me at the time which you appointed, to answer me and fulfill my request?', and Amnon answered, "Let me be struck dumb, (Note: Alternately "Let me decide my own sentence", "I am my sentence".) for the tongue which lied to you deserves to be severed', wishing to sanctify the name of God because of what he had said. But the bishop said, 'I will not sever the tongue which has spoken so well, (Note: MS Parma 563: "I will sever the tongue just as you have said".) but I will cut off those legs which failed to bring you to me at the appointed time, and mutilate the rest of your body'. This villain cut off Amnon's fingers and toes, joint by joint, and after every cut he would ask, 'Will Amnon now convert to our faith?', but Amnon always replied 'No'. When at last this was complete, the evil bishop ordered that he be placed upon a shield, with his fingers and toes beside him, and carried home. Thus was he called 'Rabbi Amnon', for he believed (he'emin) in the Living God enough to suffer these terrible wounds for his faith, out of love, all because of the words which he had said.

When Rosh haShanah came around, Amnon asked his family to carry him to the synagogue with his preserved fingers and toes, and to place him next to the cantor, which they did. When the cantor reached Kedusha, Amnon said to him, 'Wait a moment, and I will sanctify the Great Name'. And he cried aloud, Uv'khen l'kha ta'aleh k'dusha, viz. 'I have sanctified your name for your majesty and unity'. And then he said Un'taneh tokef k'dushat hayyom, and he said Emet ki atah hu dayyan umochiakh, to justify the verdict. So he continued, saying V'chotem yad kol bo, to ask that his own hand be received before God, which had been severed for the sake of His unity. (Note: So Parma 563; in other MSS versions confused.) And vatifkod nefesh kol chai, for this had been decreed for him on Rosh haShana. So the whole poem [was a personal response to his experience]. When he had finished, he disappeared from this world right before their eyes. About him did the Psalmist say: 'Oh how great is thy goodness, which thou hast laid up for them that fear thee'.

Three days after Amnon was taken away to the Heavenly Academy, he appeared in a dream-vision to Rabbi Kalonymus ben Rabbi Meshullam ben Rabbi Kalonymus ben Rabbi Moses ben Rabbi Kalonymus, and taught him this poem, viz. Untaneh tokef k'dushat hayyom, and he told Rabbi Kalonymus to distribute it throughout the diaspora, to be for him a memorial and a legacy, and so he did".

The commentary on Unetanneh tokef given here is notably unrelated to that of MS Hamburg 17 (f. 113r) which was completed in 1317 and contains work attributed to Ephraim of Bonn. However, MS Hamburg titles the work "Silluq of Rabbi Amnon".

=== Modern scholarship ===
It was once speculated that Kalonymus is the true author of the poem. However, both the language and style are different from the other poems of Kalonymus. In addition, there is evidence that a very similar piyyut was being recited in Italy in contemporary with Kalonymus.

Since then, a copy of the poem was discovered in the Cairo Geniza, Fragment Cambridge T-S H8.6, originally dated by Eric Werner to the 8th century. Ben Outhwaite thought this date unrealistic considering the paper and script, instead dating it to the 11th century.

While medieval history testifies amply to the intense persecution of Jews by Christians at the time of the Crusades, there are difficulties with the legend that it was composed by Amnon. Not least of these is its portrayal of Amnon as an illustrious Torah giant, while Jewish history of that period provides no record of a 'Rav Amnon of Mainz' at all. It seems unlikely that a person of such tremendous stature would be remembered only in a single legend. The received story has all the qualities of an urban legend - a heroic rabbi of whom there is no disparaging or even tedious information, an extremely cruel gentile villain (also without the problem of additional biographic details), the esteemed name and endorsement of Kalonymus, miraculous or extraordinary events, and supernatural instructions to include the poem in the annual liturgy. Scholars have long known that there is no historical foundation for the story of Rabbi Amnon and that this story may have been inspired or derived from the Christian legend associated with Saint Emmeram of Regensburg. Moreover, the discovery of the Unetaneh Tokef prayer within the earliest strata of the Cairo Geniza materials, dating well before the 11th century, makes it almost impossible that the prayer could have been composed as the legend claims.

Additionally, some scholars see parallels with non-Jewish hymnology, suggesting that elements of the prayer stemmed from other sources. It is possible that the Rabbi Amnon story was entirely invented, not necessarily by the author of Or Zarua, to legitimize a piyyut of doubtful origin or simply to satisfy popular curiosity about the background of such an impressive liturgical work. Indications of this are the absence of evidence of the existence of a Rabbi Amnon, the fact that the name Amnon is a variant of the Hebrew word for "faithful", the extravagance of the story, the conspicuous inclusion of Kalonymus, and evidences that this piyyut or something very similar was already in use before the time ascribed.

Yaakov Spiegel has argued that the prayer was written by Yannai in the sixth century. Authorship from Israel is supported by internal evidence, such as the concluding three-part remedy of 'repentance, prayer, and charity', which is found in exact permutation in Genesis Rabbah (composed in the Land of Israel), yet not in Babylonian sources (e.g., Talmud Bavli cites a four-part remedy). Stylistically, the prayer indicates its composition in the land of Israel during the Byzantine period (namely 330–638).

== Position in the prayer service ==
In the Ashkenazi rite, Untanneh Tokef is inserted during the Mussaf, when the hazzan repeats the Amidah, as a silluk (parting poem) just before intoning the kedusha. In the Sephardic rite, Untanneh Tokef is usually omitted; however, some Sephardic congregations, mainly Moroccan, recite it immediately prior to the commencement of the Mussaf and some have the custom to recite it during the repetition on the first day. In many communities, the Torah ark is opened and the congregation stands up to chant it.

It is one of the few piyyutim that is recited on both days of Rosh Hashanah and on Yom Kippur in the Polish and Italian traditions, whereas it is only said on Rosh Hashanah by Sephardim and Western Ashkenazim, who have another silluk for Yom Kippur: "Mi Ya'arokh Eilekho". In Reform practice, it was taken from the recitation of the Amidah and presented as an independent item in both Mincha and Yizkor services. Early Reform practice had the line about the angels trembling deleted, but it has been restored in more recent Reform prayerbooks.

In the version of the Italian Rite practiced in Rome, a variant of Untanneh Tokef is recited in the Mussaf service for Hoshana Rabbah, Kabbalistically considered the official conclusion of the Days of Awe. In this variant, the line "and on Yom Kippur they are sealed" (וּבְיוֹם צוֹם כִּפּוּר יֵחָתֵמוּן) is replaced with "and on the day of Hoshana Rabbah they are sealed" (וּבְיוֹם הוֹשַׁעֲנָא רָבָּא יֵחָתֵמוּן).

== Themes and sources of Untanneh Tokef ==
Untanneh Tokef is recited immediately prior to and as an introduction for the kedusha prayer, during which the angelic sanctification of God is mentioned. Untanneh Tokef adapts this daily praise to the specific elements intrinsic to the High Holidays, namely the Divine judgment of all existence. In most printed editions, Untanneh Tokef consists of four paragraphs, each reflecting a different aspect of this general topic.

The theme of a divine decree being written derives, at least in part, to a Talmudic teaching:

On Rosh Hashana, three books are opened [in Heaven] – one for the thoroughly wicked, one for the thoroughly righteous, and one for those in-between. The thoroughly righteous are immediately inscribed clearly in the Book of Life. The thoroughly wicked are immediately inscribed clearly in the Book of Death. The fate of those in-between is postponed from Rosh Hashana until Yom Kippur, at which time those who are deserving are then inscribed in the Book of Life, those who are undeserving are then inscribed in the Book of Death.

As a token of this belief, the common greeting on Rosh Hashana is לשׁנה טוֹבה תּכּתב (Leshana tovah tikatev) – "May you be inscribed for a good year".

=== Fear and trembling ===
The first paragraph depicts the judgment day, where the angels in heaven tremble at the awe-inspiring event of the annual judgment of all creation, with the implication that man should also approach this day with trepidation. The heavenly Book of Chronicles is opened, in which every human being's fate will be inscribed.

Hebrew Text	Translation	Biblical/Rabbinical sources
וּנְתַנֶּה תֹּקֶף קְדֻשַּׁת הַיּוֹם כִּי הוּא נוֹרָא וְאָיוֹם וּבו תִנָּשֵׂא מַלְכוּתֶךָ וְיִכּון בְּחֶסֶד כִּסְאֶךָ וְתֵשֵׁב עָלָיו בֶּאֱמֶת. אֱמֶת כִּי אַתָּה הוּא דַיָּן וּמוֹכִיחַ וְיוֹדֵעַ וָעֵד וְכוֹתֵב וְחוֹתֵם וְסוֹפֵר וּמוֹנֶה. וְתִזְכֹּר כָּל הַנִּשְׁכָּחות, וְתִפְתַּח אֶת סֵפֶר הַזִּכְרוֹנוֹת. וּמֵאֵלָיו יִקָּרֵא. וְחוֹתָם יַד כָּל אָדָם בּו. וּבְשׁוֹפָר גָּדוֹל יִתָּקַע. וְקוֹל דְּמָמָה דַקָּה יִשָּׁמַע. וּמַלְאָכִים יֵחָפֵזוּן. וְחִיל וּרְעָדָה יֹאחֵזוּן. וְיֹאמְרוּ הִנֵּה יוֹם הַדִּין. לִפְקד עַל צְבָא מָרוֹם בַּדִּין. כִּי לֹא יִזְכּוּ בְעֵינֶיךָ בַּדִּין.	"Let us now relate the power of this day's holiness, for it is mighty and frightening. On it Your Kingship will be exalted; Your throne will be firmed with kindness and You will sit upon it in truth. It is true that You alone are the One Who judges, proves, knows, and bears witness; Who writes and seals, Who counts and Who calculates. You will remember all that was forgotten. You will open the Book of Remembrances — it will read itself – and each person's signature is there. And the great shofar will be sounded and a still, thin voice will be heard. Angels will be frenzied, a trembling and terror will seize them — and they will say, 'Behold, it is the Day of Judgment, to muster the heavenly host for judgment!' — for even they are not guiltless in Your eyes in judgment."	Book of fate: Deuteronomy 29:19, Zechariah 5:3, Malachi 3:16, Psalms 69:28, Daniel 12:1: "Rav Kruspedai said in the name of Rav Yochanan: Three books are opened on Rosh Hashanah, one for the confirmed unrighteous, one for the confirmed righteous, and one for intermediate individuals. The confirmed righteous are signed and sealed immediately for life; the confirmed unrighteous are signed and sealed immediately for death; The fate of the intermediates is held suspended from Rosh Hashanah until Yom Kippur. If they are judged meritorious, they are written for life; if they are not judged meritorious, they are written for death." (Rosh Hashana 16b); "Reflect on three things, and you will not fall into transgression: know what is above you—a seeing eye, a hearing ear, and a book in which all your deeds are written." (Pirkei Avot 2:1); The great shofar will be sounded: Isaiah 27:13 The still thin sound: 1 Kings 19:11, Job 4:16: from a 2014 interview with Jonathan Sacks, former Chief Rabbi of the U.K.: "There's a wonderful line in Unetana Tokef: 'A great shofar sounds, and a still small voice is heard.' Here is God Himself, blowing the shofar. He doesn't scream in your ears; it's a still small voice. And then it says, 'The angels tremble.' That still small voice is what terrifies the angels. Not the big noise. But if God whispers in your ear and tells you you're an angel, that's terrifying. You think to yourself, 'Wow, I could be that big and look how small I am.'"; Guilt of angels: Job 25:5, Isaiah 24:21, Job 4:18, Job 15:15

=== God judges us ===
The second paragraph continues this point, depicting how every event that will occur in the upcoming year is "written on Rosh Hashanah and sealed on Yom Kippur". This paragraph is known by its opening words, BeRosh Hashana, and it is traditional that the litany of possible destinies is read with increasing speed from the phrase "Who shall rest and who shall wander" to the end of the paragraph.

This paragraph reaches its climax with the final line, said by all the congregants in unison, "But repentance, prayer, and righteousness avert the severe decree". This verse expresses the formula by which a man may obtain a reduction in the severity of the original decree, as expressed in the Bible (2 Chronicles 7:14), the Talmud (T.B., Rosh Hashana 16b; T.J. Ta'anit 2:1) and Midrash (Bereshit Rabba 44:13). A Talmudic reference (Jerusalem Talmud, Taanit 2) has the sequence as prayer, charity, and repentance; and a prayer book from Salonika in Ottoman Greece, handwritten in 1522, has this verse rearranged to conform to the Talmudic sequence. Interpreters disagree on whether to translate this line as "annul the severe decree" or as "annul the severity of the decree". This distinction because the phrasing is ambiguous – and it would seem that the decree itself – namely, death in some form – cannot be totally and permanently avoided but that the immediacy or the cruelty of that death might be mitigated.

This line is usually printed in emphatic typeface. Usually, in smaller type, the words "fasting", "voice", and "money" appear above "repentance", "prayer", and "righteousness" respectively – those words are not read aloud but are intended as instructions on how to perform the three acts necessary to avoid (or reduce) the dire punishments. Additionally, in gematria each of the three words in small type have a value of 136, which is interpreted as meaning that each is equally important in averting stern judgment. Moreover, the words are each an acronym: צום (fasting) is an acronym צעקה ושנוי מעשה ("cry out and change your ways"), קול (voice) represents קדושה וטהר לבנו ("become more holy and purify our hearts"), and ממון (money) is an acronym for מוציא מחברו וגם נותן ("encourage others to give and oneself to give").

Hebrew Text	Translation	Biblical/Rabbinical Sources
וְכָל בָּאֵי עוֹלָם יַעַבְרוּן (תעביר) לְפָנֶיךָ כִּבְנֵי מָרוֹן. כְּבַקָּרַת רוֹעֶה עֶדְרוֹ. מַעֲבִיר צאנוֹ תַּחַת שִׁבְטוֹ .כֵּן תַּעֲבִיר וְתִסְפֹּר וְתִמְנֶה וְתִפְקֹד נֶפֶשׁ כָּל חָי. וְתַחְתּךְ קִצְבָה לְכָל בְּרִיּוֹתֶיךָ (בריה). וְתִכְתֹּב אֶת גְּזַר דִּינָם: בְּראֹשׁ הַשָּׁנָה יִכָּתֵבוּן וּבְיוֹם צוֹם כִּפּוּר יֵחָתֵמוּן כַּמָּה יַעַבְרוּן וְכַמָּה יִבָּרֵאוּן מִי יִחְיֶה וּמִי יָמוּת. מִי בְקִצּוֹ וּמִי לא בְקִצּוֹ. מִי בַמַּיִם וּמִי בָאֵשׁ. מִי בַחֶרֶב וּמִי בַחַיָּה. מִי בָרָעָב וּמִי בַצָּמָא. מִי בָרַעַשׁ וּמִי בַמַּגֵּפָה. מִי בַחֲנִיקָה וּמִי בַסְּקִילָה. מִי יָנוּחַ וּמִי יָנוּעַ. מִי יִשָּׁקֵט וּמִי יִטָּרֵף. מִי יִשָּׁלֵו וּמִי יִתְיַסָּר. מִי יֵעָנִי וּמִי יֵעָשֵׁר. מִי יִשָּׁפֵל וּמִי יָרוּם. וּתְשׁוּבָה וּתְפִלָּה וּצְדָקָה מַעֲבִירִין אֶת רעַ הַגְּזֵרָה	"All mankind will pass before You like a flock of sheep. Like a shepherd pasturing his flock, making sheep pass under his staff, so shall You cause to pass, count, calculate, and consider the soul of all the living; and You shall apportion the destinies of all Your creatures and inscribe their verdict. On Rosh Hashanah will be inscribed and on Yom Kippur will be sealed – how many will pass from the earth and how many will be created; who will live and who will die; who will die at his time and who before his time; who by water and who by fire, who by sword and who by beast, who by famine and who by thirst, who by upheaval and who by plague, who by strangling and who by stoning. Who will rest and who will wander, who will live in quietude and who will be tormented, who will enjoy tranquility and who will be distressed, who will be impoverished and who will be enriched, who will be degraded and who will be exalted. (Note: In MSS each phrase begins with the positive and ends with the negative. In printings, the last phrase or the two last phrases are reversed so as to end on a positive note.) But Repentance, Prayer, and Charity mitigate the severity of the Decree."	Like a shepherd: Ezekiel 34:12, Isaiah 40:11 God scrutinizes man: Psalms 33:13, Psalms 8:5, Psalms 144:3, Job 7:17, Job 14:3: "On Rosh Hashana all worldly creatures pass before Him like the children of Maron [meaning, according to Gemara, 'in single-file,' like sheep being counted, hikers ascending a mountain pass, or troops passing muster] as it says, 'He who fashions the hearts of them all, who discerns all their doings.'" (Babylonian Talmud, Rosh Hashana 16a; see also Mishna, Rosh Hashanah 1:2); Repentance, prayer, and charity annul the severity of the decree: "R. Judah said in R. Eleazar's name: Three things nullify a decree, and these are they: Prayer and charity (or righteousness) and repentance..." (Genesis Rabbah 44:12).

=== We are helpless ===
The third paragraph begs for Divine mercy on the basis of the fact that man by nature is sinful and innately impotent and mortal, which conditions will cause a merciful Deity to forgive his trespasses. The passage here echoes the despair found in the book of Koheleth (Ecclesiastes), but concludes - as does Isaiah 40:8, from which it apparently draws - with the contrasting affirmation that God is eternal and enduring. The text of אדם יסודו מעפר ("A man's origin is from dust") is very similar to Wisdom of Solomon 2:1, where it is presented as the philosophy which the Book of Wisdom sets out to discredit.

Hebrew Text	Translation	Biblical/Rabbinical Sources
כִּי כְּשִׁמְךָ כֵּן תְּהִלָּתֶךָ קָשֶׁה לִכְעֹס וְנוחַ לִרְצות כִּי לֹא תַחְפּץ בְּמוֹת הַמֵּת כִּי אִם בְּשׁוּבו מִדַּרְכּוֹ וְחָיָה וְעַד יוֹם מוֹתוֹ תְּחַכֶּה לּוֹ אִם יָשׁוּב מִיַּד תְּקַבְּלוֹ. אֱמֶת כִּי אַתָּה הוּא יוֹצְרָם וְ[אַתָּה] יוֹדֵעַ יִצְרָם כִּי הֵם בָּשָׂר וָדָם. אָדָם יְסוֹדוֹ מֵעָפָר, וְסוֹפוֹ לֶעָפָר בְּנַפְשׁוֹ יָבִיא לַחְמוֹ מָשׁוּל כְּחֶרֶס הַנִּשְׁבָּר כְּחָצִיר יָבֵשׁ וּכְצִיץ נוֹבֵל כְּצֵל עוֹבֵר וּכְעָנָן כָּלָה וּכְרוּחַ נוֹשָׁבֶת וּכְאָבָק פּוֹרֵחַ וְכַחֲלוֹם יָעוּף.	"For Your Name signifies Your praise: hard to anger and easy to appease, for You do not wish the death of one deserving death, but that he repent from his way and live. Until the day of his death You await him; if he repents You will accept him immediately. It is true that You are their Creator and You know their inclination, for they are flesh and blood. A man's origin is from dust and his destiny is back to dust, at risk of his life he earns his bread; he is likened to a broken shard, withering grass, a fading flower, a passing shade, a dissipating cloud, a blowing wind, flying dust, and a fleeting dream."	If a man repents, God accepts: Isaiah 55:7, Ezekiel 18:23, Proverbs 28:13, 2 Chronicles 7:14 God knows man's inclination: Man is but flesh and blood: Genesis 3:19, Isaiah 40:7, 40:23, Psalms 90:3, Psalms 144:4, Job 7:1, Job 14:1, Ecclesiastes 6:12, Ecclesiastes 12:7; see also Wisdom of Solomon 2:1

=== God is enduring ===
Finally, the fourth paragraph lyrically praises God as exalted above all existence, and begs Him to sanctify His Name by redeeming Israel – transitioning directly into the kedusha:

Hebrew Text	Translation	Biblical/Rabbinical Sources
וְאַתָּה הוּא מֶלֶךְ אֵל חַי וְקַיָּם אֵין קִצְבָה לִשְׁנוֹתֶיךָ. וְאֵין קֵץ לְאֹרֶךְ יָמֶיךָ וְאֵין לְשַׁעֵר מַרְכְּבוֹת כְּבוֹדֶךָ. וְאֵין לְפָרֵשׁ עֵלוּם שְׁמֶך שִׁמְךָ נָאֶה לְךָ. וְאַתָּה נָאֶה לִשְׁמֶךָ. וּשְׁמֵנוּ קָרָאתָ בִּשְׁמֶךָ.	"But You are the King, the Living and Enduring God. There is no set span to Your years and there is no end to the length of Your days. It is impossible to estimate the angelic chariots of Your glory and it is forbidden to pronounce Your Name. Your Name is worthy of You and You are worthy of Your Name, and You have included Your Name in our name."	God enduring: Psalms 145:13 You have included Your Name in our name: The name Israel (ישראל) contains within it El (אל), one of the names of God. Rashi on Numbers 26:5

== Popular culture ==
- Leonard Cohen's song "Who by Fire" (from the 1974 album New Skin for the Old Ceremony) was inspired by this poem.
- The 1982 documentary Who Shall Live and Who Shall Die? takes its title from the prayer's text.
- In 1990, Israeli composer Yair Rosenblum composed a new musical setting for the prayer. This version was first performed at a memorial for 11 soldiers from kibbutz Beit Hashita who fell during the 1973 Yom Kippur war, and is now often played on Israeli radio during the High Holy Days.

== Resources ==
- Orthodox Union site with background
- Video of Cantor Simon Cohen in concert recital of second paragraph, YouTube
- Rabbi Eliezer Melamed, The Story of the "Unetaneh Tokef" Prayer
- Prof. R. Katzoff, הדף השבועי ליום כפור, Bar- Ilan University. [in Hebrew]. רנון קצוף - ונתנה תוקף
