= Take This Waltz (song) =

Single by Leonard Cohen

from the album I'm Your Man
- Released: 1986
- Recorded: Studios Montmartre, Paris
- Genre: Baroque pop
- Length: 5:59
- Label: Columbia
- Songwriters: Leonard Cohen; Federico García Lorca
- Producers: Jean-Michel Reusser; Leonard Cohen

Leonard Cohen singles chronology
"Take This Waltz" (1986)	"First We Take Manhattan" (1988)

"Take This Waltz" is a song by Canadian singer-songwriter Leonard Cohen, originally released as part of the 1986 Federico García Lorca tribute album Poets in New York and as a single.

The song was later included in Cohen's 1988 studio album I'm Your Man, in a slightly re-arranged version (with addition of violin and Jennifer Warnes's duet vocals, both absent from the 1986 version).

The song's lyrics are a loose translation, into English, of the poem "Pequeño vals vienés" (Little Viennese Waltz) by the Spanish poet Federico García Lorca (one of Cohen's favorite poets). The poem was first published in Lorca's seminal book Poeta en Nueva York.

== Covers ==
Actor/singer Sven Wollter recorded a version of the song with lyrics translated into Swedish on his 1989 album Nån sorts man. The title of the song is "Tag min vals" ("Take My Waltz").

Zorán Sztevanovity covered the song in 1991 with Cohen's original music but with different lyrics in Hungarian language written by his brother Dusán. The title of the song is "Volt egy tánc" ("There Was a Dance").

Enrique Morente and Lagartija Nick covered the song in 1996 with Cohen's music and Lorca's original verse on the album Omega. Two years later, Spanish singer Ana Belén covered the song in Spanish ("Pequeño Vals Vienés") for her album Lorquiana. In 2014, Sílvia Pérez Cruz and Raül Fernandez Miró covered the song in Spanish for their Album Granada. The Spanish version is also included in the 2015 film La Novia (The Bride), based on Lorca's tragedy Blood Wedding.

The film Take This Waltz directed by Sarah Polley takes its name from the song which was also featured prominently in the movie.

Croatian singer Ibrica Jusić recorded this song as Mali Bečki Valcer on his 1999. L. Cohen-tribute-album named Hazarder.

The Canadian singer Patricia O'Callaghan performs the song on her 2001 album Real Emotional Girl.

Swedish Singer Ebba Forsberg covered the song in 2009 on her Leonard Cohen tribute album Ta Min Vals.

Adam Cohen covered the song on the 2009 Leonard Cohen tribute album Acordes Con Leonard Cohen.

Sílvia Pérez Cruz and Andrés Herrera 'El Pájaro' covered the song with the original poem in Spanish in 2017.

Crissi Cochrane included a cover of the song performed live in concert with a chamber music ensemble on her EP Fire Sign in 2026.
