= Georges Chelon =

French singer and songwriter

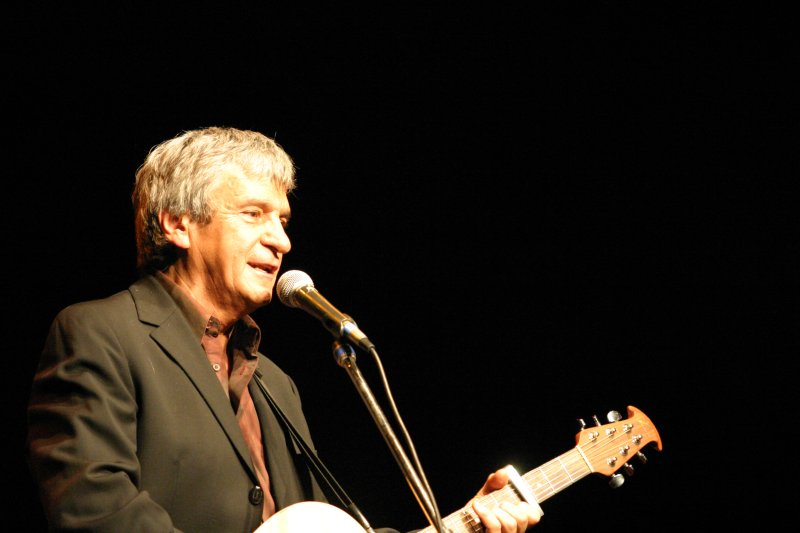
Chelon in December 2006

Georges Chelon (born 4 January 1943) is a French singer and songwriter. He was made a member of the Ordre des Arts et des Lettres in 1985.

== Discography ==
- 1965 Père prodigue
- 1965 15-20 et plus...
- 1966 La bourse des chansons N°15
- 1967 Bobino 67
- 1967 La bourse des chansons N°16, N°17, N°18
- 1968 15-20 et plus...
- 1968 Tu sais
- 1968 Sampa
- 1969 Chelon 69
- 1970 Vengeance
- 1971 Olympia 71
- 1972 Soirée avec
- 1973 Ouvrez les portes de la vie
- 1975 Si demain
- 1975 Père prodigue
- 1976 Faits divers
- 1977 Commencer à revivre
- 1977 Sampa, Parole, Evelyne
- 1979 Tous les deux comme hier
- 1982 Orange et citron
- 1982 Père prodigue
- 1983 Poète en l'an 2000
- 1986 Père prodigue
- 1987 Petit enfant de l'univers
- 1989 Poète en l'an 2000
- 1989 L'enfant du Liban
- 1990 Chercheurs d'eau
- 1990 Père prodigue
- 1991 2000 c'est demain
- 1991 Georges Chelon chante la Seine
- 1991 Georges Chelon en public
- 1994 L'air de rien
- 1995 Le cosmonaute
- 1997 Ballades en solitaire
- 1997 Ma compilation
- 1997 Ouvrez les portes de la vie
- 1998 On rêve, on rêve
- 1998 Morte saison
- 1999 Père prodigue
- 2000 Les portes de l'enfer
- 2000 L'enfant du Liban / Chercheurs d'eau
- 2000 Petit enfant de l'univers / Le grand dadais
- 2000 2000 c'est demain / L'air de rien
- 2000 Georges Chelon
- 2001 Père prodigue
- 2001 Morte saison
- 2002 Lettres ouvertes
- 2003 La Salopette
- 2003 Georges Chelon chante la Seine
- 2003 Chansons à part...
- 2004 Suppose que...
- 2004 Georges Chelon chante Les Fleurs du Mal / Charles Baudelaire / Volume 1
- 2005 L'impasse
- 2006 Georges Chelon chante Les Fleurs du Mal / Charles Baudelaire / Volume 2
- 2008 Olympia 2008 (Parution en double CD et en DVD)
- 2008 Georges Chelon chante Les Fleurs du Mal / Charles Baudelaire / Volume 3
- 2009 Georges Chelon chante Les Fleurs du Mal / Charles Baudelaire / Complete 7 CD
- 2010 Mes préférences
- 2011 C'est passé vite
