= New Skin for the Old Ceremony =

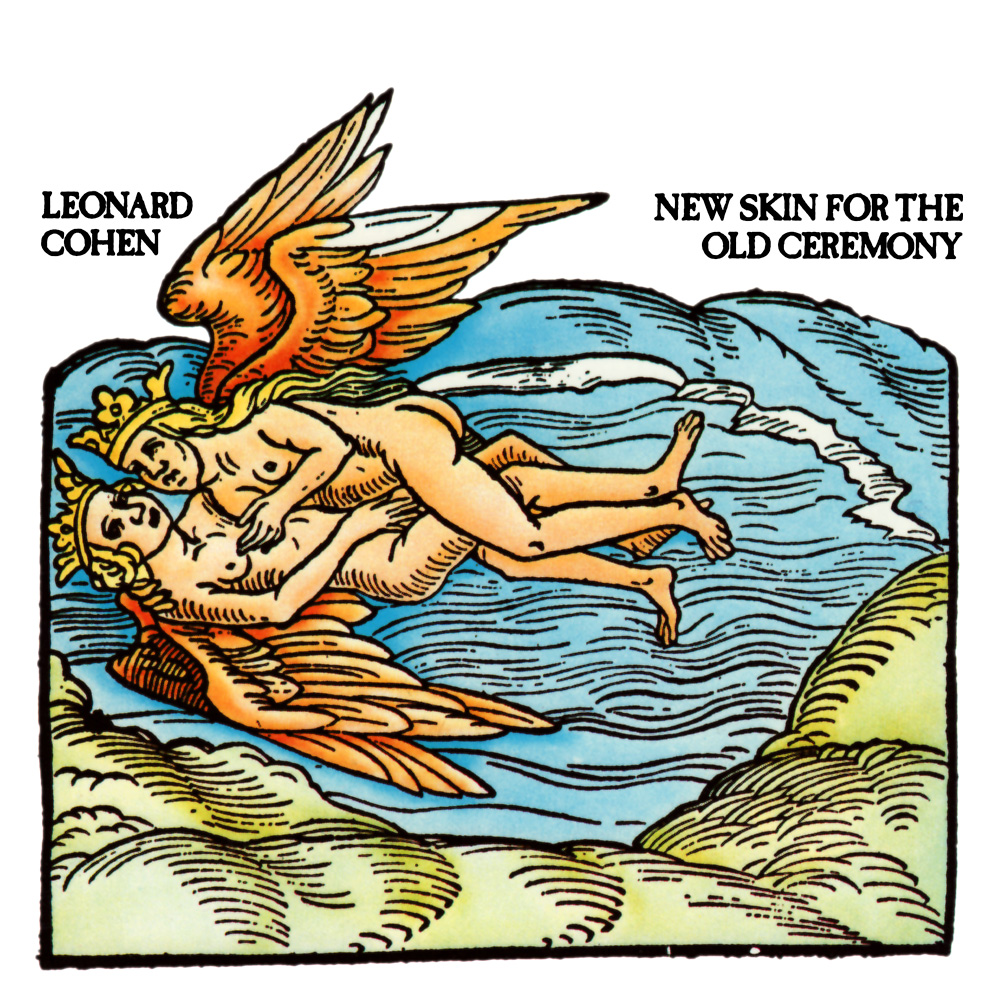

Studio album by Leonard Cohen
- Released: August 30, 1974
- Recorded: February 1974
- Studios: Sound Ideas Studio, New York
- Genre: Folk rock
- Length: 37:11
- Label: Columbia
- Producers: Leonard Cohen; John Lissauer

Leonard Cohen chronology
Live Songs (1973)	New Skin for the Old Ceremony (1974)	Death of a Ladies' Man (1977)

Singles from New Skin for the Old Ceremony
- 1. "Lover Lover Lover" Released: November 1974

Censored cover
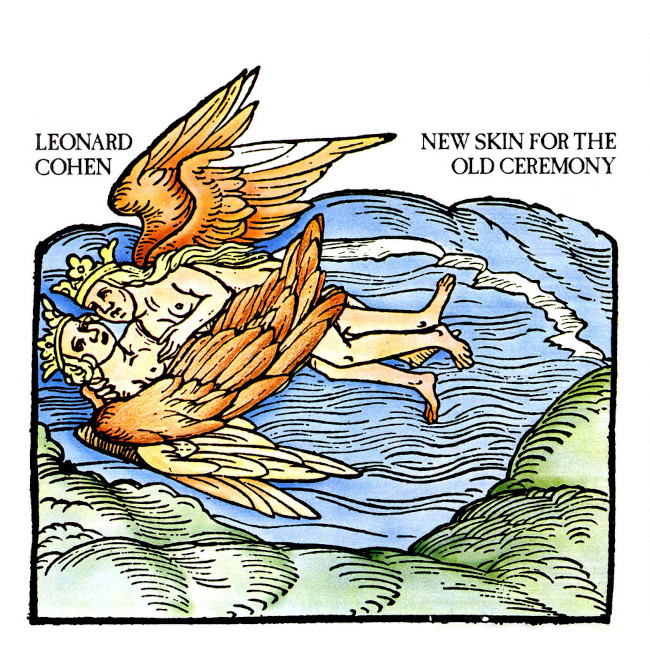

Professional ratings
Review scores
Source	Rating
AllMusic	4/5 stars
Robert Christgau	A−
Rolling Stone	(mixed)
Uncut	3/5 stars

New Skin for the Old Ceremony is the fourth studio album by Canadian singer-songwriter Leonard Cohen. On this album, he begins to evolve away from the rawer sound of his earlier albums, with violas, mandolins, banjos, guitars, percussion, and other instruments giving the album a more orchestrated (but nevertheless spare) sound. The album went silver in the UK, but never entered the Billboard Top 200 in the United States.

A remastered CD was released in 1995, and in 2009 it was included in Hallelujah – The Essential Leonard Cohen Album Collection, an 8-CD box set issued by Sony Music in the Netherlands.

== Cover ==
The original cover art for New Skin for the Old Ceremony was an image from the alchemical text Rosarium philosophorum. The two winged and crowned beings in sexual embrace caused his U.S. record label, Columbia Records, to print one early edition of the album minus the image substituting instead a photo of Cohen. Another early manifestation of the cover art saw an additional angel wing collage added to cover the depicted figures, presumably to render the image more "decent".

The image originally came to public attention in C. G. Jung's essay The Psychology of the Transference, where it is held by Jung to depict the union of psychic opposites in the consciousness of the enlightened saint. The sexual embrace as a symbol for this condition of psychic unity is also found frequently in Tibetan thangkas (sacred paintings).

== Songs ==
"Chelsea Hotel #2" refers to a sexual encounter in the Chelsea Hotel. For some years, when performing this song live, Cohen would tell a story that made it clear that the person about whom he was singing was Janis Joplin. Cohen would eventually come to regret his choice to make people aware that the song was about Joplin, and the graphic detail in which the song describes their brief relationship. In a 1994 broadcast on the BBC, Cohen said it was "an indiscretion for which I'm very sorry, and if there is some way of apologising to the ghost, I want to apologise now, for having committed that indiscretion."

In concert, a prolonged "I Tried to Leave You" was sometimes used to introduce the band. The 14-minute rendition from the 1985 Montreux Jazz Festival even featured extra lines given to the backup singers.

"Who by Fire" explicitly relates to Cohen's Jewish roots, echoing the words of the Unetanneh Tokef prayer and sung as a duet with Janis Ian (also Jewish; her birth name is Janis Eddy Fink). The song was written after Cohen's improvised concerts for Israeli soldiers in Sinai during the Yom Kippur War.

"Leaving Green Sleeves" is a reworking of the 16th-century folk song "Greensleeves". Cohen retains the chord progression and the words of the first two verses, but changes the melody and takes the latter verses in a different direction than the original. The song, and in turn the album, ends with Cohen violently screaming the chorus as the track fades out.

On December 16, 2010, the Hammer Museum in Los Angeles showcased a series of eleven commissioned art videos inspired by songs from New Skin for the Old Ceremony. The project was curated by Lorca Cohen and Darin Klein. The artists participating in the project were Brent Green, Alex da Corte, Wenston Currie, Theo Angell, Christian Holstad, Sylvan and Lily Lanken, "Lucky Dragons," Kelly Sears, Brett Milspaw, Peter Coffin, and Tina Tyrell. On April 14, 2011, the program screened at the Museum of Modern Art in New York.

== Track listing ==
All songs written by Leonard Cohen

Side one
No.	Title	Length
1.	"Is This What You Wanted"	4:12
2.	"Chelsea Hotel #2"	3:04
3.	"Lover Lover Lover"	3:18
4.	"Field Commander Cohen"	4:04
5.	"Why Don't You Try"	3:50

Side two
No.	Title	Length
6.	"There Is a War"	2:58
7.	"A Singer Must Die"	3:16
8.	"I Tried to Leave You"	2:36
9.	"Who by Fire"	2:32
10.	"Take This Longing"	4:04
11.	"Leaving Green Sleeves"	2:39

== Personnel ==
- Leonard Cohen – guitar, Jew's harp, vocals, producer
- Ralph Gibson – guitar
- Jeff Layton – banjo, mandolin, guitar, trumpet
- John Miller – bass
- Don Payne – bass
- Lewis Furey – viola
- John Lissauer – woodwinds, keyboards, backing vocals, producer, arranger
- Gerald Chamberlain – trombones
- Janis Ian – vocals
- Emily Bindiger – backing vocals
- Erin Dickins – backing vocals
- Gail Kantor – backing vocals
- Steve Gadd, Billy Cobham, Phil Collins, Vinnie Colaiuta – drums
- Armen Halburian – percussion

== Songs for Rebecca ==
Shortly after this album, co-producers Lissauer and Cohen proceeded to work on its follow-up, Songs For Rebecca, which was abandoned after one side was completed. Five songs are known from their live performances during the North American tour of November 1975; they were reworked and recorded few years later – two of them with Phil Spector for Death of a Ladies' Man in 1977, and the other three on Recent Songs in 1979.

== Cover versions ==
PJ Harvey covered "Who by Fire" in the opening credits of the 2022 Apple TV+ series Bad Sisters.

Coil covered "Who by Fire" on their 1986 album Horse Rotorvator.

"Lover Lover Lover" was covered by Ian McCulloch of Echo and the Bunnymen, scoring him a minor hit in the British charts in 1992.

"Is This What You Wanted" was covered by The Last Shadow Puppets for their 2016 EP The Dream Synopsis.

Buck 65 recorded "Who by Fire" as a duet with Jenn Grant as part of his 20 Odd Years project in 2010.

Spanish folk singer Joaquín Sabina covered "There is a War" (Spanish title: "Pie de Guerra") in his 2005 album Alivio de Luto, with translated lyrics.

== Charts ==
=== Weekly charts ===
Chart (1974–75)	Peak position
Australian Albums (Kent Music Report)	86
Austrian Albums (Ö3 Austria)	2
Dutch Albums (Album Top 100)	18
German Albums (Offizielle Top 100)	12
UK Albums (Official Charts)	24

Chart (2025)	Peak position
Greek Albums (IFPI)	63

=== Year-end charts ===
Chart (1975)	Position
German Albums (Offizielle Top 100)	46

== Certifications and sales ==
Region	Certification	Certified units/sales
United Kingdom (BPI)	Silver	60,000^{^}
Summaries
Europe	—	250,000
^{^} Shipments figures based on certification alone.
