= Anjani =

American musician (born 1959)

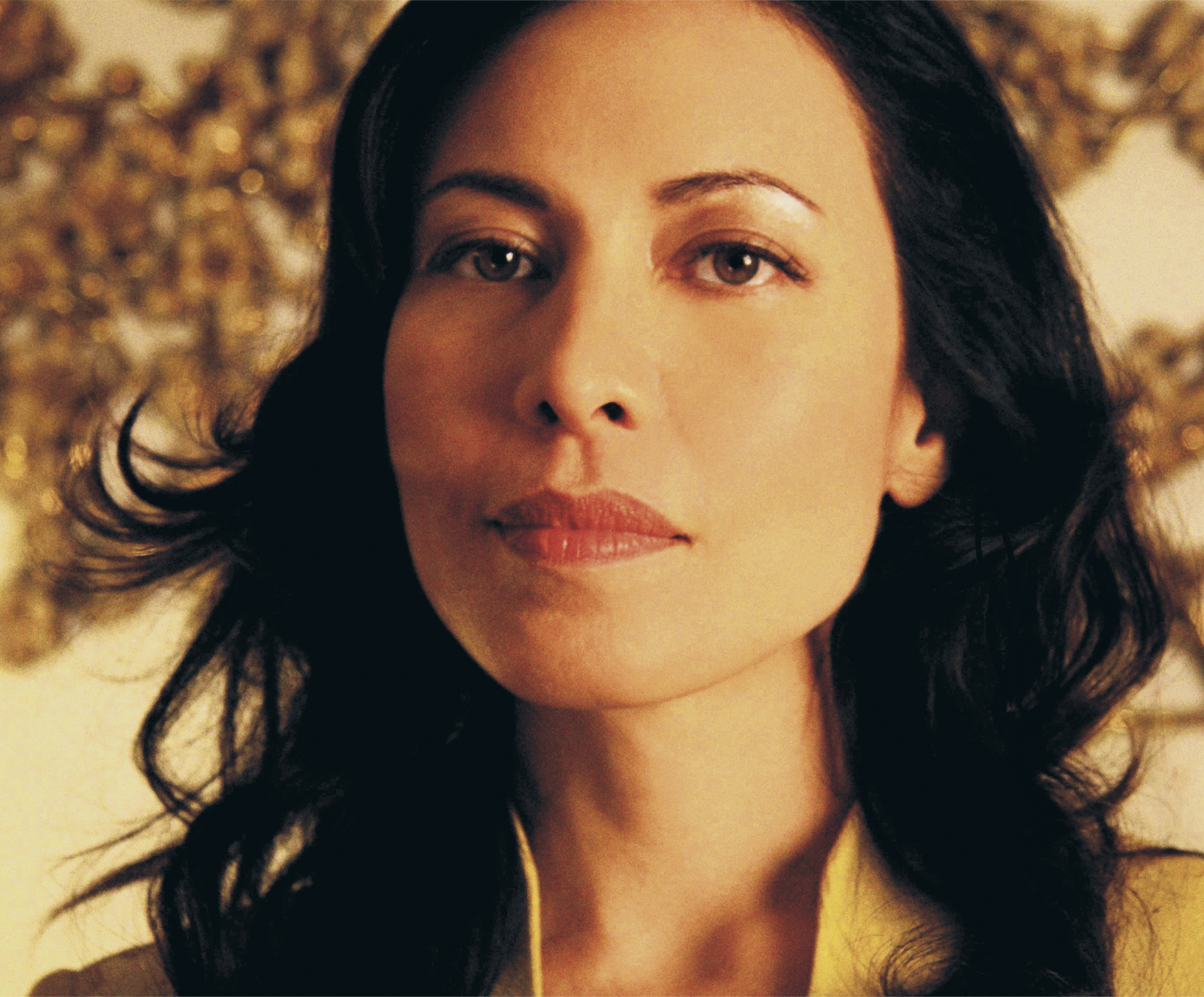
- Anjani in 1989

Background information
- Born: Anjani Thomas; July 10, 1959 (age 67); Honolulu, Territory of Hawaii, U.S.
- Genres: Jazz; folk
- Occupations: Musician; singer-songwriter
- Instruments: Vocals; piano
- Years active: 1983–present
- Label: Columbia
- Website: anjani-music.com

Anjani Thomas (born July 10, 1959) is an American singer-songwriter and pianist, best known for her work with singer-songwriter Leonard Cohen, as well as Carl Anderson, Frank Gambale, and Stanley Clarke. She became a solo artist in 2000.

== Life ==
Anjani was born in Honolulu, Hawaii, where she trained in guitar, piano and voice. She attended Berklee College of Music for a year then moved to New York City to a pursue a music career. She performed in jazz clubs before meeting producer John Lissauer, who hired her to provide backup vocals on Leonard Cohen's influential song "Hallelujah" from Various Positions. Anjani went on to tour with Cohen in 1985, as his keyboardist and backup vocalist, and worked with Cohen for many years after, lending her talents to I'm Your Man, The Future, Dear Heather and Old Ideas.

Anjani launched a solo career with Anjani in 2000 followed by The Sacred Names in 2001 – an ode to the Aramaic, Greek and Hebrew names of God. In 2006, Cohen contributed lyrics and production talents to Anjani's music and arrangements for Blue Alert on Columbia Records. The song "Blue Alert" was used in a 2007 Old Navy TV spot.

In 2011, Anjani began working on a follow-up to Blue Alert, which continued the collaboration with Leonard Cohen on three new songs. The new record, I Came to Love, was released in download-only form in July 2014.

== Discography ==
- Anjani (Little Fountain Music, 2000)
- The Sacred Names (Little Fountain Music, 2001)
- Blue Alert (Columbia, 2006)
- I Came to Love (2014)
