= John Lissauer =

American musician and actor

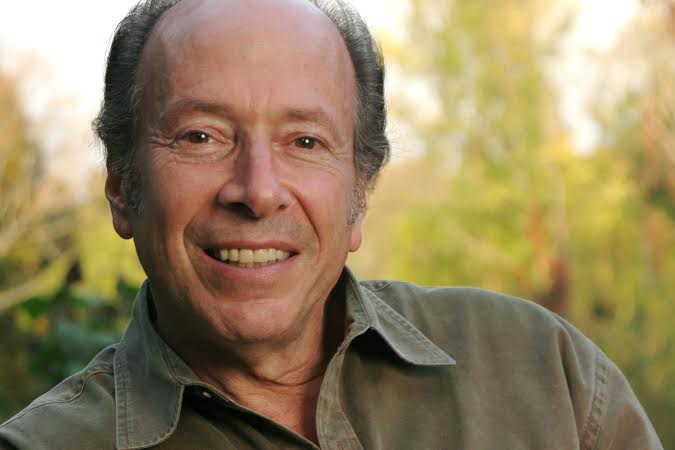

Background information
- Born: Summit, New Jersey, U.S.
- Occupations: Composer, producer, performer
- Website: www.johnlissauer.com

John Lissauer is an American composer, producer, and performer. At the age of 19, he arranged the first recordings of Al Jarreau. Lissauer went on to produce and arrange a pair of Leonard Cohen albums, including the song "Hallelujah" which was inducted into the Grammy Hall of Fame in 2019. He has been a composer or music producer for record albums, films, and radio and TV commercials. Lissauer received a Clio "Campaign of the Decade" award for his work for Polaroid.

== Early life and education ==
Lissauer was raised in Hauppauge, New York. From age 11 until he graduated from Yale College, Lissauer studied with Joseph Allard at the Juilliard School. Lissauer attended Yale University and graduated with honors in music.

== Career ==
Lissauer plays piano, flute, oboe, clarinet, bassoon, and saxophone. He began arranging music for Al Jarreau while still at Yale. He taught at Yale for a year, and then became a session piano player.

As a composer and music producer, he has worked with Al Jarreau, Bette Midler, Whitney Houston, and Luther Vandross.

In Canada to produce a record for Lewis Furey, Lissauer was approached by Cohen at a Furey concert. The two met again several weeks later in New York to produce the New Skin for the Old Ceremony album. John Miller, who played bass on the album, described Lissauer's approach to music as "very particular, European, simple but complex, highly imaginative". New Skin for the Old Ceremony would make the Top Thirty in the United Kingdom.

After the album was completed, Cohen appointed Lissauer as the musical director for his next two tours; Lissauer played piano, organ, saxophone, and percussion on the tours.

In 1983, Lissauer again worked with Cohen to produce the album Various Positions, including the arrangement of "Hallelujah", which would go on to become one of the most recorded songs of its time. Disappointed when Columbia Records decided against a U.S. release of the album, Lissauer decided to focus his efforts on composing for films and TV. (Note: Various Positions was released a year later by an independent label.)

Although he had given up record producing, in 2006 Lissauer arranged several songs on Blue Alert by Anjani as a favor for Cohen.

In 2022, Lissauer appeared in the documentary Hallelujah: Leonard Cohen, A Journey, A Song, and composed the score.

== Personal life ==
Lissauer was married to Erin Dickins, with whom he restored an overgrown 35-acre property an hour north of New York City that had been owned previously by composer Frederick Loewe. In 1984, he married Lilian, with whom he had one son.

== Select composer/production discography ==
Artist	Release	Label	Credit
Leonard Cohen	Various Positions	Columbia	Producer/Arranger/Performer
Leonard Cohen	New Skin for the Old Ceremony	Columbia	Producer/Arranger/Performer
Mary Fahl	Love & Gravity	BMI Publishing	Producer/Arranger/Performer
Mary Fahl	Four Sings	BMI Publishing	Producer/Arranger/Performer
Mary Fahl	The Other Side of Time	Odyssey	Producer/Arranger/Performer
Bette Midler	Songs From the New Depression	Atlantic Records	Arranger/Conductor
Loudon Wainwright III	Final Exam	Arista Records	Producer/Arranger/Performer
Loudon Wainwright III	T-shirt	Arista Records	Arranger/Performer
Lewis Furey	Lewis Furey	Aquarius Records	Producer/Arranger/Conductor/Performer
Lewis Furey	The Sky is Falling	Aquarius Records	Producer/Arranger/Conductor/Performer
Tony Bird	Bird of Paradise	Columbia	Producer/Arranger/Performer
Anjani	Blue Alert	Columbia	Arranger/Performer
Kiss	Peter Criss Solo Album	Casablanca Records	Conductor
The Hotel Orchestra	Swings Digital	A & M Records	Arranger/Performer/Composer
Carole Laure	Alibis	RCA Victor	Arranger/Conductor/Performer
Carole Laure	She Says Move On	Fnac Music	Arranger/Performer
Leata Galloway	Leata	Ariola	Producer/Arranger/Conductor/Performer
Clara Ponty	The Embrace	Philips Classics	Co-Producer/Arranger/Performer
Ayo	Joyful	Polydor Records	Producer/Arranger/Performer
Daniel Rodriguez	In The Presence	Blix Street Records	Arranger/Conductor
Eddie Brigati	Lost in the Wilderness	Elektra	Arranger/Conductor/Performer
Fred Stark	Time After Time	New Central Music Company, LLC	Arranger/Performer
Kenny Karen	This Day	Big Tree Records	Arranger/Performer
Lisa Gutkin	From Here On In	Independent	Producer/Performer
Ten Feet Deep	Ten Feet Deep	Independent	Producer

== Select filmography ==
=== Films ===
- Threebound (Exit 74 Productions)
- David & Layla (Newroz Films)
- Seven (Cecchi Gori Pictures)
- The Last Godfather (TLG)
- Watchmen (Warner Bros.)
- That Thing You Do! (Clavius Base)
- Pokémon: The First Movie (4Kids Entertainment)
- Pokémon the Movie 2000 (4Kids Entertainment)
- Managua (Logo Entertainment)
- Apartment 1303 (Amuse)
- All American Bikini Car Wash (Meridien Films)
- End Call (MonteCristo International Entertainment)
- Gods and Generals (Ted Turner Pictures)
- So This is Christmas (Foster Entertainment)
- Fantastica (E.I. Productions)
- Dark Disciple (Ambassador Motion Pictures)
- The Rubber Gun (St. Lawrence Film Productions)
- L'Ange et la Femme (Films RSL)
- Montreal Main (Canadian Film Development Corporation)
- Beyond Paradise (New Roz Films)
- Jacob Two-Two Meets the Hooded Fang (1978 film) (Gulkin Productions)
- La Tete de Normande St. Onge (Cinépix)
- Rosewater (Busboy Productions)
- Pikachu's Vacation (4Kids Entertainment)
- Pokémon: Mewtwo Returns (Anime World Osaka)
- Apartment 1303 3D (1303 Productions)
- Pokémon Detective Pikachu (Warner Bros.)

=== Short films/documentaries ===
- Leonard Cohen: Dance Me to the End of Love (A-Acme Film Works)
- The Truce (Independent, NYU)
- Gone into the Clearing (Veech Productions)
- Remember (Colassalvision)
- På danske læber live (Auditorium)
- Susanna (Hidden Layers)
- Rooster (Jamison Newlander Productions)
- Mickey Lee (Lawnrunner Films)
- Crackshot Stu (Lawnrunner Films)
- Clever Grete (Tabularassa Productions)
- Hallelujah: Leonard Cohen, A Journey, A Song (Sony)

=== Television ===
- Pokémon (TV Series) (Pokémon USA)
- Supernova (Hallmark Entertainment)
- Flood: A River's Rampage (Hallmark Entertainment)
- An American Girl on the Home Front (American Girl)
- No Big Deal (Cinétudes Films)
- Shinchan (JPS Producties; Shin Ei Animation; TV Asahi)

=== Self ===
- Marianne & Leonard: Words of Love (Sundance)
- Leonard Cohen: Under Review 1934–1977 (Chrome Dreams Media)
- Hallelujah: It Goes Like This (Geller/Goldfine Productions)
- Hallelujah: Leonard Cohen, A Journey, A Song (Sony)
