= Ain't No Cure for Love =

Song by Leonard Cohen

from the album I'm Your Man
- Released: 2 February 1988
- Recorded: Late 1987
- Genre: Sophisti-pop; R&B
- Length: 4:50
- Label: Columbia
- Songwriter: Leonard Cohen
- Producer: Leonard Cohen

"Ain't No Cure for Love" is a song written by the Canadian singer-songwriter Leonard Cohen.

It was first released by the American singer Jennifer Warnes on her 1987 Leonard Cohen tribute album Famous Blue Raincoat and subsequently appeared as the second track on Cohen's 1988 studio album I'm Your Man.

== Theme and lyrics ==
As its title suggests, the theme of the song is a common and traditional one for a love song. However, the lyrics of Warnes' and Cohen's recorded versions of the song are significantly different from one another. At the length of 3:22, compared to Cohen's 4:50, Warnes' 1987 recording contains five verses, compared to Cohen's six, only the first two of which it shares with Cohen's recording of 1988.
