= Tower of Song =

Song by Leonard Cohen

from the album I'm Your Man
- Released: February 1988
- Genre: Synth-pop
- Length: 5:37
- Label: Columbia
- Songwriter: Leonard Cohen

"Tower of Song" is a song written by Leonard Cohen that appears on his 1988 album I'm Your Man. In a 2014 reader's poll, Rolling Stone listed it as the 8th favorite Cohen song.

== Background ==
The genesis of "Tower of Song" is described in Ira Nadel's 1996 Cohen memoir Various Positions:

"Tower of Song" is the keynote work of I'm Your Man. With it, Cohen wanted to "make a definitive statement about the heroic enterprise of the craft" of songwriting. In the early eighties, he called the work "Raise My Voice in Song." His concern was with the aging songwriter, and the "necessity to transcend one's own failure by manifesting as the singer, as the songwriter." He had abandoned the song, but one night in Montreal he finished the lyrics and called an engineer and recorded it in one take with a toy synthesizer.

Cohen revised the song, which contains the rumination, "I was born like this, I had no choice/I was born with the gift of a golden voice." Ever mindful of his reputation as a "flat singer" among critics, audiences often reacted when Cohen sang these lines live. Cohen also cited Hank Williams, a songwriter he had professed great admiration for, in the song ("...a hundred floors above me...").

Cohen recited the lyrics in full when he was inducted into the Rock and Roll Hall of Fame.

== Cover versions ==
"Tower of Song" has been covered by many artists, notably on the tribute albums I'm Your Fan (separate covers by Robert Forster and by Nick Cave and the Bad Seeds) and Leonard Cohen: I'm Your Man (separate covers by Martha Wainwright and U2). The song was the first track on Tom Jones's UK top 10 charted album of covers, Spirit in the Room. In 2020 The Guardian ranked his version as N°2 in its list of 20 best Tom Jones songs.

Shaar Hashomayim Choir, Willie Nelson, Céline Dion, Peter Gabriel and Chris Martin performed the song at the 2017 Tower of Song: A Memorial Tribute to Leonard Cohen concert.
