= Who by Fire (song) =

1970s song by Leonard Cohen

Song by Leonard Cohen

from the album New Skin for the Old Ceremony
- Released: 1974-08-30
- Recorded: February 1974
- Studio: Sound Ideas Studio, New York
- Genre: Folk rock
- Length: 2:33
- Label: Columbia
- Songwriter: Leonard Cohen
- Producers: Leonard Cohen; John Lissauer

"Who by Fire" is a song written by Canadian poet and musician Leonard Cohen in the 1970s. It explicitly relates to Cohen's Jewish roots, echoing the words of the Unetanneh Tokef prayer. In synagogues, the prayer is recited during the High Holy Days. The song was written after Cohen's improvised concerts for Israeli soldiers in the Sinai Peninsula during the Yom Kippur War. The song is sung as a duet with Jewish-American singer Janis Ian. It was included on Cohen's 1974 album New Skin for the Old Ceremony.

== Background ==
On October 6, 1973, the Yom Kippur War started when an Arab coalition led by Egypt and Syria, launched a surprise attack on the Jewish holy day of Yom Kippur. Amid high fatalities among Israeli soldiers and a sense of despair in the country, Cohen arrived in the country to perform on the battlefield in the Sinai Peninsula for small groups of soldiers. He said: “I am joining my brothers fighting in the desert,” adding “I don’t care if their war is just or not. I know only that war is cruel, that it leaves bones, blood and ugly stains on the holy soil.” He arrived to perform with a pickup band of four Israeli musicians. Cohen wrote and shelved a manuscript about the experience.

The song is a meditation on death and was inspired by the Unetanneh Tokef prayer recited in synagogues during the High Holy Days. The prayers begins: “On Rosh HaShanah it is written, and on Yom Kippur it is sealed. How many will pass and how many will be created.” In his adaptation of the prayer, Cohen added a question to the traditional liturgy: “And who shall I say is calling?"

== Cultural impact ==
In 2022, Canadian-Israeli journalist Matti Friedman referenced the song title with his book, Who by Fire: Leonard Cohen in the Sinai. The book is an account of Cohen's experience performing in the Sinai.

A 2024 French-Canadian film, Who by Fire, directly references the song in its English-language title.

== Cover versions ==
- In 2021, First Aid Kit performed the song in their live concert of Cohen songs, and it was later featured on their album, Who by Fire.
- In 2022, the British artist, PJ Harvey released a cover version of the song. Harvey recorded with composer Tim Phillips for the Irish Apple TV+ series Bad Sisters.
- In 2023, Beth Orton and Skinny Pelembe released their rendition of the song.
- In 2024, LUCIFER released a cover featuring vocalist Bobby Liebling of Pentagram.
