= I'm Your Man (Leonard Cohen song) =

Single by Leonard Cohen

from the album I'm Your Man
- Released: 1988
- Recorded: 1987
- Genre: Sophisti-pop
- Length: 4:28
- Label: Columbia Records
- Songwriter: Leonard Cohen
- Producer: Leonard Cohen

"I'm Your Man" is a song written by Canadian singer-songwriter Leonard Cohen, which appeared on Cohen's 1988 album, I'm Your Man. Released as a single in 1988, it reached number 57 in the French charts after Cohen's death in 2016.

== Song ==
"I'm Your Man" was first released on Cohen's album I'm Your Man, in February 1988. It was then released as the second single from the album, failing to chart anywhere. After Cohen's death in November 2016, it reached number 57 in France.

In Paul Zollo's book Songwriters on Songwriting, Cohen said of the song, "I sweated over that one. I really sweated over it. I can show you the notebook for that. It started off as a song called 'I Cried Enough for You'. It was related to a version of 'Waiting for a Miracle' that I recorded. The rhyme scheme was developed by toeing the line with that musical version that I put down. But it didn't work."

== Reception ==
Rolling Stone said, "Set to a cheesy drum-machine beat and sotto voce horn riffs, with more than a little suggestion of a country ballad, Cohen conversationally throws himself at the feet of a woman he's done wrong. He'd never beg for her forgiveness, of course. But if he did: 'I'd crawl to you baby and I'd fall at your feet/And I'd howl at your beauty like a dog in heat....'"

Lyrically, Pitchfork claimed, "the title track take[s] sentimental clichés—I’m addicted to love, I’ll do anything for love—to brutal extremes. Love is the monkey on his back and he’ll go to any lengths to appease it, even if it means erasing his identity. 'I'm Your Man' fades out with Cohen still singing, as if he's going to keep prostrating himself at the feet of the object of his desire until he gets an answer. There's a very good chance she's not listening." At the time of release, Rolling Stone noted, "Love as submission, a time-honoured Cohen topic, takes on a conspiratorial friendliness."

== Charts ==
Chart (2016)	Peak position
France (SNEP)	57
