= I'm Your Man (Leonard Cohen album) =

Studio album by Leonard Cohen
- Released: February 2, 1988
- Recorded: August–November 1987
- Studios: Studio Tempo, Montreal (Quebec); DMS Studios, Montreal (Quebec); Rock Steady, Los Angeles (United States)
- Genres: Synth-pop; electropop; sophisti-pop
- Length: 41:00
- Label: Columbia
- Producers: Leonard Cohen, with Jean-Michel Reusser on "Take This Waltz", and Michel Robidoux on "Everybody Knows"

Leonard Cohen chronology
| Various Positions (1984) | I'm Your Man (1988) | The Future (1992) |

Singles from I'm Your Man
- 1. "Take This Waltz" Released: 1986; 2. "First We Take Manhattan" Released: 1988; 3. "I'm Your Man" Released: 1988; 4. "Ain't No Cure for Love" Released: 1988; 5. "Everybody Knows" Released: 1988; 6. "I Can't Forget" Released: 1989

I'm Your Man is the eighth studio album by Canadian singer-songwriter Leonard Cohen, released on February 2, 1988, by Columbia Records. The album marked Cohen's further move to a more modern sound, with many songs having a synthesizer-oriented production. It soon became the most successful studio album which Cohen had released in the US, and it reached number one in several European countries, transforming Cohen into a best-selling artist.

== Recording ==
I'm Your Man was recorded in Los Angeles, Montreal and Paris, and while it was the first studio album where Cohen took sole credit for the production, three contributing producers participated: Roscoe Beck, Jean-Michel Reusser and Michel Robidoux. The LP would give Cohen an updated, contemporary 80s sound, featuring songs composed primarily on keyboards and delivered in Cohen's increasingly gravelly rasp. Cohen's sound had started to evolve on his last studio album Various Positions (1984) but it is more fully realized on this album. Fellow Montrealer, Jeff Fisher, contributed his driving keyboard arrangements, playing all the music on "First We Take Manhattan" and "Jazz Police", and arranging and playing on "There Ain't No Cure for Love". Cohen's collaboration with Fisher, who delivered a "cinematic" feel reminiscent of Ennio Morricone, "convinced Cohen the album was possible". In his book Leonard Cohen: A Remarkable Life (2010), biographer Anthony Reynolds observes, "...in almost every respect I'm Your Man marked not so much a progression but an evolutionary leap forward...Cohen's new musical canvas was rich and wide, with its bold and bald use of sequencers, drum machines, synclavier and synths all mixed exotically with the lingering eastern European textures of the bouzouki, the oud, and the heart rending (old Russian school) violin." Cohen felt his singing had improved as well, telling Adrian Deevoy of Q magazine in 1991, "Sometimes I can’t stand the sound of my voice. It went through periods. The first and second records it sounded right. Then I stopped being able to find the right voice for the songs. The songs were good and the intention was good but the voice wasn’t really up to it. I lost it for a while. When I did Various Positions it was coming back and when I got to I’m Your Man I was in full stride." In 1997, he reiterated to Nigel Williamson of Uncut, "On I'm Your Man, my voice had settled and I didn't feel ambiguous about it. I could at last deliver the songs with the authority and intensity required."

== Composition ==
The album includes some of Cohen's most popular songs and concert staples, including the single "Ain't No Cure for Love", "First We Take Manhattan", "Tower of Song", and "Everybody Knows", which was a collaboration with Cohen's backing vocalist Sharon Robinson. "Everybody Knows" is known for its somber tone and repetition of the title at the beginning of most verses. Featuring phrases such as "Everybody knows that the dice are loaded" and "Everybody knows that the good guys lost", the song has been variously described by critics as "bitterly pessimistic" yet funny, or, more strongly, a "bleak prophecy about the end of the world as we know it." The lyrics include references to AIDS, social problems, and relationship and religion issues. The album's opening track, "First We Take Manhattan" (originally called "In Old Berlin"), deals with geopolitical ideas, specifically extremism, as he explained himself in a backstage interview:

I think it means exactly what it says. It is a terrorist song. I think it's a response to terrorism. There's something about terrorism that I've always admired. The fact that there are no alibis or no compromises. That position is always very attractive. I don't like it when it's manifested on the physical plane – I don't really enjoy the terrorist activities – but Psychic Terrorism. I remember there was a great poem by Irving Layton that I once read – I'll give you a paraphrase of it – it was "Well, you guys blow up an occasional airline and kill a few children here and there," he says. But our terrorists, Jesus, Freud, Marx, Einstein. The whole world is still quaking...

"Take This Waltz" was originally released as part the 1986 Federico García Lorca tribute album Poets in New York (Poetas en Nueva York) and as a single. It reached number one in Spain in 1986. The song appears on I'm Your Man in slightly re-arranged version (with addition of violin and Jennifer Warnes's duet vocals, both absent from the 1986 version). The song's lyrics are a loose translation of the poem "Pequeño vals vienés" by the Spanish poet Federico García Lorca (one of Cohen's favorite poets). The poem was first published in Lorca's seminal book Poet in New York/Poeta en Nueva York. In his 2010 Cohen biography, Anthony Reynolds claims that the unorthodox "Jazz Police" was Cohen's response to his band's effort to introduce augmented fifths and sevenths to their playing. He "policed" such jazz intrusions, although he "wasn't sure of the lyric's meaning and grew to dislike the conceit." The genesis of "Tower of Song" is described in Ira Nadel's 1996 Cohen memoir Various Positions:

"Tower of Song" is the keynote work of I'm Your Man. With it Cohen wanted to "make a definitive statement about the heroic enterprise of the craft" of songwriting. In the early eighties he called the work "Raise My Voice in Song". His concern was with the aging songwriter, and the "necessity to transcend one's own failure by manifesting as the singer, as the songwriter." He had abandoned the song, but one night in Montreal he finished the lyrics and called an engineer and recorded it in one take with a toy synthesizer.

Cohen revised the song, which contains the rumination, "I was born like this, I had no choice/I was born with the gift of a golden voice." Ever mindful of his reputation as a "flat singer" among critics, audiences always erupted when Cohen sang these lines live. Cohen also cites Hank Williams, a songwriter he has professed great admiration for, in the song ("...a hundred floors above me..."). Cohen recited the lyrics in full when he was inducted into the Rock and Roll Hall of Fame.

Although Cohen had earned a reputation among critics and some listeners for excessive gloominess, several tracks on the album displayed his wry sense of humor and playfulness, such as the lascivious title track and "I Can't Forget", which he cited in a BBC interview with John Archer after the album's release as an example of his simpler approach: "I had to go back to the beginning and determine where I was in regard to my own song and I realized that I'd have to find another kind of language that was much flatter, which I think this record has...I began that lyric just trying to locate myself...That was really close to the bone, and that's where I like to keep my lyrics now." In the Paul Zollo book Songwriters on Songwriting (1991), Cohen said of the song "I'm Your Man": "I sweated over that one. I really sweated over it. I can show you the notebook for that. It started off as a song called "I Cried Enough for You". It was related to a version of "Waiting for a Miracle" that I recorded. The rhyme scheme was developed by toeing the line with that musical version that I put down. But it didn't work." "Ain't No Cure for Love", with its slick AOR sound, was chosen as the first single. Although I'm Your Man did not do as well in the United States as it did in other countries, CBS Records awarded Cohen with the Crystal Globe award, reserved for artists who have sold more than five million albums overseas, to which Cohen famously quipped, "I have always been touched by the modesty of their interest in my work."

== Album cover ==
The album cover may be Cohen's most memorable, featuring the dapper singer eating a banana. As recounted in Ira Nadel's Various Positions, Cohen was at a Los Angeles warehouse to watch the filming of Jennifer Warnes's music video "First We Take Manhattan" and was photographed by publicist Sharon Weisz in his dark glasses, charcoal gray pin-striped suit, and white T-shirt chomping on a banana: "Sharon showed it to me later and it seemed to sum me up perfectly. 'Here's this guy looking cool,' I thought, 'in shades and a nice suit. He seems to have a grip on things, an idea of himself.' And it suddenly occurred to me that's everyone's dilemma: at the times we think we're the coolest, what everyone else sees is a guy with his mouth full of banana." Cohen liked the image so much that he not only used it for the album cover but as the poster images of his 1988 world tour.

== Critical reception ==
Professional ratings
Review scores
| Source | Rating |
|---|---|
| AllMusic | 4.5/5 stars |
| Entertainment Weekly | A− |
| Los Angeles Times | 3/4 stars |
| Mojo | 5/5 stars |
| NME | 8/10 |
| Pitchfork | 9.5/10 |
| Rolling Stone | 4/5 stars |
| The Rolling Stone Album Guide | 4/5 stars |
| Spin Alternative Record Guide | 9/10 |
| The Village Voice | A− |

I'm Your Man was hailed by music critics as a return to form. It was No. 1 in Norway for 16 weeks. The album is silver in the UK and gold in Canada. In the original Rolling Stone review, David Browne called it "the first Cohen album that can be listened to during the daylight hours." Jason Ankeny of AllMusic writes that I'm Your Man "re-establishes Leonard Cohen's mastery. Against a backdrop of keyboards and propulsive rhythms, Cohen surveys the global landscape with a precise, unflinching eye: the opening 'First We Take Manhattan' is an ominous fantasy of commercial success bundled in crypto-fascist imagery, while the remarkable 'Everybody Knows' is a cynical catalog of the land mines littering the surface of love in the age of AIDS." It was ranked 51 on Pitchfork's list of the 100 best albums of the 1980s. Tom Waits has named it one of his favourite albums. Slant Magazine listed the album at number 29 on its list of "Best Albums of the 1980s". In a Rolling Stone top ten readers poll, three songs from the album – "I'm Your Man", "Tower of Song", and "Everybody Knows" – were voted the best Leonard Cohen songs of all time, ranking #10, #8 and #4, respectively. The album was also included in the book 1001 Albums You Must Hear Before You Die. It was voted number 495 in the third edition of Colin Larkin's All Time Top 1000 Albums (2000).

== Track listing ==
Side one
| No. | Title | Writer(s) | Length |
|---|---|---|---|
| 1. | "First We Take Manhattan" | Leonard Cohen | 6:01 |
| 2. | "Ain't No Cure for Love" | Cohen | 4:50 |
| 3. | "Everybody Knows" | Cohen; Sharon Robinson | 5:36 |
| 4. | "I'm Your Man" | Cohen | 4:28 |

Side two
| No. | Title | Writer(s) | Length |
|---|---|---|---|
| 5. | "Take This Waltz" | Federico García Lorca; Cohen | 5:59 |
| 6. | "Jazz Police" | Cohen; Jeff Fisher | 3:53 |
| 7. | "I Can't Forget" | Cohen | 4:31 |
| 8. | "Tower of Song" | Cohen | 5:37 |

== Personnel ==
=== Musicians ===
- Leonard Cohen – keyboards, vocals
- Jude Johnstone – vocals
- Anjani Thomas – vocals
- Jennifer Warnes – vocals
- Mayel Assouly – backing vocals
- Evelyine Hebey – backing vocals
- Elisabeth Valletti – backing vocals
- Jeff Fisher – all instruments (tracks 1, 6) keyboards (track 2)
- Jean-Philippe Rykiel – keyboard (track 5)
- Bob Stanley – guitar
- Sneaky Pete Kleinow – pedal steel guitar
- Peter Kisilenko – bass
- Tom Brechtlein – drums
- Vinnie Colaiuta – drums
- Lenny Castro – percussion
- Michel Robidoux – drums, keyboards
- John Bilezikjian – oud
- Richard Beaudet – saxophone
- Raffi Hakopian – violin

=== Production ===
- Leonard Cohen – arrangement, production
- Jeff Fisher – arrangement (tracks 1, 2, 6)
- Jean-Philippe Rykiel – arrangement (track 5)
- Roscoe Beck – production coordination
- Ian Terry – engineering
- François Deschamps – engineering
- Leanne Ungar – mixing, technical coordination
- Fred Echelard – mixing
- Roger Guerin engineering (tracks 3 & 4)

== Charts ==
| Chart (1988) | Peak position |
|---|---|
| Austrian Albums (Ö3 Austria) | 22 |
| Canada Top Albums/CDs (RPM) | 34 |
| Dutch Albums (Album Top 100) | 16 |
| European Albums (Eurotipsheet) | 17 |
| Finnish Albums (Suomen virallinen lista) | 2 |
| French Albums (SNEP) | 30 |
| German Albums (Offizielle Top 100) | 32 |
| Norwegian Albums (VG-lista) | 1 |
| Swedish Albums (Sverigetopplistan) | 6 |
| Swiss Albums (Schweizer Hitparade) | 9 |
| UK Albums (Official Charts) | 48 |

| Chart (2009) | Peak position |
|---|---|
| Spanish Albums (Promusicae) | 45 |

| Chart (2016) | Peak position |
|---|---|
| French Albums (SNEP) | 176 |

| Chart (2024) | Peak position |
|---|---|
| Greek Albums (IFPI) | 64 |

== Certifications and sales ==
| Region | Certification | Certified units/sales |
|---|---|---|
| Canada (Music Canada) | 2× Platinum | 200,000^{‡} |
| Denmark (IFPI Danmark) | 3× Platinum | 60,000^{‡} |
| Finland (Musiikkituottajat) | Gold | 25,696 |
| France (SNEP) | Gold | 100,000^{*} |
| Norway (IFPI Norway) | 4× Platinum | 200,000^{*} |
| Spain (Promusicae) | Platinum | 100,000^{^} |
| Sweden (GLF) | Platinum | 100,000^{^} |
| United Kingdom (BPI) | Gold | 100,000^{*} |
^{*} Sales figures based on certification alone.^{^} Shipments figures based on certification alone.^{‡} Sales+streaming figures based on certification alone.
