= Eric Johnson discography =

This is the discography for American rock musician Eric Johnson.

== Albums ==
=== Studio albums ===
Title	Album details	Peak chart positions		Sales
Title	Album details	US	JPN	Sales
Tones	Released: March 12, 1986; Label: Reprise; Formats: CD, CS, LP, digital download	—	—	US: 186,384
Ah Via Musicom	Released: March 20, 1990; Label: Capitol; Formats: CD, CS, LP, digital download	67	—	US: 705,616
Venus Isle	Released: September 3, 1996; Label: Capitol; Formats: CD, digital download	51	88	US: 183,773
Seven Worlds	Released: November 6, 1998; Label: Ark 21; Formats: CD	—	—	US: 24,074
Souvenir	Released: January 13, 2003; Label: Vortexan Records; Formats: CD	—	—	
Bloom	Released: June 14, 2005; Label: Favored Nations; Formats: CD, digital download	—	140	
Up Close	Released: December 7, 2010; Label: EMI, Vortexan; Formats: CD, LP, digital download	—	—	
Eclectic	Released August 27, 2014; Label: Concord Music Group; Formats: CD, digital download	—	—	
EJ	Released October 7, 2016; Label: Provogue; Formats: CD, vinyl, mp3, streaming	—	—	
Collage	Released November 17, 2017; Label: Vortexan; Formats: CD, digital download	—	—	
EJ Vol II	Released March 6, 2020; Label: Vortexan; Formats: CD, streaming	—	—	
The Book of Making / Yesterday Meets Today	Released July 29, 2022; Label: Blue Elan Records; Formats: CD, LP, streaming	—	—	
"—" denotes a recording that did not chart or was not released in that territory.

=== Live albums ===
Title	Album details	Peak chart positions				
Title	Album details	FIN	FRA	JPN	NLD	UK
G3: Live in Concert (with Joe Satriani and Steve Vai)	Released: June 3, 1997; Label: Sony; Formats: CD, CS, digital download	35	20	37	52	82
Live and Beyond (with Alien Love Child)	Released: Oct, 24 2000; Label: Favored Nations; Formats CD, DD	—	—	—	—	—
Live from Austin, TX	Released: November 1, 2005; Label: New West Records; Formats: CD, digital download	—	—	—	—	—
Live from Austin TX '84	Released: November 22, 2010; Label: New West; Formats: CD, digital download	—	—	—	—	—
Europe Live	Released: June 23, 2014; Label: Mascot Label Group; Formats: CD, LP	—	—	123	—	—
"—" denotes a recording that did not chart or was not released in that territory.

=== Video albums ===
Title	Album details	Peak chart positions	Certifications
Title	Album details	US Video	Certifications
G3: Live in Concert with Joe Satriani and Steve Vai	Released: June 3, 1997; Label: Sony; Formats: VHS, DVD	37	RIAA: Platinum
Live from Austin, TX	Released: November 1, 2005; Label: New West; Formats: DVD	—	
Anaheim	Released: November 11, 2008; Label: Vanguard; Formats: DVD	—	
"—" denotes a recording that did not chart or was not released in that territory.

== Instructional videos ==
Title	Album details	Notes
Eric Johnson: Total Electric Guitar	Released: 1990; Label: Hot Licks; Formats: VHS	re-released as DVD on November 15, 2005
Eric Johnson: The Fine Art of Guitar	Released: 1996; Label: Hot Licks; Formats: VHS	re-released as DVD on March 7, 2006
Eric Johnson: The Art of Guitar	Released: February 1, 2006; Label: Hal Leonard; Formats: DVD	

== Singles ==
Title	Year	Peak chart positions	Album
Title	Year	US Main.	Album
"Righteous"	1990	8	Ah Via Musicom
"High Landrons"	1990	31	Ah Via Musicom
"Cliffs of Dover"	1990	5	Ah Via Musicom
"Trademark"	1991	7	Ah Via Musicom
"Pavilion"	1996	33	Venus Isle
"Beck's Bolero"	2007	—	non-album single
"The Wind Cries Mary"	2013	—	non-album single
"Tidal"	2013	—	non-album single
"Wonder"	2013	—	non-album single
"Imagination of You" (feat. Christopher Cross)	2013	—	non-album single
"To Whom It May Concern"	2013	—	non-album single
"—" denotes a recording that did not chart or was not released in that territory.

== Other appearances ==
Album	Song	Year	Notes	Ref.
Perpetuum Mobile by Mariani	—	1970	band member	
Electromagnets by Electromagnets	—	1975	band member	
Christopher Cross by Christopher Cross	"Minstrel Gigolo"	1979	guest	
Pearls: Songs of Goffin and King by Carole King	"_"	1980	guest	
One to One by Carole King	"One to One", "(Love Is Like A) Boomerang", "Lookin' Out for Number One", "Life Without Love", "Golden Man"	1982	guest	
Long Time Friends by Alessi	"Rise Up"	1982	guest	
Marc Anthony Thompson by Marc Anthony Thompson	"Recover Gracefully"	1984	guest	
Stand Up by Steve Morse Band	"Distant Star"	1985	guest	
Street Language by Rodney Crowell	"Ballad of Fast Eddie"	1986		
Guitar Speak	"Western Flyer"	1988	compilation of various artists	
Willie Jones by Willie Jones	"So Long Mary Jane"	1990	guest	
The Urge by Stuart Hamm	"On Our Dreams" and "Lone Star"	1991	guest	
Instrumental Moods	"Cliffs of Dover"	1991	compilation of various artists	
Guitar's Practicing Musicians, Vol. 2	"Cliffs of Dover"	1991	compilation of various artists	
Rush Street by Richard Marx	"Keep Coming Back"	1992	guest	
The Hunter by Jennifer Warnes	"Lights of Louisiana" and "I Can't Hide"	1992	guest	
Rendezvous by Christopher Cross	"Nothing Will Change"	1992	guest	
Herman Harris & the Voices of Hope by Herman Harris	—	1993	guest	
Read My Licks by Chet Atkins	"Somebody Loves Me Now"	1994	guest	
Wave of the Hand by Carla Olson	"I'm Trying"	1995	guest	
True Voices	"At The End of the Day" with Susan Cowsill	1995	compilation of various artists	
Angelica	"Ave Maria"	1997	compilation of various artists	
Merry Axemas	"The First Nowell"	1997	compilation of various artists	
Guitar Gods	"Trademark"	1998	guest	
Walking in Avalon by Christopher Cross	"When She Smiles"	1998	guest	
Koko's Hideaway by Van Wilks	"Vanquila"	1999	guest	
The Best of Rockline	"S.R.V."	1999	compilation of various artists	
Moods Box Set	"Cliffs of Dover"	1999	compilation of various artists	
Fingers And Thumbs by Adrian Legg	"Lunchtime at Rosie's"	1999	guest	
Live and Beyond by Alien Love Child	—	2000	band member	
Been A Long Time by Double Trouble	"In The Garden"	2001	guest	
Texas Guitar Slingers Vol. 1	"Enzo Shuffle"	2002	compilation of various artists	
More To Life Than This by Mike Tramp	"On The Good, The Sad, And The Ugly"	2003	guest	
A Guitar Supreme, Giant Steps in Fusion Guitar	"Resolution"	2004	compilation of various artists	
Don't Mess With Texas Vol. 2	"Boogie King"	2004	compilation of various artists	
KGSR 107.1 Broadcasts Vol. 12	"Song For George"	2004	compilation of various artists	
Fusion For Miles, A Guitar Tribute: A Bitchin' Brew	"Jean Pierre"	2005	compilation of various artists	
Industrial Zen by John McLaughlin	"New Blues Old Bruise"	2006	guest	
Viva Carlos: A Supernatural Marathon Celebration	"Aqua Marine"	2006	compilation of various artists	
Walk On by Roscoe Beck	"Together All The Time"	2006	guest	
Electromagnets 2 by Electromagnets	—	2006	band member	
The Devil Knows My Name by John5	"The Washing Away of Wrong"	2007	guest	
Freeway Jam: To Beck and Back	"Beck's Bolero"	2007	compilation of various artists	
Lovers by Bobby Whitlock and CoCo Carmel	"Layla"	2008	guest	
From The Reach by Sonny Landreth	"The Milky Way Home"	2008	guest	
Bridging the Gap by Doyle Dykes	"Red Clay"	2008	guest	
Big Neighborhood by Mike Stern	"6th Street" and "Long Time Gone"	2009	guest	
Doctor Faith by Christopher Cross	"Hey Kid"	2010	guest	
Elemental Journey by Sonny Landreth	"Passionola"	2012	guest	
Musica E Palavras Dos Bee Gees (Bee Gees Tribute Album) by Ana Gazzola	"Run To Me"	2012	guest	
2776	"Not What the Founders Intended"	2014	compilation of various artists	
Good For Sumthin by Eric Gales	"E2 (Note for Note)"	2014	Guest	
