= Bloom (Eric Johnson album) =

Studio album by Eric Johnson
- Released: June 14, 2005
- Studio: Saucer Sound Studios and Surfland (Austin, Texas); One Good Ear (Los Angeles, California); No Favors Studio (Studio City, California); RCA Studio B and Kampo Studios (New York City, New York); Minutia Studios (Nashville, Tennessee)
- Genre: Rock, instrumental rock
- Length: 59:08
- Label: Favored Nations
- Producer: Eric Johnson Richard Mullen

Eric Johnson chronology
Souvenir (2002)	Bloom (2005)	Live from Austin, TX (2005)

Professional ratings
Review scores
Source	Rating
AllMusic	3.5/5 stars

Bloom is Eric Johnson's fifth studio release, released in June 2005. It was the first studio release since his 1996 album Venus Isle almost nine years prior. However, in these nine years he had released a live album by his side-project Alien Love Child entitled Live and Beyond in 2000, as well as two albums of previously unreleased material: Seven Worlds in 1998 and Souvenir in 2002.

The album is split into three sections, 'Prelude' (tracks 1–6), 'Courante' (tracks 7–12) and 'Allemande' (tracks 13–16). The album was nominated for a Grammy Award in 2006 under the category of Best Pop Instrumental Album.

== Track listing ==
All songs written by Eric Johnson, except where noted.

- Prelude
1. "Bloom" – 3:10
2. "Summer Jam" – 2:11
3. "My Back Pages" (Bob Dylan) – 3:47
4. "Good to Me" – 4:31
5. "Columbia" – 2:22
6. "12 to 12 Vibe" – 2:21
- Courante
7. "Sea Secret" – 1:57
8. "Sad Legacy" – 4:06
9. "From My Heart" - 7:26
10. "Cruise the Nile" - 2:13
11. "Tribute to Jerry Reed" – 2:27
12. "Your Sweet Eyes" – 6:08
- Allemande
13. "Hesitant" – 6:28
14. "Sunnaround You" – 3:07
15. "Magnetized" – 3:21
16. "Ciel" – 3:26

== Personnel ==
- Eric Johnson – acoustic piano (1, 3, 8, 9, 14, 16), guitars (1–15), bass (1, 2, 6), backing vocals (1), lap steel guitar (3, 4, 7, 12), vocals (3, 4, 8, 9, 12, 14), synthesizers (7–9, 12, 16), percussion (7), electric sitar (10), Rhodes electric piano (13, 14), classical guitar (16)
- Rich Harney – acoustic piano (13)
- Adrian Legg – guitar solo (11)
- Chris Maresh – bass (3, 5, 8, 9, 12, 15), acoustic bass (10)
- Tony Phillips – bass (4), drums (4), synthesizers (5, 8, 10)
- Roscoe Beck – bass (11, 13, 14)
- Tal Bergman – drums (1)
- Tommy Taylor – drums (2, 4, 5, 12), percussion (3)
- Bill Maddox – drums (3, 8, 12, 15), drum loops (10), percussion (15)
- Tom Brechtlein – drums (6, 11, 13, 14)
- Barry "Frosty" Smith – drums (9)
- Richard Mullen – drum programming (12)
- James Fenner – percussion (5, 6, 9)
- Thomas Burrit – percussion (10)
- Brad Evilsizer – percussion (12)
- Salvatore Banzai La Rocca – mouth harp (4)
- Stephen Barber – additional vocals (4), acoustic piano (13), Moog synthesizer (14)
- Jody Lazo – vocals (10)
- Shawn Colvin – vocals (12), backing vocals (12)
- Lisa Tingle – vocals (14)

=== Production ===
- Eric Johnson – producer
- Richard Mullen – producer, recording, mixing (2, 3, 6, 7, 9, 12, 13, 15, 16)
- Tal Bergman – recording
- Bobby Cochran – recording
- Bill Maddox – recording
- Tony Phillips – recording, mixing (4, 5, 8–10)
- Pat Dillett – mixing (1)
- Gary Pacsoza – mixing (11)
- Thomas Johnson – mix assistant (11)
- Dustin Sears – technician
- Jeff Van Zandt – technician
- UE Nastasi – mastering at Sterling Sound (New York City, New York)
- Max Crace – design, photography
- Anne Daniels – paper artwork
- Steve Shaw – flower artwork
- Joe Priesnitz – management

== Awards and nominations ==
Grammy Awards

Year	Nominated	Category
2006	Eric Johnson	Best Pop Instrumental Album
