= Mr. P.C. =

Composition by John Coltrane

from the album Giant Steps
- Released: 1960
- Recorded: May 1959
- Genre: Jazz
- Length: 6:57
- Label: Atlantic
- Composer: John Coltrane
- Producer: Nesuhi Ertegün

"Mr. P.C." is a twelve-bar jazz piece in minor blues form, composed by John Coltrane in 1959. The song is named in tribute to the bass player Paul Chambers, who had accompanied Coltrane for years. It first appeared on the album Giant Steps, where it was played with a fast swing feel.

Coltrane researcher Lewis Porter has written about the composition's relationship to the melody of the 1931 popular song "Shadrack" by Robert MacGimsey, which is itself believed to be based on earlier folk songs. Saxophonist Sonny Rollins recorded "Shadrack" in 1951 for his Sonny Rollins Quartet 10" album, and Louis Armstrong can be seen singing "Shadrack" in the 1951 film The Strip.

== Form and changes ==
"Mr PC" is a 12 bar minor blues. It has these chord changes:

||: Cmin7 | Cmin7 | Cmin7 Bb/C | Cmin7 (C7) ||
|| Fmin7 | Fmin7 | Cmin7 Bb/C | Cmin7 ||
|| Ab7 | G9 | Cmin7 Bb/C | Cmin7 :||

== Cover versions ==
"Mr. PC" has been covered by:

- Lambert, Hendricks & Ross on The Hottest New Group in Jazz (1960)
- Derek Trucks on The Derek Trucks Band (1997)
- Free Radicals (band) on Our Lady of Eternal Sunny Delights (album) (2000)
- Rahsaan Roland Kirk with Jon Hendricks on The Man Who Cried Fire (2002, recorded 1970s)
- Eric Johnson on Europe Live (2014)
- Gene Ludwig and Pat Martino on Young Guns (2014, recorded 1968 or 1969)
