= Live from Austin, TX (Eric Johnson album) =

Live album by Eric Johnson
- Released: November 2005
- Recorded: 14 December 1988
- Genre: Instrumental rock Rock
- Label: New West
- Producer: Eric Johnson

Eric Johnson chronology
Bloom (2005)	Live from Austin, TX (2005)

Professional ratings
Review scores
Source	Rating
Allmusic	3.5/5 stars

Live from Austin, TX is Eric Johnson's first live album, released in November 2005. The album showcases Johnson's seminal 1988 performance at Austin City Limits. The performance included a number of songs from Ah Via Musicom before its release in 1990, the album that a few years later would launch Johnson to fame as well as a pair of Jimi Hendrix covers.

== Track listing ==
All songs written by Eric Johnson, except where noted.

1. "Righteous" – 3:28
2. "Love or Confusion" (Jimi Hendrix) – 3:05
3. "Steve's Boogie" – 1:55
4. "Trail of Tears" (Johnson, Stephen Barber, Carla Olsen) – 9:21
5. "Western Flyer" (Johnson, Roscoe Beck, Tommy Taylor) – 3:43
6. "East Wes" – 4:06
7. "C.W." (Kyle Brock) – 0:55
8. "Camel's Night Out" (Kyle Brock, Mark Younger-Smith) – 4:16
9. "Emerald Eyes" (Johnson, Jay Aaron) – 4:17
10. "Cliffs of Dover" – 6:13
11. "Desert Rose" (Johnson, Vince Mariani) – 4:57
12. "Zap" – 5:38
13. "Are You Experienced?" (Jimi Hendrix)

== Personnel ==
- Eric Johnson - vocals, lead guitar
- Kyle Brock - bass guitar
- Tommy Taylor - drums
