= Tommy Taylor (musician) =

American Musician and recording artist

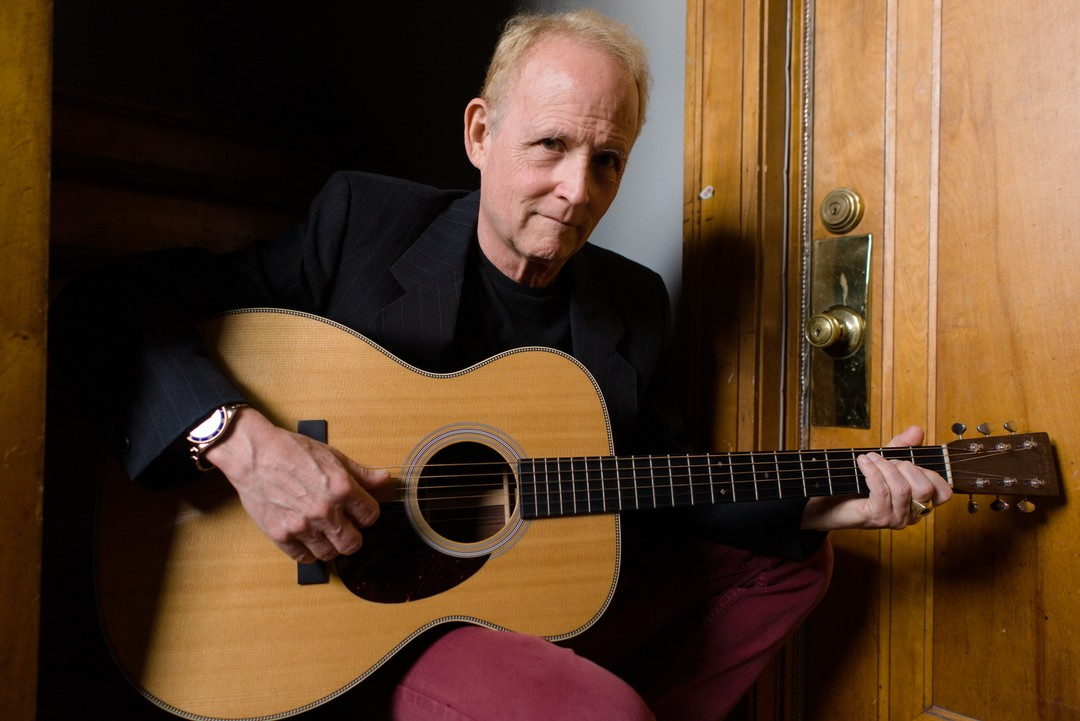

Background information
- Born: Tommy Taylor; May 8, 1957 (age 69); Denton, Texas, U.S.
- Genres: Rock, blues, pop
- Occupations: Musician, singer, songwriter
- Instruments: Drums, guitar, percussion, vocals
- Years active: 1968–present
- Labels: Capitol Records, Warner Bros. Records
- Website: www.tommytaylor.com//

Tommy Taylor (born May 8, 1957) is an American musician, vocalist and songwriter, who is best known for being a touring and recording member with Christopher Cross and Eric Johnson.

== Early years ==
Developing an infatuation with many types of music at a very early age, he quickly expanded his interests, exploring the playing of various musical instruments and singing. He acquired his first guitar at the age of eight in December 1965, discovering by chance, that he was also potentially quite adept at playing the drums, drumming became his primary objective.

By age eleven he was working professionally as a drummer, and by age thirteen, he was headlining the most prominent night spots in Austin, TX.

=== Christopher Cross ===
In 1977, Taylor became drummer and vocalist in the burgeoning original music group, Christopher Cross. His performances on Cross's classic debut LP, "Christopher Cross," helped garner five Grammy Awards in 1981, Including Album of The Year, along with a five-time Platinum Certification. Taylor also featured on two tracks on Cross' second album, Another Page. When touring the world, Christopher Cross opened for Bonnie Raitt, Fleetwood Mac, The Eagles, Foreigner, Cheap Trick, and America, as well as headlining their own concert dates.

=== Eric Johnson ===
In 1984, Taylor began what would become a lifetime partnership with fellow Austin musician Eric Johnson. In 1988, Taylor played with Eric Johnson on the TV show, Austin City Limits, it has since become the most requested episode in 40-year history of the show, and subsequently became a CD/DVD release, along with Gold Certification. Taylor has been featured on almost every single album of Johnson's as either a drummer, percussionist, vocalist, writer, or arranger. Taylor is featured on the Grammy Award-winning smash hit, "Cliffs of Dover" from the Platinum album Ah Via Musicom among many of the studio performances over the years.

=== Present day and solo album ===
In 2018–2019, Taylor played a sold-out tour with Eric Johnson and Kyle Brock, re-playing the Ah Via Musicom album from cover to cover, along with new cuts from Johnson's record Collage. The tour featured a headline spot at 2019's Crossroads Guitar Festival, returning to the festival after 15 years.

In 2020, Taylor was due to release a debut solo LP titled, Across The Stars. It is co-produced by Mark Hallman, and features Michael Omartian, Roscoe Beck, David Lee Holt, and Mark Andes among others. On October 15, 2022, Taylor released his debut single, "Summit", from his upcoming solo album. A follow up single "Across The Stars" was also released.

In 2023, Taylor released his third single, "Everybody's Gonna Let You Down". The Across The Stars album was released on September 22, 2023.

== Discography ==
=== Solo ===
- Across The Stars (2023)

=== With The NewMatics ===
- Up Popped Pancho! (2002)

=== With Eric Johnson ===
- Tones (1986)
- Ah Via Musicom (1990)
- Venus Isle (1996)
- Souvenir (2002)
- Bloom (2005)
- Live from Austin, TX (Eric Johnson album) (2006)
- Up Close (Eric Johnson album) (2010)
- EJ (2016)
- Collage (2017)
- EJ Vol. 2 (2019)
- The Book of Making (2022)
- Yesterday Meets Today (2022)

=== With Christopher Cross ===
- Christopher Cross (1980)
- Another Page (1983)

=== Various appearances and guest work ===
- Alessi - Long Time Friends (1982)
- Lisa Rhodes - Shivers (1985)
- The Sweaters (1985)
- Eliza Gilkyson - Legend of Rainmaker (1987)
- Will and the Kill - Will and the Kill (1988)
- Tommy Elskes - King of Dixie (1992)
- Sara Hickman - Necessary Angels (1994)
- Barry Richman - The Moment of Now (1994)
- Will Sexton - Keep to Myself Sound Service (1994)
- Hamilton Pool - Return to Zero (1995)
- Kris McKay - Things That Show (1996)
- Barry Richman - Temporary Eternity (1997)
- Chris Holzhaus - Welcome to Bluzhill (1998)
- Jake Andrews - Time to Burn (1999)
- Elizabeth Rice - The Wishing Tree (2001)
- Double Trouble - Been a Long Time (2001)
- Mandy Mercier - Wild Dreams of the Shy Boys (2001)
- Kay Kay and The Rays - Big Bad Girl (2003)
- Sarah Hamman - Breath by Breath (2003)
- David Lee Holt - Perpetual Motion (2004)
- Lorrie Singer & Bradley Kopp - Walk Tall (2005)
- Brandon McHose - Life Eclipse (2007)
- Mandy Mercier - Run Out of Darkness (2007)
- Doyle Dykes - Bridging the Gap (2008)
- Carson Brock - Signs (2010)
- Mandy Mercier - Singer in a Roadhouse Band (2010)
- Van Wilks - 21st Century Blues (2015)
- Ina Forsman - Ina Forsman (2016)
- Ross William Perry - Open (2016)
- Texas Horns - Get Here Quick (2019)
- Whitney Shay - Stand Up (2020)
- Gabe Stillman - Just Say the Word (2021)
- Texas Horns - Everybody Let's Roll (2022)

=== Compilations ===
- Various - Guitar Speak (1988) - track "Western Flyer"
- All ATX - All ATX (2013)
- All ATX - British Invasion (2014)
- All ATX - Austin Goes Psychedelic (2015)
- Various - Friends of Sims (2015)
