= Tones (album) =

Studio album by Eric Johnson
- Released: 1986
- Recorded: August 28 – November 17, 1985
- Studio: Ocean Way Recording (Hollywood, California); Amigo Studios (North Hollywood, California); Lion Share Studios (Los Angeles, California)
- Genre: Instrumental rock, rock
- Length: 45:31
- Label: Reprise
- Producer: David Tickle

Eric Johnson chronology
Tones (1986)	Ah Via Musicom (1990)

Singles from Tones
- 1. "Off My Mind" / "Zap" Released: 1986; 2. "Trail of Tears" Released: 1986

Tones is the first studio album by guitarist Eric Johnson, released in 1986 through Reprise Records; a remastered edition was reissued on February 23, 2010 through Wounded Bird Records. Both "Zap" and "Emerald Eyes" are re-recordings from Johnson's then-unreleased 1978 debut album Seven Worlds, which eventually saw an official release in 1998. The instrumental "Zap", released as a B-side to the single "Off My Mind", was nominated for Best Rock Instrumental Performance at the 1987 Grammy Awards.

== Critical reception ==
Professional ratings
Review scores
Source	Rating
AllMusic	4/5 stars

Daniel Gioffre at AllMusic gave Tones four stars out of five, calling it "an exceptionally strong debut" and "a beautiful and important album by one of the greatest electric guitarists ever to pick up the instrument." He also noted "Trail of Tears" and "Bristol Shore" as highlights.

== Track listing ==
All tracks are written by Eric Johnson, except where noted.

No.	Title	Length
1.	"Soulful Terrain"	4:16
2.	"Friends"	5:34
3.	"Emerald Eyes" (Johnson, Jay Aaron)	3:23
4.	"Off My Mind"	4:01
5.	"Desert Song"	4:15
6.	"Trail of Tears" (Johnson, Carla Olson, Stephen Barber)	6:01
7.	"Bristol Shore"	6:41
8.	"Zap"	4:43
9.	"Victory" (Johnson, Roscoe Beck, Tommy Taylor)	6:37
Total length:		45:31

== Personnel ==
Musicians and Vocalists

- Eric Johnson – vocals, keyboards, acoustic piano, guitars
- Stephen Barber – Fairlight CMI, acoustic piano
- David Tickle – Fairlight CMI, Fairlight programming, percussion
- Roscoe Beck – bass, 6-string bass
- Tommy Taylor – drums, percussion, vocals
- Jerry Marotta – percussion, vocals
- Jennifer Warnes – backing vocals

Music arrangements

- Rob Alexander
- Stephen Barber
- Roscoe Beck
- Tony Berg
- Kyle Brock
- Eric Johnson
- Bill Maddox
- Vince Mariani
- Steve Meador
- Jay Aaron Podolnick
- Tommy Taylor
- David Tickle

=== Production ===
- Felix Chamberlain – A&R direction
- Michael Ostin – A&R direction
- David Tickle – producer, recording, mixing
- David Ahlert – additional engineer
- Jerry Holmes – technician
- Dave Parks – technician
- Bernie Grundman – mastering at Bernie Grundman Mastering (Hollywood, California)
- Jeri McManus – art direction, design
- Vince Mariani – back cover artwork, liner notes
- Victoria Pearson – photography
- Joe Priesnitz – management

== Awards ==
Title	Event	Award	Result
"Zap"	1987 Grammys	Best Rock Instrumental Performance	Nominated
