= A Piece of Your Soul =

Studio album by Storyville
- Released: 1996
- Genre: Blues rock
- Label: Code Blue/Atlantic
- Producer: David Z

Storyville chronology
The Bluest Eyes (1994)	A Piece of Your Soul (1996)	Dog Years (1998)

A Piece of Your Soul is the second album by the American band Storyville, released in 1996. It was chosen as the album of the year at the Austin Music Awards.

The album peaked at No. 5 on Billboard's Blues Albums chart; it remained on the chart for more than half a year. Its first single was "Good Day for the Blues", which was a radio hit. Storyville promoted the album by opening for the Allman Brothers Band on some West Coast tour dates.

== Production ==
The album was produced by David Z. All five bandmembers contributed to the songwriting; fellow Austin musicians, including Doyle Bramhall II, helped as well. Reese Wynans played organ on A Piece of Your Soul. Compared to the debut, frontman Malford Milligan's work on the album was influenced more by soul music than by the blues.

== Critical reception ==
Professional ratings
Review scores
Source	Rating
AllMusic	4.5/5 stars
The Encyclopedia of Popular Music	2/5 stars
The Indianapolis Star	3/4 stars
MusicHound Rock: The Essential Album Guide	3/5 stars

The St. Louis Post-Dispatch called the album "a broad and colorful pallet of soulful laments ('Don't Make Me Cry'), hard-driving rockers ('Bitter Rain'), and bluesy ballads ('Blind Side')." The Indianapolis Star wrote: "A little blues, a little country, a little R&B, a little gospel ... Storyville handles all the elements masterfully."

The Sun Sentinel labeled "Don't Make Me Cry" "a slow burn of desert rat guitar and lazy back-beat drums." The Baltimore Sun determined that the album's best songs "use the blues vocabulary to express some decidedly non-traditional ideas." The Austin American-Statesman concluded that, "though A Piece of Your Soul doesn't hold up well to critical analysis, with such well-worn titles as 'Solid Ground', 'Blind Side' and 'Luck Runs Out' providing a road map to the commonplace, there's no denying how good it sounds."

AllMusic deemed it "a gritty Texas blues record, but it's delivered with enough rock & roll savvy to crossover into the mainstream."

== Track listing ==
No.	Title	Length
1.	"Bitter Rain"
2.	"Good Day for the Blues"
3.	"Blindside"
4.	"Don't Make Me Cry"
5.	"What Passes for Love"
6.	"Solid Ground"
7.	"A Piece of Your Soul"
8.	"Cynical"
9.	"Luck Runs Out"
10.	"Can't Go There Any More"
11.	"Share That Smile"
