= Outbound (Stuart Hamm album) =

Studio album by Stuart Hamm
- Released: 2000
- Genre: Rock
- Label: Favored Nations

Stuart Hamm chronology
The Urge	Outbound	Live Stu X2

Outbound is the fourth solo album by Stuart Hamm, an American bass player known for his playing style and work with artists such as Steve Vai.

It was rated 2.5 stars by AllMusic.

== Track listing ==
1. Outbound
2. ...Remember
3. The Castro Hustle
4. Star Spangled Banner
5. The Memo
6. The Tenacity Of Genes And Dreams
7. Charlotte's Song
8. A Better World
9. Further Down Market
10. Lydian (Just Enough For The City)
