= Seven Worlds =

Studio album by Eric Johnson
- Released: November 6, 1998
- Recorded: 1976 – 1978
- Studios: Odyssey Sound Ltd. and Pecan Street Studios (Austin, Texas); Autumn Sound (Garland, Texas); Air Studios (London, UK)
- Genres: Rock, instrumental rock
- Length: 38:07
- Label: Ark 21
- Producer: Jay Aaron Podolnick

Eric Johnson chronology
G3: Live in Concert (1997)	Seven Worlds (1998)	Souvenir (2002)

Professional ratings
Review scores
Source	Rating
AllMusic	link

Seven Worlds is a 1998 solo album by Eric Johnson. It contains songs recorded between 1976 and 1978 – after disbanding with his previous band The Electromagnets – that were intended to be Johnson's first solo album. Due to various disputes, general release was held up until Johnson gave permission to Ark 21 to finally release the master recordings, more than twenty years after the album was recorded. The rights to the Seven Worlds recordings are owned by a previous manager. Johnson subsequently re-recorded the tracks "Zap" and "Emerald Eyes" for his first general release album, 1986's Tones.

== Track listing ==
All songs written by Eric Johnson, except where noted.

1. "Zap" – 3:22
2. "Emerald Eyes" (Johnson, Jay Aaron Podolnick) – 3:18
3. "Showdown" (Johnson, Jay Aaron Podolnick) – 3:59
4. "Missing Key" – 3:43
5. "Alone with You" – 6:13
6. "I Promise I Will Try" – 2:41
7. "Winter Came" – 4:56
8. "Turn the Page" – 3:49
9. "A Song for Life" – 2:29
10. "By Your Side" – 3:37

== Personnel ==
- Eric Johnson – guitars (1–5, 7, 8, 10), vocals (2–6, 8, 10), Fender Rhodes (2, 3), acoustic piano (2–5, 7, 8, 10), lap steel guitar (3, 6, 8), acoustic guitars (6, 9), electric guitars (6), bass (7)
- Stephen Barber – synthesizers (3)
- Jimmy Martin – guitar counterpart arrangement at end of chorus (8)
- Kyle Brock – bass (1, 2, 4, 5)
- David Dennard – bass (3), sitar (8)
- Roscoe Beck – bass (7, 8, 10)
- Bill Maddox – drums (1, 2, 4, 5, 7, 8)
- Mark Singer – drums (3, 10)
- Kim Wilson – harmonica (1, 5)
- Linda Wetherby – viola da gamba (4)
- Nick Phelps – trumpet (6), flutes (7)
- Jay Aaron – backing vocals (2, 10)
- Liza Farrow – backing vocals (3)
- Christopher Cross – backing vocals (4, 10)

=== Production ===
- Bill Ham – executive producer
- Jay Aaron Podolnick – producer, engineer, mixing, additional insert photography
- Greg Klinginsmith – assistant engineer
- Larson Lundahl – assistant engineer
- Phil York – assistant engineer
- Bob Ludwig – mastering at Gateway Mastering (Portland, Maine)
- Tom Wright – cover and band photography
- Jason Thompson – design, layout
