= Europe Live =

Live album by Eric Johnson
- Released: June 23, 2014
- Recorded: 2013
- Genre: Rock, instrumental rock
- Length: 70:35
- Label: Provogue
- Producer: Eric Johnson

Eric Johnson chronology
Bloom (2010)	Europe Live (2014)

Europe Live is Eric Johnson's fourth live album, released in 2014 by Provogue Records.

The album features Johnson, bassist Chris Maresh, and drummer Wayne Salzmann II.

== Track listing ==
All songs written by Eric Johnson, except where noted.

No.	Title	Writer(s)	Length
1.	"Intro"		1:54
2.	"Zenland"		4:22
3.	"Austin"		4:07
4.	"Forty Mile Town"		4:58
5.	"Mr. P.C."	(John Coltrane)	9:38
6.	"Manhattan"		4:50
7.	"Zap"		6:12
8.	"Song For Life"		3:01
9.	"Fatdaddy"		2:45
10.	"Last House On The Block"	(Eric Johnson, Bill Maddox)	11:32
11.	"Interlude"		2:00
12.	"Cliffs of Dover"		5:39
13.	"Evinrude Fever"		3:47
14.	"Sun Reprise"		5:49

== Personnel ==
Personnel are credited alphabetically.

- John Coltrane - Composer
- Max Crace - Graphic Design, Photography
- Kelly Donnelly - Mastering, Mixing
- Erin Franklin - Photography
- Eric Johnson - Composer, Guitar, Liner Notes, Primary Artist, Producer, Vocals
- Nick Landis - Mastering
- Ursula Le Guin - Photography
- Bill Maddox - Composer
- Chris Maresh - Guitar (Bass)
- Wayne Salzmann II - Drums, Vocals (Background)
- Dustin Sears - Bass Technician, Drum Technician
- Michael Stewart - Engineer, Tour Manager
- Peter van Leerdam - Engineer
- Bill Webb - Equipment Technician, Guitar Technician
