= Up Close (Eric Johnson album) =

Studio album by Eric Johnson
- Released: December 7, 2010
- Studio: Saucer Sound Studios (Austin, Texas)
- Genre: Rock, Instrumental rock
- Length: 51:12
- Label: EMI, Vortexan
- Producer: Eric Johnson; Richard Mullen; Jim Gaines

Eric Johnson chronology
Bloom (2005)	Up Close (2010)	Eclectic (2014)

Up Close is Eric Johnson's sixth studio album, released on December 7, 2010. It is Johnson's first studio release since his 2005 album Bloom. The album features guest appearances by Malford Milligan, Sonny Landreth, Steve Miller, Jimmie Vaughan, and Jonny Lang.

== Track listing ==
All songs written by Eric Johnson, except where noted.

No.	Title	Writer(s)	Length
1.	"Awaken"		1:05
2.	"Fatdaddy"		2:44
3.	"Brilliant Room" (featuring Malford Milligan)		3:53
4.	"Texas" (featuring Steve Miller and Jimmie Vaughan; The Electric Flag song)	Mike Bloomfield, Buddy Miles	6:02
5.	"Gem"		4:09
6.	"Traverse"		1:18
7.	"Austin" (featuring Jonny Lang)		4:01
8.	"Soul Surprise"		6:11
9.	"On the Way"		3:09
10.	"Arithmetic"		4:32
11.	"The Sea and the Mountain"		1:50
12.	"Vortexan"		3:04
13.	"A Change Has Come to Me"		5:19
14.	"Change (Revisited)"		1:39
15.	"Your Book" (featuring Sonny Landreth)		4:15

== Personnel ==
Musicians and Vocalists

- Eric Johnson – guitars, Coral sitar (1), bass (1, 6, 8, 9, 11–14), percussion (1), vocals (3, 5, 10, 13, 15), lap steel guitar (3, 7, 10), radio and TV noises (3), acoustic piano (7, 8, 10, 13, 15), electric piano (7), acoustic guitar (8, 9, 15), voice (8), 6-string bass (9), Hammond B3 organ (10), fuzz radio (14)
- Red Young – Hammond B3 organ (3, 7, 13–15)
- Oliver Rajamani – sarod (1), sitar (1), tablas (1), vocals (1), rubab (1)
- Jimmie Vaughan – guitars (4)
- Steven Hennig – guitars (9)
- Sonny Landreth – guitars (15)
- Chris Maresh – bass (2)
- Kyle Brock – bass (3)
- Roscoe Beck – bass (4, 5, 7, 9, 10, 15)
- Kevin Hall – drums (2)
- Barry "Frosty" Smith – drums (15)
- Tommy Taylor – percussion (1, 6, 11), drums (3–5, 7–10, 12–14)
- Thomas Burritt – percussion (1, 6, 11, 13, 14)
- James Fenner – percussion (3, 5, 7, 8, 10)
- Brad Evilsizer – percussion (15)
- Jason Eskridge – backing vocals (3, 7, 10, 13–15)
- Malford Milligan – vocals (3)
- Steve Miller – vocals (4)
- Jonny Lang – vocals (7)

Arrangements

- Roscoe Beck
- Eric Johnson
- Richard Mullen
- Tommy Taylor

=== Production ===
- Eric Johnson – producer, mixing (1, 6, 11, 15)
- Richard Mullen – assistant producer, engineer (3–15), mixing (4, 5, 8)
- Jim Gaines – producer (13)
- Kelly Donnelly – engineer (1–3, 6, 7, 9–15), mixing (1, 6, 11, 15)
- Andy Johns – mixing (2, 3, 7, 9, 10, 12–14)
- Gary Paczosa – mixing (10)
- Jim Wilson – mastering at Airshow Mastering (Boulder, Colorado)
- Kelly Ian Toombs – packaging design
- Park Street – photography
