= Kings of Sleep =

Studio album by Stuart Hamm
- Released: June 19, 1989
- Recorded: December 1988 – February 1989
- Genre: Instrumental Rock
- Length: 39:05
- Label: Relativity
- Producer: Stuart Hamm

Stuart Hamm chronology
Radio Free Albemuth (1988)	Kings of Sleep (1989)	The Urge (1991)

Professional ratings
Review scores
Source	Rating
Allmusic	4.5/5 stars

Kings of Sleep is the second solo album released by bassist Stuart Hamm. It was released on June 19, 1989 on Relativity Records.

The title of the album and many of the songs were inspired by the novels and short stories of William Gibson, including Neuromancer ("Black Ice" and "Terminal Beach" are both references from that novel), Count Zero (referring to the name of the novel as well as the hacker handle of one of the protagonists), and the short story The Winter Market (Kings of Sleep is the name of a fictional stim-album in that story).

== Track listing ==
All songs written by Stuart Hamm, except where noted.

1. "Black Ice" – 4:23
2. "Surely the Best" – 5:19
3. "Call of the Wild" – 4:41
4. "Terminal Beach" – 3:57
5. "Count Zero" – 4:13
6. "I Want to Know" – 5:39
7. "Prelude in C" (J.S. Bach) – 2:30
8. "Kings of Sleep" (Kim Bullard & Stuart Hamm) – 8:23

== Personnel ==
- Stuart Hamm - bass guitar
- Harry Cody - electric guitar ("Surely the Best", "Call of the Wild", "Count Zero" & "Kings of Sleep")
- Buzzy Feiten - electric guitar ("Black Ice" & "I Want to Know")
- Jonathan Mover - drums
- Amy Knoles - percussions
- Scott Collard - Keyboards
- Dick Zimmerman - photography
- David Bett - art direction
