= Eclectic (Eric Johnson and Mike Stern album) =

Studio album by Eric Johnson and Mike Stern
- Released: October 27, 2014
- Studio: Saucer Sound Studios and Studio Plush (Austin, Texas)
- Genre: Rock, instrumental rock, jazz fusion
- Length: 72:18
- Label: Concord, Vortexan, Heads Up
- Producer: Eric Johnson

Eric Johnson chronology
Up Close (2010)	Eclectic (2014)	EJ (2016)

Mike Stern chronology
All Over the Place (2012)	Eclectic (2014)	Trip (2017)

Eclectic is collaborative album between American guitarists Eric Johnson and Mike Stern. It was released on October 27, 2014. It was Johnson's first studio release since his 2010 album Up Close. The album features guest appearances by Malford Milligan and Christopher Cross.

== Track listing ==
All songs written by Eric Johnson and Mike Stern, except where noted.

No.	Title	Writer(s)	Length
1.	"Roll With It"		5:23
2.	"Remember"		6:27
3.	"Benny Man's Blues"		3:53
4.	"Wishing Well"		6:02
5.	"Big Foot (With Intro)"	Chris Maresh	7:07
6.	"Tidal"		5:27
7.	"You Never Know"		6:41
8.	"Dry ice"	Bill Maddox	6:51
9.	"Sometimes"		8:07
10.	"Hullabaloo"		3:11
11.	"Wherever You Go (With Intro)"		6:06
12.	"Red House"	Jimi Hendrix	4:51

== Personnel ==
- Eric Johnson – acoustic piano, synthesizers, guitars, vocals (12)
- Mike Stern – guitars, verse vocals (4), vocals (12)
- Chris Maresh – acoustic bass, electric bass
- Anton Fig – drums, percussion

Guest musicians and vocalists

- Malford Milligan – vocals (1)
- Christopher Cross – bridge vocals (4)
- Leni Stern – ngoni (5, 11), vocals (5), vocal intro (11)
- Wayne Salzmann II – percussion (2)
- James Fenner – percussion (4)
- John Mills – saxophones ("Hullabaloo")
- Mike Mordecai – trombone ("Hullabaloo")
- Andrew Johnson – trumpet ("Hullabaloo")
- Guy Forsyth – harmonica (12)

=== Production ===
- Eric Johnson – producer
- Kelly Donnelly – recording, mixing
- Josh Johnson – assistant engineer
- Paul Blakemore – mastering at CMG Mastering (Cleveland, Ohio)
- Andrew Pham – package design
- Max Crace – photography

== Charts ==
Chart performance for Eclectic
Chart (2014)	Peak position
UK Jazz & Blues Albums (OCC)	28
US Top Jazz Albums (Billboard)	3
