= Radio Free Albemuth (album) =

Studio album by Stuart Hamm
- Released: 1988
- Recorded: 1988
- Genre: Progressive rock, instrumental rock, jazz fusion
- Length: 37:16
- Label: Relativity
- Producer: Stuart Hamm

Stuart Hamm chronology
Radio Free Albemuth (1988)	Kings of Sleep (1989)

Professional ratings
Review scores
Source	Rating
Allmusic	4.5/5 stars

Radio Free Albemuth is the debut solo album by bassist Stuart Hamm, released in 1988 on Relativity Records. An energetic instrumental fusion album, Hamm is backed up by keyboardist Scott Collard and drummer Mike Barsimanto, with guitarist Joe Satriani guesting on three tracks, and Allan Holdsworth (SynthAxe) and Tommy Mars (keyboards) playing on the title track. The title of the album and many of the songs were inspired by the novels of Philip K. Dick.

== Track listing ==
All tracks are written by Stuart Hamm, except where noted.

No.	Title	Writer(s)	Length
1.	"Radio Free Albemuth"		5:10
2.	"Flow My Tears"		8:23
3.	"Dr. Gradus Ad Parnasum"	Claude Debussy	3:05
4.	"Sexually Active"		7:51
5.	"Simple Dreams"		4:05
6.	"Country Music (A Night in Hell)"		3:45
7.	"Moonlight Sonata"	Beethoven	4:54
Total length:			37:16

== Personnel ==
- Stuart Hamm – bass guitar, production
- Allan Holdsworth – SynthAxe on "Radio Free Albemuth"
- Joe Satriani – electric guitar on "Radio Free Albemuth", "Flow My Tears" and "Sexually Active"
- Mike Barsimanto – drums
- Amy Knoles – percussion on "Radio Free Albemuth"
- Scott Collard – keyboards
- Glen Freundl – keyboards on "Radio Free Albemuth", "Sexually Active" and "Country Music"
- Tommy Mars – keyboards on "Radio Free Albemuth"
- Charles Hamm – front cover photo
- Mark Effords – back cover photo
- David Bett – design
