= Venus Isle =

Studio album by Eric Johnson
- Released: September 3, 1996
- Recorded: 1996
- Studio: Saucer Sound Studios and Arlyn Studios (Austin, Texas); Digital Services and Rocket Ranch (Houston, Texas); Reelsound (Buda, Texas); A&M Studios and Ocean Way Recording (Hollywood, California); Record One (Sherman Oaks, California)
- Genre: Instrumental rock, pop rock
- Length: 58:23
- Label: Capitol
- Producer: Eric Johnson; Richard Mullen

Eric Johnson chronology
Ah Via Musicom (1990)	Venus Isle (1996)	G3: Live in Concert (1996)

Singles from Ah Via Musicom
- 1. "Pavilion" / "S.R.V." Released: 1996

Venus Isle is the third studio album by guitarist Eric Johnson, released on September 3, 1996, through Capitol Records. The album reached No. 51 on the U.S. Billboard 200, the highest position in Johnson's career, and remained on that chart for six weeks. "Pavilion" was released as a single and reached No. 33 on Billboard's Mainstream Rock chart, while its B-side "S.R.V." is a tribute to guitarist Stevie Ray Vaughan and features his elder brother Jimmie Vaughan as a guest soloist. "Camel's Night Out" is featured as downloadable content for the video game Guitar Hero World Tour (2008) and can also be exported to Guitar Hero 5 (2009).

The album's original title was to be Travel One Hope, but this was changed at the last minute by Capitol for "being too oblique." Advance promotional CDs of Travel One Hope have since become a collector's item.

== Critical reception ==
Professional ratings
Review scores
Source	Rating
AllMusic	3/5 stars

Stephen Thomas Erlewine at AllMusic gave Venus Isle three stars out of five, describing Johnson as a "consummate guitarist" and "a joy to hear him play". However, he criticized the album for not breaking any new ground following the six-year gap from its 1990 predecessor Ah Via Musicom, remarking that it "reveals no new insights about the guitarist, it only offers a new spin on the territory Ah! Via Musicom covered."

== Track listing ==
All tracks are written by Eric Johnson, except where noted.

No.	Title	Length
1.	"Venus Isle"	5:29
2.	"Battle We Have Won"	5:59
3.	"All About You"	8:20
4.	"S.R.V."	3:02
5.	"Lonely in the Night" (Vince Mariani)	6:05
6.	"Manhattan"	4:52
7.	"Camel's Night Out" (Kyle Brock, Mark Younger-Smith)	5:16
8.	"Song for Lynette"	4:54
9.	"When the Sun Meets the Sky" (Johnson, Steve Barber)	7:54
10.	"Pavilion"	5:02
11.	"Venus Reprise"	1:30
Total length:		58:23

== Personnel ==
Musicians

- Eric Johnson – vocals (1–3, 5, 9), acoustic piano (1–3, 5, 6, 8, 9, 11), guitars (1–7, 9–11), guitar synthesizer (1, 5, 10), lap steel guitar (1, 2, 9), synthesizers (2, 3, 8), classical guitar (8)
- Steve Barber – synthesizers (1–5, 8–10), Hammond B3 organ (4, 6), string arrangements (5, 8)
- Jimmie Vaughan – guitar solos (4)
- Kyle Brock – bass (1, 2, 4, 5–7, 10)
- Roscoe Beck – bass (3, 9–11)
- Chris Maresh – bass (8)
- Tommy Taylor – drums (1–7, 9–11), percussion (3, 11)
- Bill Maddox – drums (8)
- James Fenner – percussion (2, 5, 6)
- Chris Searles – percussion (3, 5)
- Jennifer Bourianoff – strings (5)
- Richard Kilmer – strings (5)
- Anthony Stogner – strings (5)
- Bruce Williams – strings (5)
- Scott McIntosh – trumpet (8)
- Amit Chatterjee – vocal introduction (1), additional vocals (3)
- Christopher Cross – additional vocals (3, 5, 9)

Music arrangements

- Steve Barber
- Kyle Brock
- Eric Johnson
- Vince Mariani
- Tommy Taylor

Production

- Cinema Records, Inc. – executive producers
- Eric Johnson – producer, additional engineer
- Richard Mullen – producer, engineer, mixing
- John Aguto – additional engineer
- Roscoe Beck – additional engineer
- John Fannin – additional engineer
- Mark Hallman – additional engineer
- Malcolm Harper – additional engineer
- Ethridge Hill – additional engineer
- James Hoover – additional engineer
- Bill Maddox – additional engineer
- John Moran – additional engineer
- Jeff Poe – additional engineer
- Stuart Sullivan – additional engineer
- Jim Champagne – mix assistant
- Jeff DeMorris – mix assistant
- Brad Haehnel – mix assistant
- Allen Sides – mix assistant
- Rail Rogut – Pro Tools editing
- Daryl Dunn – digital sampling
- Duncan Black – studio technician
- Larry Greenhill – studio technician
- Bill Johnson – studio technician
- Greg Klinginsmith – studio technician
- Terry McGuire – studio technician
- Bernie Grundman – mastering at Bernie Grundman Mastering (Hollywood, California)
- Jimmy McKeever – mastering assistant
- Max Crace – design, photography, illustration, all digital imaging
- Park Street – additional gatefold photography
- Gay Crace – model for angel cover illustration
- Vince Mariani – lettering, liner notes
- Joe Priesnitz – management

== Chart performance ==
=== Album ===
Year	Chart	Position
1996	Billboard 200	51

=== Singles ===
Year	Title	Chart	Position
1996	"Pavilion"	Billboard Mainstream Rock	33
