= The Urge (album) =

Studio album by Stuart Hamm
- Released: June 4, 1991
- Genre: Instrumental rock
- Length: 50:59
- Label: Relativity
- Producer: Stuart Hamm

Stuart Hamm chronology
Kings of Sleep (1989)	The Urge (1991)	Outbound (2000)

Professional ratings
Review scores
Source	Rating
Allmusic	3/5 stars

The Urge is the third solo album released by bassist Stuart Hamm, released in 1991. It was the first of Hamm's solo albums to feature vocals, and included guest appearances by guitarist Eric Johnson and Tommy Lee of Mötley Crüe. The song "Quahogs Anyone?" was recorded live at Santa Barbara on September 27, 1990.

Hamm's signature Fender bass guitar was also called "The Urge", and was followed by "The Urge II".

== Track listing ==
1. "Welcome to My World" – 1:36
2. "The Hammer" – 4:53
3. "Who Do You Want Me to Be Today?" – 6:07
4. "If You're Scared, Stay Home!" – 5:32
5. "Our Dreams" – 6:05
6. "Lone Star" – 7:24
7. "Quahogs Anyone? (119, 120 Whatever It Takes)" – 6:12
8. "The Urge" – 7:09
9. "As Children" – 6:01

== Personnel ==
- Stuart Hamm - Bass guitar, Piccolo Bass, Vocals, Background Vocals and Keyboards
- Eric Johnson - Electric Guitar on "Our Dreams" and "Lone Star"
- Harry K. Cody - Electric Guitar
- Buzzy Feiten - Electric Guitar and Additional Vocals
- Dawayne Bailey - Electric Guitar
- Steve Recker - Electric Guitar
- Micajah Ryan - Acoustic Guitar on "Our Dreams", Background Vocals, Mixing, Engineering
- Jonathan Mover - Drums and Additional Vocals
- Steve Smith - Drums
- Tommy Mars - Background Vocals
- Steve Madero Horns - Background Vocals, Additional Vocals
- Tommy Lee - Additional Vocals
- Tanya Papanicolas - Whisper
- Shawn Berman - Vocals, Samples, Engineering Assistance
- Bob Arkin - Additional Vocals
- Bruce Hamm - Additional Vocals
- Emily Ryan - Additional Vocals
- Dan Goldberg - Additional Vocals
- Jorge Bermudez - Additional Vocals, Percussion
- Chris Hamm - Vocal Chant
- Greg Fulginiti - Mastering
- Lori Stoll - Cover Photography
- Mark Leiloha - Live Photography
- David Bett - Art Direction
- Stuart Hamm - Producer
