= Live and Beyond =

Live album by Alien Love Child
- Released: October 2000
- Recorded: January 2000, Texas
- Genre: Instrumental Rock/Blues
- Label: Favored Nations
- Producer: Eric Johnson and Richard Mullen

Professional ratings
Review scores
Source	Rating
Allmusic	link

Live And Beyond is the first, live album by Eric Johnson's side-project Alien Love Child. The album was recorded in 2000, Texas and features Chris Maresh on bass guitar and Bill Maddox on drums with guest vocals by Malford Milligan. It also features one studio recorded track, "World of Trouble". The song "Rain" written by Chris Maresh was nominated for a Grammy Award for Best Pop Instrumental Performance in 2002.

== Track listing ==
1. "Zenland" (Johnson) – 5:53
2. "Last House On The Block" (Johnson/Maddox) – 11:13
3. "Rain" (Maresh) – 4:08
4. "Enzo Shuffle" (Johnson) – 3:01
5. "Once A Part Of Me" (Johnson) – 7:16
6. "Don't Cha Know" (Jimmie Vaughan) – 3:53
7. "The Boogie King (tribute to John Lee Hooker)" (Johnson) – 4:29
8. "Elevator Sky Movie" (Johnson) – 2:34
9. "Shape I'm In" (Johnson) – 5:35
10. "World of Trouble" (Johnson) – 3:40

== Personnel ==
- Eric Johnson - Guitar, vocals, Piano
- Chris Maresh - Bass guitar, vocals, Bass Keys
- Bill Maddox - drums
- Stephen Barber - Hammond B3 Organ
- Malford Milligan - vocals
