= Storyville (band) =

American blues rock band

- Origin: Austin, Texas, U.S.
- Genres: Blues rock
- Years active: 1994–2012
- Labels: Atlantic Records; November Records
- Past members: Malford Milligan; David Grissom; David Lee Holt; Tommy Shannon; Chris Layton; Craig Ross

Storyville was an American blues-rock band formed in 1993 in Austin, Texas, U.S. Drummer Chris Layton and bassist Tommy Shannon, former members of Arc Angels and the rhythm section for Stevie Ray Vaughan's band Double Trouble, formed the band with Craig Ross, David Lee Holt and David Grissom after a jam session at Antone's. After releasing an album on November Records in 1993, the band won a total of nine Austin Music awards; they became stalwarts on the local music scene and toured nationally. Malford Milligan replaced Ross in 1993. They subsequently signed to major label Atlantic Records, for whom they recorded two albums before breaking up. The single "Born Without You", from their 1998 release Dog Years, reached No. 28 on the Billboard Mainstream Rock chart.

== Members ==
- Malford Milligan – lead vocals
- David Grissom – guitar/vocals
- David Lee Holt - guitar/vocals
- Tommy Shannon – bass
- Chris Layton – drums

== Discography ==
- Bluest Eyes - November Records, 1993
- A Piece of Your Soul - Atlantic Records, 1996 U.S. Blues No. 5
- Dog Years - Atlantic Records, 1998 U.S. Heatseekers No. 47
- Live At Antones - Storyville Records, 2007

== See also ==
- Music of Austin
