= Xotic =

2011 video game

- Steam header
- Developer: WXP Games
- Publishers: WXP Games (PC); Valcon Games (X360)
- Directors: Lyndon Sumner; Patrick Moynihan
- Producer: Dan Dixon
- Designers: Lyndon Sumner; Martin Ishihara
- Platforms: Microsoft Windows; Xbox 360
- Release: Windows; September 16, 2011; Xbox 360; November 16, 2011
- Genre: First-person shooter
- Modes: Single-player, multiplayer

Xotic is an indie action-shooter developed by WXP Games and published by Valcon Games. The game was released for Microsoft Windows on September 16, 2011, via Steam and on November 16, 2011, for the Xbox 360. A Desura release came later on February 12, 2012.

== Gameplay ==
After existing as a non-corporeal energy being for eternity, an ancient entity known as The Orb has gone rogue. The Orb is lonely and longs for a body. Infuriated, it embarks on a galactic massacre, taking over species and obliterating planets that have the alluring, red-glowing toxins known as scabs. As a warrior genetically engineered to battle The Orb, the player assumes the role of the antagonist of the game.

Every level has rows and groups of red blobs known as "scabs" (featured in the cover art) that, when hit, burst one after the other to maintain a chain bar that is used for "terraforming." The player's chain multiplier and final score will increase the longer they shoot other scabs to keep this bar from lowering to zero.

The story exposition is hammered significantly by the voice-over narrative - which is forced through a filter attempting to give it a futuristic sound but, at the same time, makes it more difficult to decipher what's being said. The game also includes leaderboards so players can compare their skills with friends.

== Reception ==
Reception

Aggregate score
Aggregator	Score	
Aggregator	PC	Xbox 360
Metacritic	67/100	52/100

Review scores
Publication	Score	
Publication	PC	Xbox 360
Destructoid	8/10	N/A
GamesMaster	N/A	6.5/10
GameSpot	6.5/10	6/10
IGN	N/A	3/10
Official Xbox Magazine (UK)	N/A	7/10
Official Xbox Magazine (US)	N/A	4.5/10
Game Rant	N/A	2.5/5

Xotic received "mixed or average" reviews, according to review aggregator Metacritic.

Destructoid stated that "Xotic demands a certain competitive mindset to fully enjoy it, to be sure, but for those who want to test their first-person skills with the type of score-based arcade gameplay that is usually found in other genres, it does what it sets out to do and it does so successfully without overwhelming the player."

Brett Todd for GameSpot stated that "The PC and Xbox 360 versions of the game are nearly identical, although there are some differences when it comes to controls. The 360 edition has issues with imprecise movement and overly twitchy aiming." He also said that "The distinctive look, alien level design, and hallucinogenic story and setting are the biggest pluses in Xotic."
