= Souvenir (Eric Johnson album) =

Compilation album by Eric Johnson
- Released: January 13, 2003
- Recorded: 1973 – 2002
- Genre: Rock
- Label: Vortexan
- Producer: Eric Johnson

Eric Johnson chronology
Seven Worlds (1998)	Souvenir (2003)	Bloom (2005)

Professional ratings
Review scores
Source	Rating
Allmusic	4/5 stars

Souvenir is an album by Eric Johnson released in 2003. It is a collection of previously unreleased material spanning 25 years. The album was unique in that it was only available for purchase through Eric Johnson's website. The album was released between Seven Worlds in 1998 and Bloom in 2005.

== Track listing ==
All songs written by Eric Johnson except where noted.

1. "Get to Go" – 4:47
2. "Space of Clouds" – 2:49
3. "Paperback Writer" (John Lennon, Paul McCartney) – 4:06
4. "Forever Yours" – 4:12
5. "Hard Times" – 3:00
6. "Climbing from Inside" – 3:31
7. "I'm Finding You" – 4:25
8. "Paladin" – 3:08
9. "Fanfare One" – 1:58
10. "Virginia" – 4:12
11. "A Memory I Have" – 2:47
12. "Dusty" – 1:23
