= Eric Johnson (guitarist) =

American guitarist and composer (born 1954)

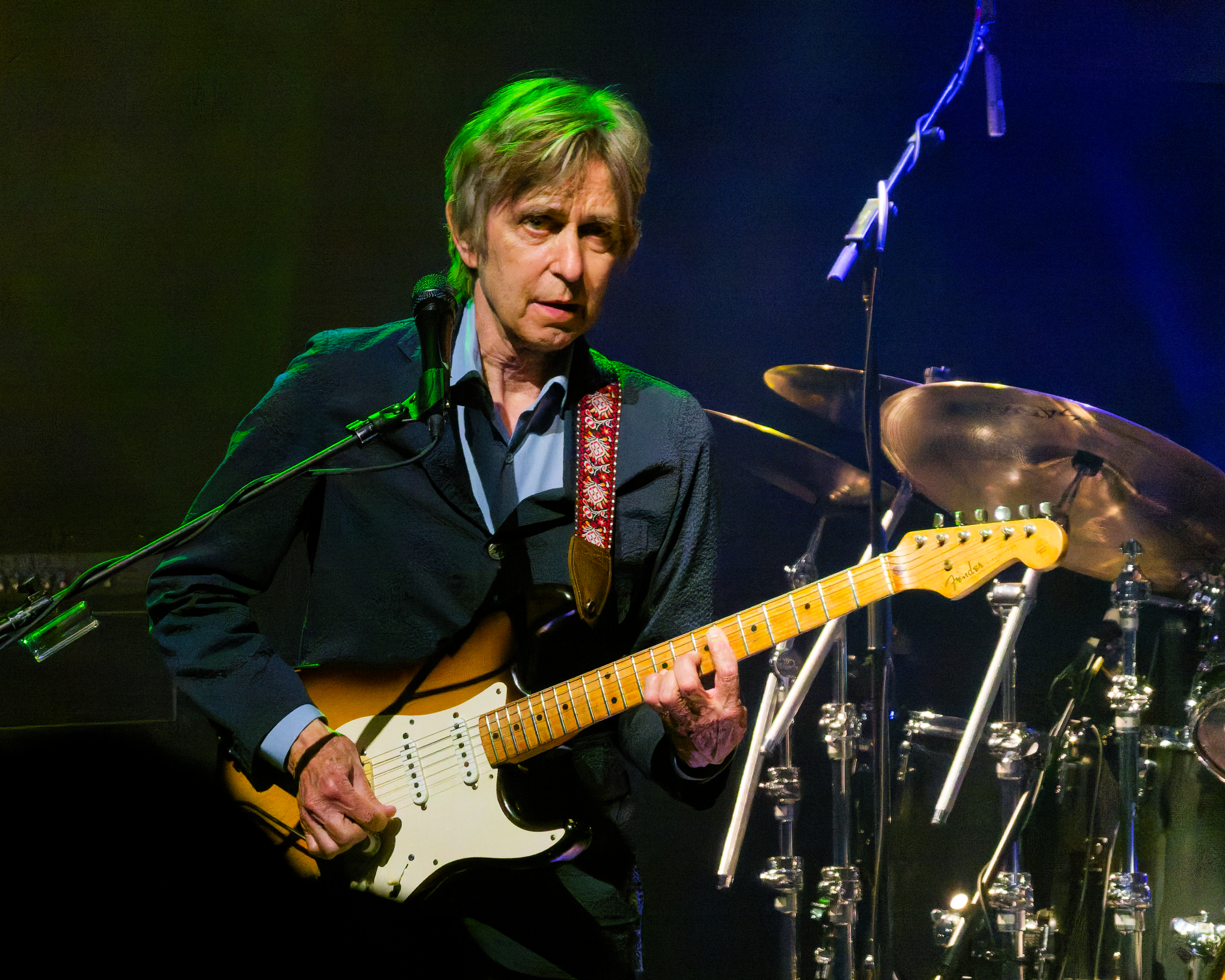
- Johnson in 2026

Background information
- Born: August 17, 1954 (age 72); Austin, Texas, U.S.
- Genres: Rock; instrumental rock; jazz fusion; blues; country
- Occupations: Musician; singer; songwriter; producer
- Instruments: Guitar; vocals; piano; bass
- Years active: 1969–present
- Labels: Reprise; Capitol; Epic; Warner Bros.; Favored Nations; Ark21; EMI; Concord; Blue Élan
- Member of: Electromagnets
- Formerly of: Alien Love Child
- Website: www.ericjohnson.com

Eric Johnson (born August 17, 1954) is an American guitarist, vocalist and composer. His 1990 album Ah Via Musicom was certified platinum by the RIAA, and the single "Cliffs of Dover" won the Grammy Award for Best Rock Instrumental Performance.

Best known for his electric guitar skills, Johnson is also a player of acoustic, lap steel, and resonator guitar, as well as a bassist, pianist, and vocalist. He plays many musical genres, including rock, blues, jazz fusion, soul, folk, new-age, classical, and country. Keyboard called him "one of the most respected guitarists on the planet" in 2006.

== Music career ==
=== Early life ===
Eric Johnson was born on August 17th, 1954 in Austin, Texas. He was born into a musically inclined family. His mom was a pianist and Johnson and his three sisters studied piano, while his father was a whistling enthusiast who loved music. Johnson started learning the guitar at age 11 and rapidly progressed while listening to the musicians who would heavily influence his future style, including Mike Bloomfield, Chet Atkins, Eric Clapton, Jimi Hendrix, Ric Bailey, Wes Montgomery, Jerry Reed, Bob Dylan, and Django Reinhardt, among others. At the age of 15, he joined his first professional band, Mariani, a psychedelic rock group. In 1970, Johnson and the group recorded a demonstration, which had an extremely limited release. The recording became a prized collector's item years later.

=== Early bands ===
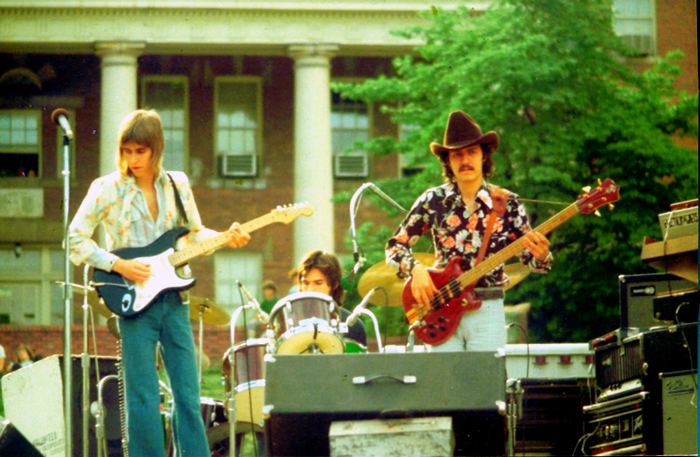
The Electromagnets with Johnson (left) performing at North Carolina State University in Raleigh, North Carolina, 1976

After graduating from high school, Johnson briefly attended the University of Texas at Austin and traveled with his family to Africa. He eventually returned to Austin, and in 1974, joined a local fusion group called Electromagnets. The group toured and recorded regionally, but did not attract attention from major record labels and disbanded in 1977. The strength of Johnson's playing, however, attracted a small cult following to the group's early recordings, and decades later, their two albums were given wide release on compact disc.

=== Seven Worlds ===
Following the Electromagnets' demise, Johnson formed a touring trio, the Eric Johnson Group, with drummer Bill Maddox and bassist Kyle Brock. They played to audiences around Austin. From 1976–1978, Johnson recorded Seven Worlds, his debut album, at Odyssey Studios in Austin. Contract disputes followed, and Seven Worlds was not released until 1998 on Ark21 Records.

Unable to secure a new management contract, Johnson began working as a session guitarist for some well-known acts, including Cat Stevens, Carole King, and Christopher Cross. While a session musician, Johnson continued to perform locally in Austin.

Johnson's career rebounded in 1984 when he was signed to Warner Bros. Records. Christopher Cross and producer David Tickle recommended Johnson to the label. His breakthrough appearance at Austin City Limits on July 31, 1984, was recorded and later released on CD/DVD in 2010. The performance of "Cliffs of Dover" from the concert was distributed in a flexi-disc soundpage in the May 1986 issue of Guitar Player magazine.

=== Tones and Ah Via Musicom ===
In May 1986, Guitar Player magazine ran a cover story about Johnson. The article helped promote the release of Tones and brought Johnson critical praise, as well as elevating his profile in the guitar and music community. The album's track "Zap" was nominated for the 1987 Grammy Award for Best Rock Instrumental Performance, but as a whole, the album did not sell well, and Warner Bros. let Johnson's contract expire. He signed on with indie label Cinema Records, distributed by Capitol Records.

By the time Johnson released his 1990 Capitol Records debut album, Ah Via Musicom, he was regularly winning awards for his musicianship in the guitar press. During this period, Johnson also drew recognition for the rich, violin-like lead sound he coaxed from his beloved 1954 Fender Stratocaster, which he named Virginia. The album's second track, "Cliffs of Dover", exemplified his unique sound and won Johnson a 1992 Grammy Award for Best Rock Instrumental Performance. Ah Via Musicom was a crossover hit and was certified platinum.

=== Venus Isle ===
Johnson is an admitted perfectionist, and those traits seemed to work against the Ah Via Musicom follow-up release. Unhappy with his recordings, Johnson mastered, then later scrapped several completed tracks for the new album and delayed its release for three years, on top of the three years he had spent touring in support of Ah Via Musicom. He also had setbacks involving musical growth and personal issues while recording his next album Venus Isle.

Venus Isle was released on September 3, 1996. It was an album with world influences that demonstrated Johnson's growth as a guitarist, songwriter, producer, musical arranger, and vocalist, but the album received mixed reviews and did not match the success of its predecessor. As a result, Johnson was dropped from Capitol Records. He rebounded with a successful tour from October to November 1996 with fellow guitarists Joe Satriani and Steve Vai. Named the "G3" tour, it resulted in a platinum-selling compact disc and DVD titled G3: Live in Concert.

=== Solo albums in the 2000s ===
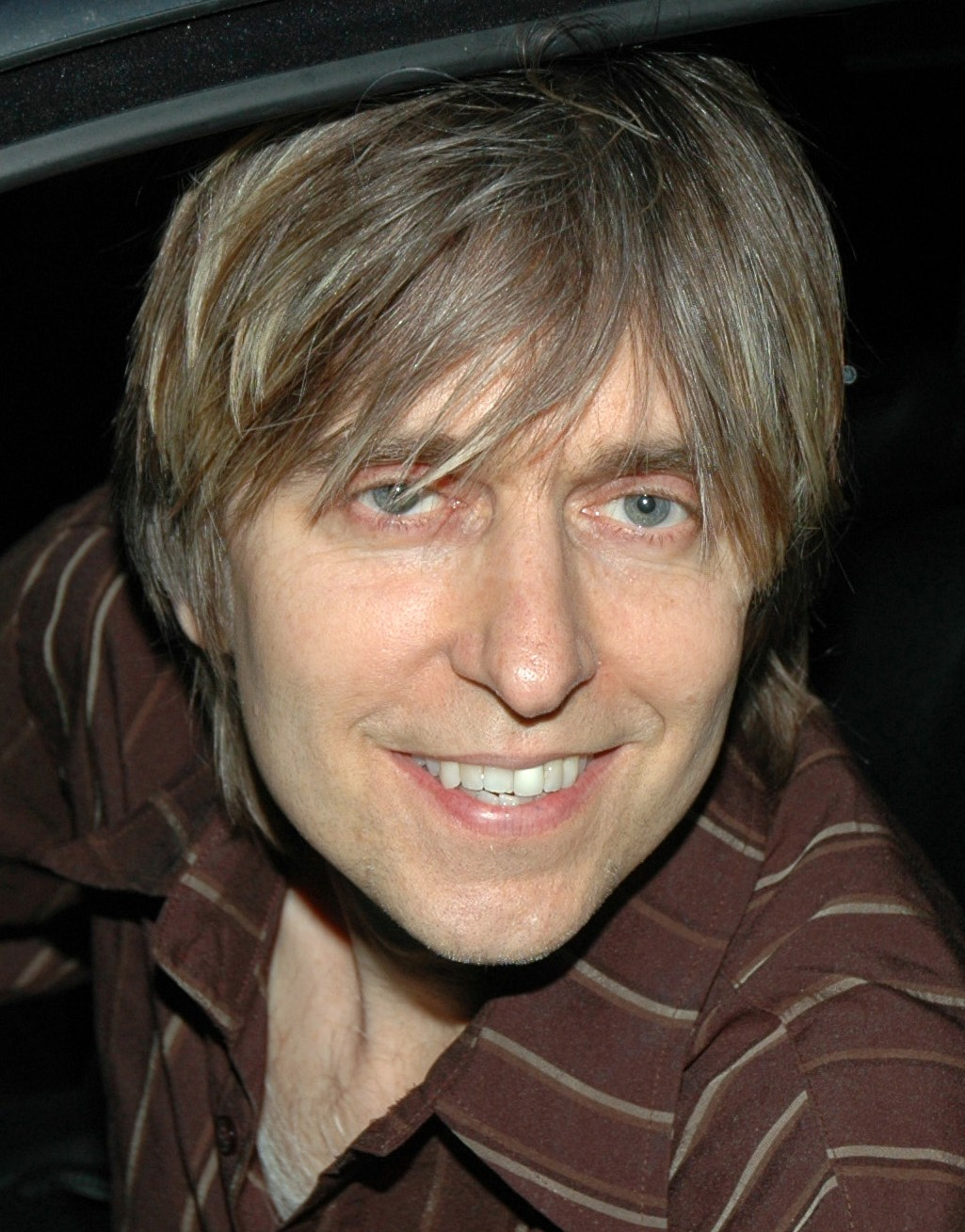
Johnson in 2007

Johnson eventually returned to the recording studio, releasing Souvenir in January 2003 on his own Vortexan Records label. The album, released on the Internet, received nearly 65,000 plays in the first seven weeks after it was made available on mp3.com. Johnson promoted Souvenir with an electric tour in 2003 and an acoustic tour in 2004.

Johnson's album Bloom was released in June 2005, on Vai's Favored Nations label. The album was divided into three sections with different musical styles, intended to showcase Johnson's versatility. His December 1988 Austin City Limits performance was released on both DVD and compact disc on New West Records in November 2005. His instructional guitar DVD, The Art of Guitar (Hal Leonard Corporation), was also released at the end of 2005.

On June 24, 2014, Provogue Records released Europe Live, a retrospective of Johnson's work that features two new compositions. One of the new compositions is entitled "Evinrude Fever" and draws inspiration from water skiing and boating.

=== Other projects ===
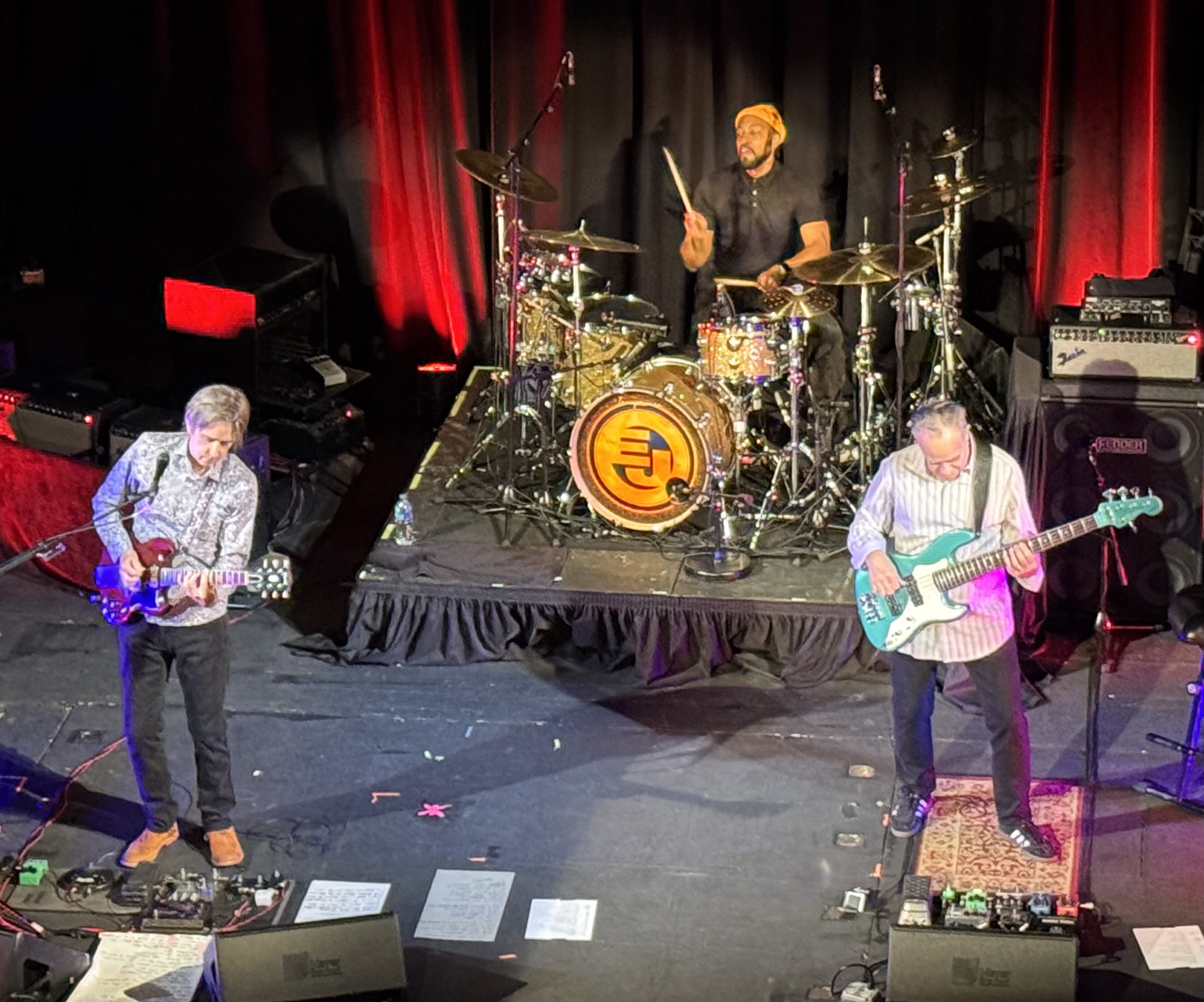
Johnson (left) performing with drummer Brannen Temple (center) and bassist Roscoe Beck (right) in Phoenixville, Pennsylvania, 2025

In 1991, Johnson contributed guitar for two tracks on Stuart Hamm's album, The Urge. In 1994, he formed a side project called Alien Love Child and played shows sporadically while recording Venus Isle. The positive fan feedback from the shows made Alien Love Child a permanent gig. A live performance recording, Live and Beyond, was released in 2000 on Steve Vai's Favored Nations label. Alien Love Child featured the vocal prowess of Malford Milligan, an Austin-area musician who fronted the local band Storyville, made up of members of Stevie Ray Vaughan's Double Trouble.

In 1998, Johnson was among the judges in Musician magazine's "Best Unsigned Bands" competition, along with Ani DiFranco, Moby, Art Alexakis of Everclear, Keb' Mo', and Joe Perry of Aerosmith.

In 2003, he contributed a guitar solo on Mike Tramp's solo album, More to Life than This. The solo was featured on the track "The Good, the Sad and the Ugly".

In September 2006, Johnson took part in a theatrical production titled Primal Twang: The Legacy of the Guitar, an "exciting cinematic journey through the guitar's colorful and surprisingly controversial 3500-year history". In September 2007, Johnson participated in a second theatrical production by the same company titled Love In: A Musical Celebration in which he performed a Jimi Hendrix set, a tribute to the year 1967, often called "The Summer of Love".

In late 2006, he participated in a second G3 tour in South America with Joe Satriani and John Petrucci.

Johnson appeared as part of Guitar Player magazine's Ultimate Musician's Fantasy Camp in Las Vegas in February 2014, with guitarists Joe Perry, Steve Vai, Elliot Easton, Michael Anthony, and others. He appeared with Zakk Wylde, Buddy Guy, Jonny Lang, Kenny Wayne Shepherd, Dweezil Zappa, and Doyle Bramhall II as part of the eighth edition of the Experience Hendrix Tour highlighting the music of Jimi Hendrix, in March 2014. Johnson returned to the Experience Hendrix Tour in September and October 2014. Johnson and fellow guitarist Mike Stern kicked off their Eclectic Guitar Tour on November 6, 2014, and released an album supporting it on October 27, 2014. In August 2015, he participated in the "Vai Academy" along with guitarists Steve Vai and Sonny Landreth, and also kicked off an acoustic tour of the Southwest.

In 2016, he released EJ: Explorations on Guitar and Piano, which was his first entirely acoustic album. He toured the album in early 2017.

In 2017, Johnson released Collage, which also coincided with the announcement of a tour revisiting his hit album Ah Via Musicom.

In the fall of 2018, he was invited to promote the Fender and Nissan collaboration for car stereo systems designed by Fender Audio.

In January 2020, Johnson released EJ: Volume II, which was a follow-up to his first acoustic album.

On September 12, 2023, Johnson was announced as a part of the G3 2024 Tour along with Steve Vai and Joe Satriani.

== Personnel ==
Current members

- Eric Johnson – lead vocals, guitars (1969–present)
- Daniel Kimbro – bass guitar (2026–present)
- Tal Bergman – drums, percussion (2026–present)

Former members

- Kyle Brock – bass guitar
- Bill Maddox – drums, percussion
- Tommy Taylor – drums, percussion, vocals
- Roscoe Beck – bass guitar
- Stephen Barber – piano, synthesizers
- David Tickle – synthesizers, percussion
- Jerry Marotta – percussion, vocals
- Chris Maresh – bass guitar
- Mike Stern – guitars, vocals
- Anton Fig – drums, percussion

== Guitars and equipment ==
=== Guitars ===
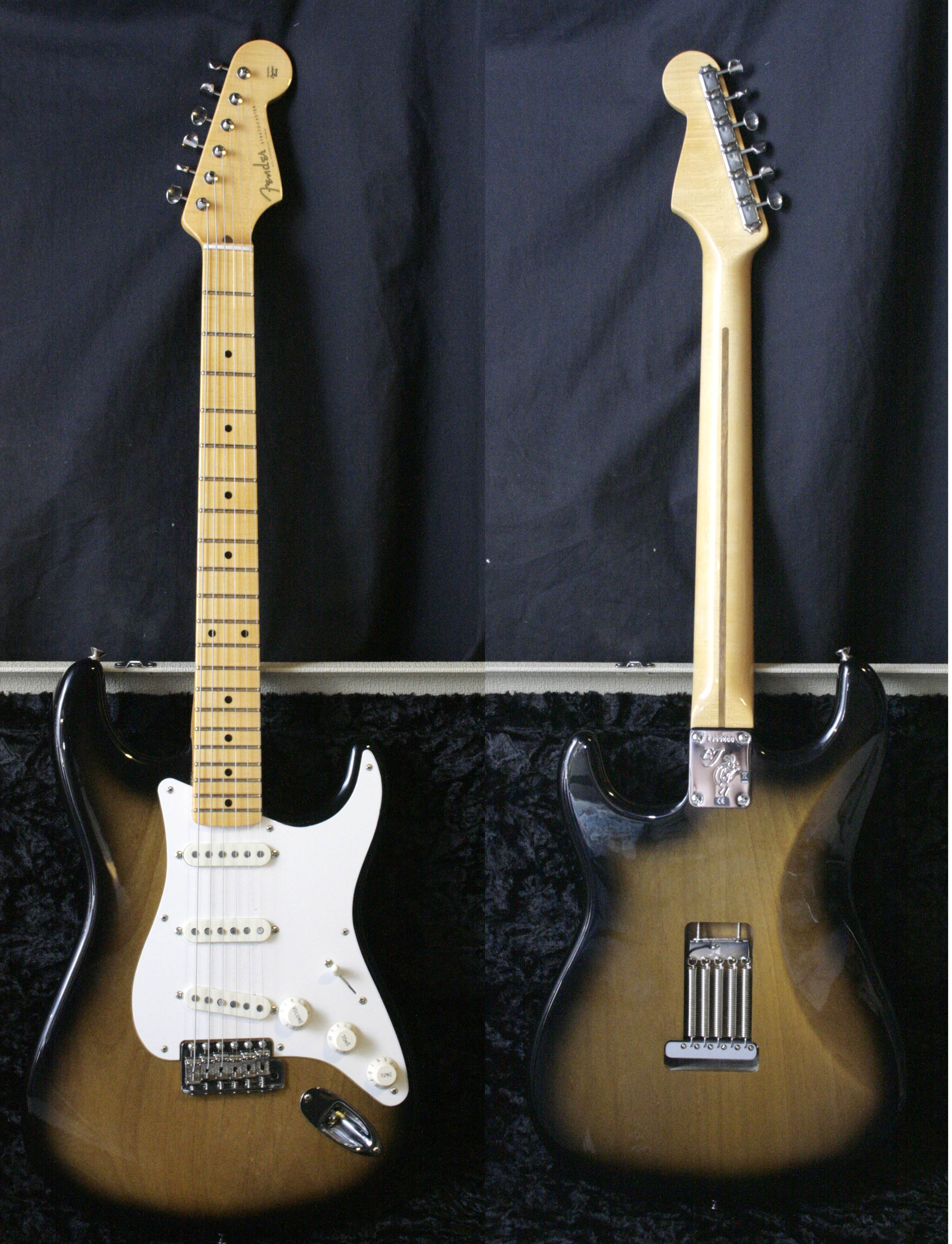
Fender Eric Johnson Stratocaster

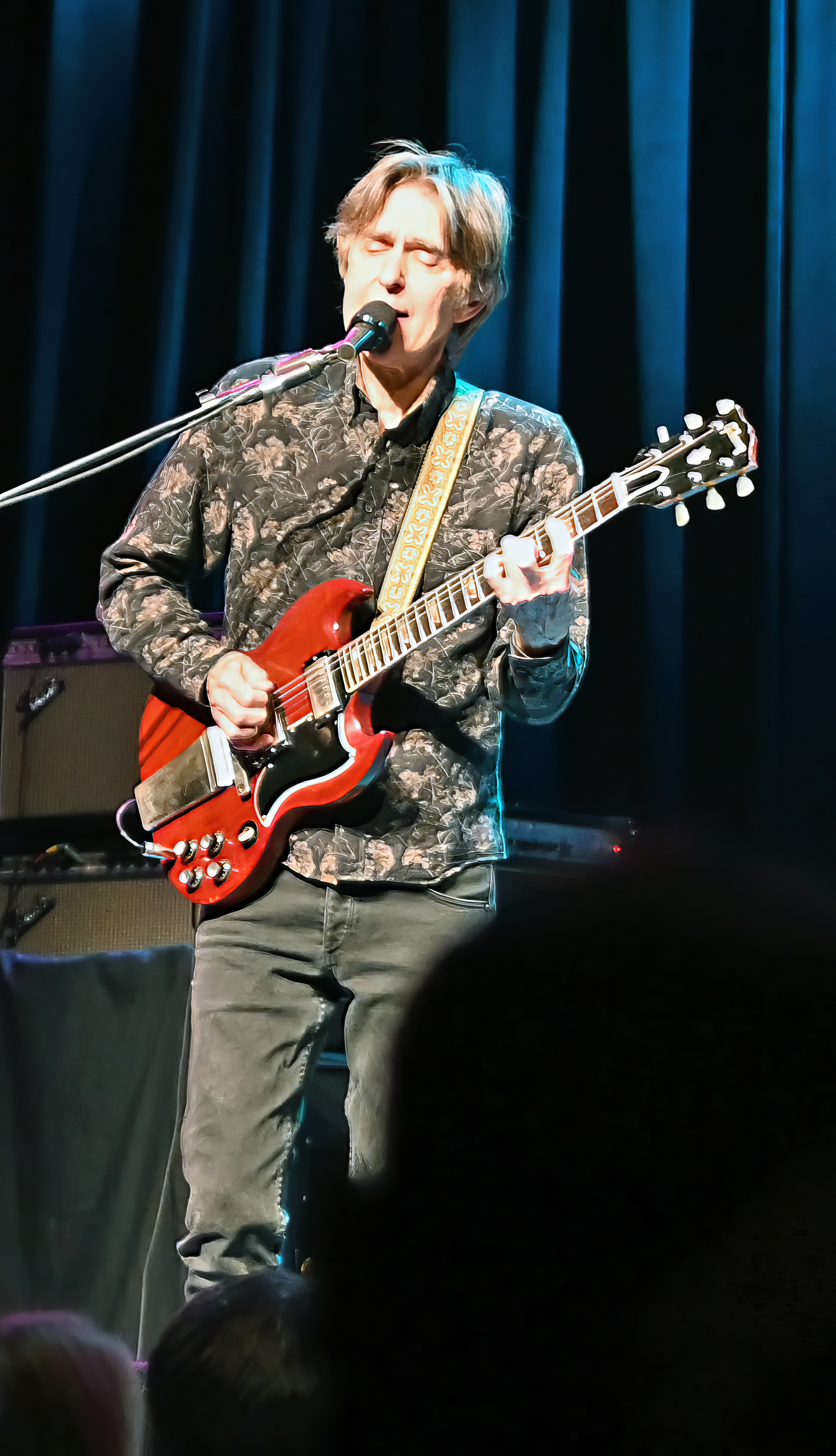
Johnson with a Gibson SG, 2023

Johnson is best known for playing the lightly modified Fender Stratocasters and Gibson ES-335 electric guitars through either a Fender or Marshall amplifier, depending on whether he is targeting a clean rhythm, dirty rhythm, or lead tone. He tends to swap out the bridge pickups in some of his Stratocasters for DiMarzio HS-2 pickups, because they do not hum as much as standard single-coil pickups. Johnson has also played other guitar brands such as Robin, Rickenbacker, Jackson, Maton, and Charvel, one of which appears on the cover of the Ah Via Musicom album. In 2001, Johnson added a Gibson Custom Shop '59 Les Paul Reissue to his collection of guitars. Of note, he no longer uses a Dumble amplifier, as he had to replace a faulty component in his favorite Dumble, the Steel String Singer. It never sounded the same afterwards, and he sold the amplifier to Carlos Santana.

Johnson has had several models built to his specifications for sale in the mass market. In 2003, C. F. Martin & Company released a limited-edition Eric Johnson Signature MC-40 guitar built for him. Johnson donated 5% of the guitar's sales profit to his father's college, Jefferson Medical College (now called the Thomas Jefferson University). Johnson has also been known to use the Martin D-45 before his signature Martin guitar was released.

In 2005, Fender released an Eric Johnson Signature Fender Stratocaster also built to his specifications. This was followed up by the Eric Johnson Signature Stratocaster Rosewood model in 2009. It featured the same specifications as the Eric Johnson Maple Neck guitar, but with the addition of an unusual three-ply, eight-hole white pick guard, hotter treble pickup, and a bound rosewood laminated fingerboard with pearloid dot position markers.

In January 2006, a man named Brian Sparks was arrested for posing as Johnson, and in the process, defrauding businesses out of about US$18,000 worth of guitars and equipment. Also in 2006, some of Johnson's guitars that had been stolen 24 years earlier were recovered.

Johnson has also released other signature gear such as GHS Eric Johnson Nickel Rockers Electric Guitar Strings, DiMarzio DP211 Eric Johnson Signature Custom Pickups, and a Fulton-Webb amplifier. Jim Dunlop also has released an Eric Johnson signature Jazz III plectrum and an Eric Johnson signature Fuzz Face. The Eminence Eric Johnson signature 12" alnico guitar speaker was introduced in 2012.

In early 2015, Roland Corporation announced the Eric Johnson Tone Capsule, an accessory to Roland Blues Cube amplifiers.

In March 2018, Fender released an Eric Johnson Signature Thinline Fender Stratocaster built to exactly the same specifications as his first signature Strat, the sole exception being that the guitar is a semihollow design. The guitar is available in Vintage White and two-color Sunburst, with quarter-sawn maple necks exclusively.

In early 2020, Fender announced the Eric Johnson "Virginia" Custom Shop Stratocaster, modeled after a 1954 Stratocaster he owned. The original "Virginia" was made out of sassafras and was featured extensively on Ah Via Musicom and Venus Isle.

=== Effects ===
Johnson uses effect pedals such as the Dallas-Arbiter Fuzz Face, B. K. Butler Tube Driver, MXR KD IV Stereo Chorus, Vox CryBaby wah-wah, ToadWorks Barracuda flanger, Prescription Electronics Experience octave fuzz, Xotic AC Booster, MXR Flanger/Doubler, Electro-Harmonix Deluxe Memory Man delay, Boss Corporation DD-2 Digital Delay, MXR 1500 Digital Delay, Line 6 Echo Pro Studio Modeler, and up to two Maestro Echoplex tape delays. All of these are connected to multiple A/B boxes to create sounds and tones that are both clean and distorted. Dunlop has also begun selling Johnson's signature Fuzz Face pedal.

=== Recording ===
In late 2006, Johnson switched from recording in analog to digital format.

== Discography ==
- Tones (1986)
- Ah Via Musicom (1990)
- Venus Isle (1996)
- Seven Worlds (1998)
- Souvenir (2003)
- Bloom (2005)
- Up Close (2010)
- Eclectic (2014)
- EJ (2016)
- Collage (2017)
- EJ Vol. II (2020)
- The Book of Making / Yesterday Meets Today (2022)

== Awards and nominations ==
Johnson has been nominated for eight Grammy Awards, winning once in 1992.

- Grammy Award nomination for Best Rock Instrumental, "Zap" (1986)
- Grammy Award nomination for Best Rock Instrumental, Ah Via Musicom (1990)
- Grammy Award nomination for Best Instrumental Composition, "Cliffs of Dover" (1992)
- Grammy Award for Best Rock Instrumental, "Cliffs of Dover" (1992)
- Grammy Award nomination for Best Rock Instrumental, "Pavilion" (1996)
- Grammy Award nomination for Best Rock Instrumental, "S.R.V." (1997)
- Grammy Award nomination for Best Pop Instrumental, "Rain" from the album Live and Beyond (2001)
- Grammy Award nomination for Best Pop Instrumental, Bloom (2005)
