= Stuart Hamm =

American bassist (born 1960)

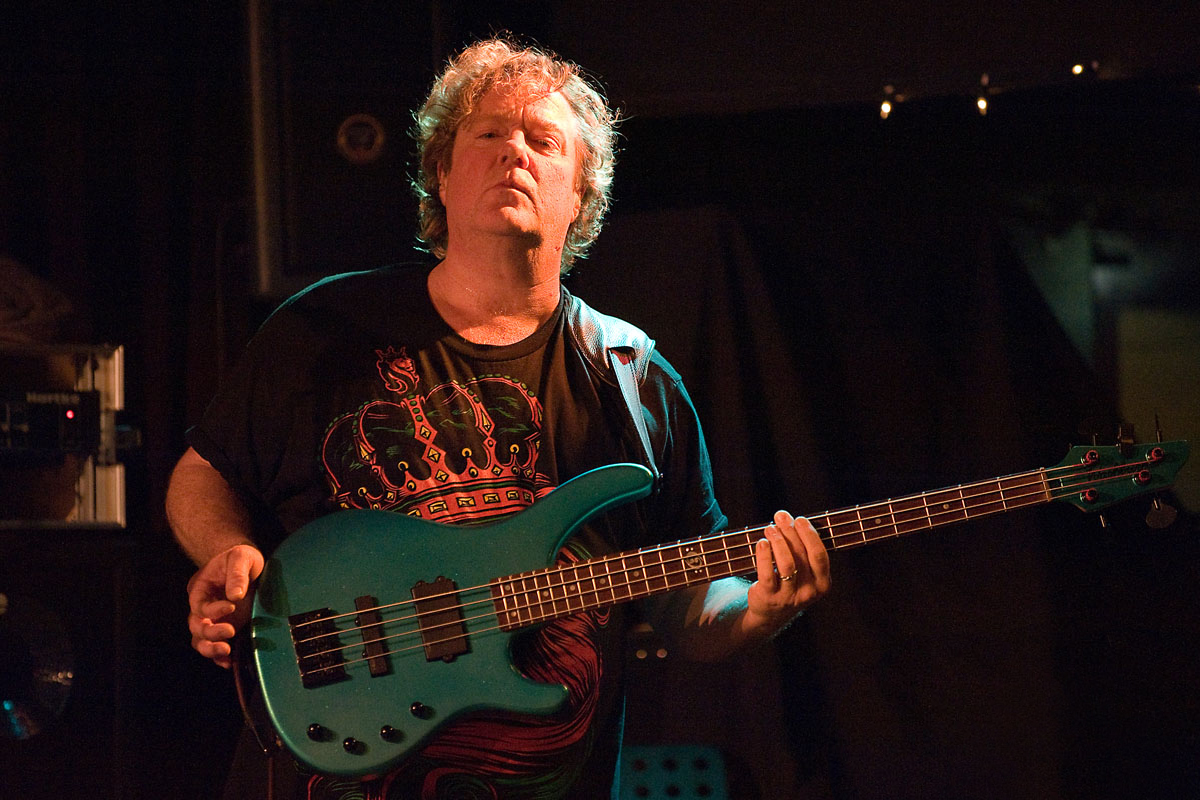
- Hamm performing with the Carl Verheyen Band at Paradox in Tilburg (November 16, 2013)

Background information
- Born: February 8, 1960 (age 66); New Orleans, Louisiana, US
- Genres: Blues rock; jazz rock; progressive rock
- Instruments: Bass guitar; vocals; keyboards
- Years active: 1984–present

Stuart Hamm (born February 8, 1960) is an American bass guitar player, known for his session and live work with numerous artists as well as for his unconventional playing style and solo recordings.

== Early life, family and education ==
Hamm was born in New Orleans, Louisiana. He spent most of his childhood in Champaign, Illinois, where he studied bass and piano. He played in the stage band at Champaign Central High School and was selected to the Illinois All-State Band. However, Hamm moved to Norwich, Vermont, and graduated from Hanover High in Hanover, New Hampshire in 1978.

Following high school, he attended the Berklee College of Music in Boston, Massachusetts, where he met guitarist Steve Vai. Berklee later awarded Hamm a Distinguished Alumni Degree (1990).

== Career ==
Hamm has performed and recorded with Steve Vai, Frank Gambale, Joe Satriani (whom Hamm met through Vai). Hamm played bass on Vai's debut solo album, Flex-Able, which was released in 1984. Because of his performances on tour with Satriani, Hamm's skills received national attention. Subsequent recordings with Satriani and other rock/fusion artists, along with the release of his own solo recordings, solidified his reputation as a bassist and performer.

Hamm's first solo album, Radio Free Albemuth, inspired by the Philip K. Dick novel of the same name, was released in 1988. On it, Hamm demonstrated his abilities on a number of original compositions spanning a variety of genres including fusion, country, and classical. On solo pieces like "Country Music (A Night in Hell)," he demonstrates his slapping and two-handed tapping proficiency as well as the ability to make the bass imitate the sounds of a wide range of instruments; the piece has since become a popular live piece. On the same album, he performs an arrangement of Beethoven's "Moonlight Sonata".

Early in his career, Hamm was associated with Philip Kubicki's Factor basses. Later, Fender musical instruments produced two signature model electric basses designed and endorsed by Hamm himself, the first artist model bass ever made by Fender: the "Urge Bass" and the "Urge II Bass" upgrade with a D-Drop Tuner. Features include a sleek alder body, a graphite reinforced maple neck with a 2-octave rosewood fingerboard, a pair of dual-coil Ceramic Noiseless Jazz Bass single-coils (neck/bridge), a custom-wound split-coil Precision Bass humbucking pickup (middle) and a 3-band active EQ with 18V power supply. These basses were discontinued in 2010. Hamm then had his own Washburn signature models since 2011, the AB40SH acoustic bass and the Hammer, featuring EMG pickups, Hipshot bridge/tuners and a 3-band active EQ - followed by a fretless version (SHBH3FLTSS) and the Stuart Hamm Electric Bass series, introduced on January 20, 2012. In 2014, he moved to Warwick basses and started work on a signature model based on his Washburn with the Warwick Streamer model shape.

Hamm's slapping, popping and two-handed tapping techniques are demonstrated on his solo recordings, as well as in his instructional videos, Slap, Pop & Tap For The Bass and Deeper Inside the Bass. A popular part of his live performance often includes a two-handed tapping arrangement of Vince Guaraldi's "Linus and Lucy" (from the animated television special A Charlie Brown Christmas).

Since March 2011, Hamm has performed with "The Deadlies," houseband for KOFY-TV's Creepy KOFY Movie Time.

In July 2011, Hamm accepted the position of Director of Bass Programs at Musician's Institute in Hollywood, California. For the past two decades, Hamm has also toured as one of the world's premier bass clinicians.

== Discography ==
=== Solo albums ===
- Radio Free Albemuth (1988)
- Kings of Sleep (1989)
- The Urge (1991)
- Outbound (2000)
- Live Stu X 2 (2007)
- Just Outside of Normal (2010)
- The Book Of Lies (2015)
- The Diary of Patrick Xavier (2018)
- Holdfast (2023)

=== With Frank Gambale ===
- The Great Explorers (1993)

=== With Frank Gambale and Steve Smith ===
- Show Me What You Can Do (1998)
- The Light Beyond (2000)
- GHS3 (2002)

=== With Joe Satriani ===
- Dreaming No. 11 (1988) -- Ice 9, Memories and Hordes of Locusts
- Flying in a Blue Dream (1989) -- Strange and The Bells of Lal (Part Two)
- Time Machine (1993) -- Disc One: Time Machine, The Mighty Turtle Head and All Alone. Disc Two: Circles, Lords of Karma and Echo
- Crystal Planet (1998) -- All Tracks except Time and Z.Z.'s Song
- Live in San Francisco (2001)
- Live In Paris: I Just Wanna Rock (2010)

=== With Joe Satriani, Eric Johnson, and Steve Vai ===
- G3 Live in Concert (1997) -- Tracks 1–3

=== With Steve Vai ===
- Flex-Able (1984)
- Passion and Warfare (1990)
- Fire Garden (1996) -- Track 3
- Modern Primative (2016) Tracks 3-6, 9-13

=== With other artists ===
- Richie Kotzen, Richie Kotzen (1989)
- Michael Schenker Group, Arachnophobiac (2003)
- Working Man, a Rush tribute album, tracks number 7, number 10, number 11 (1996)
- Yngwie Malmsteen, Ronnie James Dio, for Not The Same Old Song and Dance, an Aerosmith tribute album, track number 6, "Dream On" (1999)
- George Lynch, Gregg Bissonette, and Vince Neil, for Bat Head Soup, an Ozzy Osbourne tribute album, track number 9, "Paranoid" (2006)
- Caifanes (band) on the El nervio del volcán (album) on track number 8 Quisiera Ser Alcohol.
- Adrian Legg, Mrs. Crowe's Blue Waltz (1992)
- Bill Lonero, "Slather" (2004)
- David Stockden, "Reflections of Themes" (2009)
- Thomas Tomsen, "Sunflickers" (2010)
- Matthias Arp, "Endorphin Overdose" (2010) - Track 1+10
- Marco Iacobini, "The Sky There'll Always Be" (2013)
- Gretchen Menn, "Oleo Strut" (2011)

== Instructional videos ==
- Slap, Pop & Tap for the Bass (1987)
- "Deeper Inside the Bass" (1993)
- "Bass Basics" (2008)
- "Fretboard Fitness" (2010)
