= Ah Via Musicom =

Studio album by Eric Johnson
- Released: March 20, 1990
- Recorded: March 1988 – June 1989
- Studio: Riverside Sound, Arlyn Studios, Saucer One Studios and Studio Seven (Austin, Texas); Reelsound (Buda, Texas); Soundcastle (Hollywood, California)
- Genre: Instrumental rock, rock
- Length: 40:58
- Label: Capitol
- Producer: Eric Johnson

Eric Johnson chronology
Tones (1986)	Ah Via Musicom (1990)	Venus Isle (1996)

Singles from Ah Via Musicom
- 1. "High Landrons" Released: 1990; 2. "Righteous" Released: 1990; 3. "Cliffs of Dover" Released: October 1, 1991; 4. "Trademark" Released: 1991

Ah Via Musicom is the second studio album by guitarist Eric Johnson, released in 1990 through Capitol Records. The album reached No. 67 on the U.S. Billboard 200 and remained on that chart for 60 weeks. All four singles charted on Billboard's Mainstream Rock chart, with three of them being top 10 hits: "High Landrons" at No. 31, "Righteous" at No. 8, "Cliffs of Dover" at No. 5 and "Trademark" at No. 7. "Cliffs of Dover" went on to win the Award for Best Rock Instrumental Performance at the 1992 Grammys.

== Overview ==
Several songs are dedicated to fellow guitarists: Johnson stated in a March 1990 interview with Guitar Player magazine that "Steve's Boogie" is dedicated to Austin-based pedal steel guitarist Steve Hennig, while "Song for George" is dedicated to an 80-year-old guitarist friend of his named George Washington. Furthermore, "East Wes" is dedicated to jazz guitarist Wes Montgomery, and takes its name from the 1966 album East-West by The Paul Butterfield Blues Band.

A DVD-Audio edition of Ah Via Musicom was released in 2002 through Capitol Records, but without Johnson's input. After he expressed disappointment in the sound quality and mixing, it was soon withdrawn by the label after 2500 copies were sold. In an August 2005 issue of Guitar Player, he confirmed that an authorized 5.1 DVD-Audio edition of the album was in the works, but as of 2022 it has not been released.

== Critical reception ==
Professional ratings
Review scores
Source	Rating
AllMusic	4.5/5 stars

Robert Taylor at AllMusic gave Ah Via Musicom 4.5 stars out of 5, saying that it has "reached near-classic proportions within the guitar community" and highlighting the varied styles present, namely rock, pop, blues, country and jazz. Praise was given to Johnson for his "excellent chops and a clear tone" as well as his singing, which was described as "not quite as interesting as his guitar playing", but also for being "not obtrusive and ... at times quite pleasing".

"Cliffs of Dover" has endured as Johnson's best-known song and is a mainstay at his concerts. It was ranked No. 17 in a list of "100 Greatest Guitar Solos" by Guitar World magazine, No. 34 in a list of "50 greatest guitar tones of all time" by Guitarist magazine, and remains a highly regarded staple within the guitar community.

== Track listing ==
All tracks are written by Eric Johnson, except where noted.

"Part 1"
No.	Title	Length
1.	"Ah Via Musicom" (Johnson, Steve Barber)	2:05
2.	"Cliffs of Dover"	4:10
3.	"Desert Rose" (Johnson, Vince Mariani)	4:57
4.	"High Landrons"	5:46
5.	"Steve's Boogie"	1:52

"Part 2"
No.	Title	Length
6.	"Trademark"	4:44
7.	"Nothing Can Keep Me from You"	4:23
8.	"Song for George"	1:49
9.	"Righteous"	3:29
10.	"Forty Mile Town"	4:13
11.	"East Wes"	3:30
Total length:		40:58

== Personnel ==
Musicians

- Eric Johnson – guitars (1–7, 9–11), vocals (3, 4, 7, 10), acoustic piano (4, 7), lap steel guitar (4, 5, 10, 11), electric sitar (4), acoustic guitars (8)
- Steve Barber – synthesizers (1, 3, 4, 6, 10), keyboards (7, 11)
- Steven Hennig – guitar solo (5)
- Roscoe Beck – bass (1, 3, 7, 9, 10)
- Kyle Brock – bass (2–6, 11)
- Reggie Witty – bass (7)
- Tommy Taylor – drums (1–7, 9–11), percussion (4, 7, 10)
- Paul Bissell – percussion (1)
- James Fenner – percussion (10, 11)
- Wee Willie – harmonica (9)
- Jody Lazo – vocals (7, 10)

Music arrangements

- Steve Barber
- Roscoe Beck
- Kyle Brock
- Eric Johnson
- Vince Mariani
- Tommy Taylor
- Reggie Witty

Production

- Cinema Records, Inc. – executive producers
- Eric Johnson – producer, additional engineer
- Richard Mullen – engineer, mixing (4, 7, 8, 10)
- Michael Frondelli – mixing (1–3, 5–7, 9, 11)
- Chet Himes – additional engineer, technical assistance
- Bob Lacivita – additional engineer
- Walter New – additional engineer
- Dave Parks – additional engineer, technical assistance
- Stuart Sullivan – additional engineer
- Jerry Holmes – technical assistance
- Bill Johnson – technical assistance
- Bernie Grundman – mastering at Bernie Grundman Mastering (Hollywood, California)
- Denny Somach – project coordinator
- Jeffrey Fey – art direction, design
- Tommy Steele – art direction
- Geoff Kern – front cover photography
- Max Crace – back cover photography
- Joe Priesnitz – management

== Chart performance ==
=== Album ===
Year	Chart	Position
1990	Billboard 200	67

== Certifications ==
Region	Certification	Certified units/sales
United States (RIAA)	Platinum	1,000,000^{^}
^{^} Shipments figures based on certification alone.

=== Singles ===
Year	Title	Chart	Position
1990	"High Landrons"	Billboard Mainstream Rock	31
1990	"Righteous"	Billboard Mainstream Rock	8
1991	"Cliffs of Dover"	Billboard Mainstream Rock	5
1991	"Trademark"	Billboard Mainstream Rock	7

== Awards ==
Title	Event	Award	Result
"Cliffs of Dover"	1992 Grammys	Best Rock Instrumental Performance	Won
