= Stephen Barber (composer) =

American composer, arranger and musician

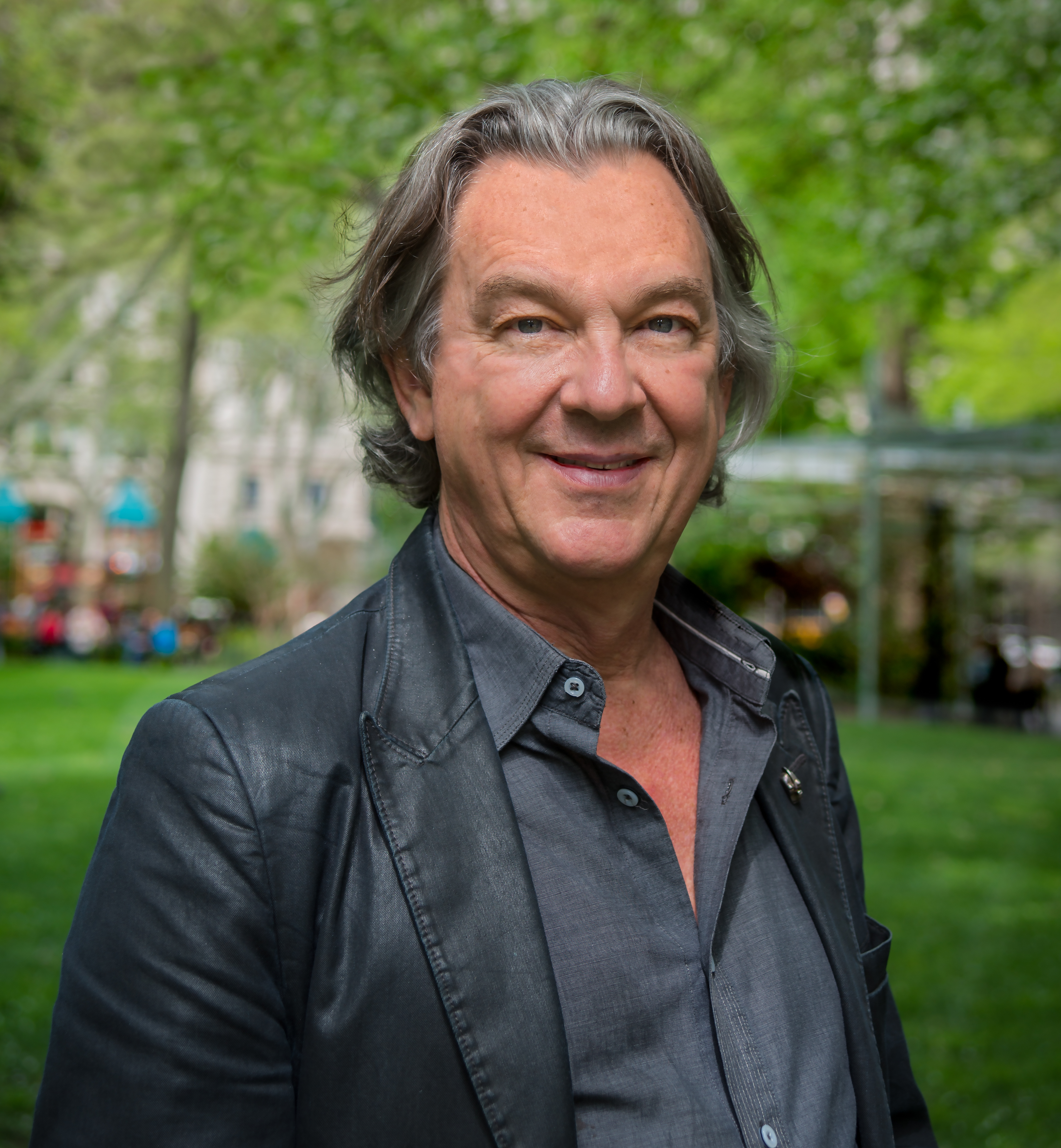
- Stephen Barber in 2015

Background information
- Born: April 6, 1952 (age 74); Abilene, Texas, U.S.
- Occupations: Composer, arranger, musician
- Website: www.stephenbarber.com

Stephen Barber is an American composer, arranger and musician, known for working with David Byrne, Keith Richards, John Legend, Natalie Merchant, T Bone Burnett, Rosanne Cash, the London Symphony Orchestra, Christopher Cross, Bonnie Raitt, Indigo Girls, Michael Stipe and Shawn Colvin.

== Early life ==
Barber was born April 6, 1952, in Abilene, Texas, to Carolyn Grisham Barber, a pianist and music teacher, and Harwell Barber, a businessman and philanthropist. His cousin is the author John Grisham, and his godfather is flamenco guitarist Jim Jennings. Barber started playing the piano at the age of three, began playing guitar at eleven and started writing music at the age of twelve. At fifteen, Barber went to Sewanee Military Academy in Tennessee, where he was the only student studying music theory. He attended summer school in 1971 at the University of Texas to study music composition, then attended Southwest Texas State University, where he studied music composition under composer Russell Riepe.

== Career ==
In 1974, Barber began a friendship with Gideon Waldrop, the Dean of Juilliard, however passed up an invitation to attend Juilliard at that time. He was in a band with Eric Johnson called The Electromagnets from 1974–1976 and in 1977, Barber moved to New York City, reconvened with Dean Waldrop, began monitoring classes at Juilliard and was accepted to study music composition and orchestration privately with John Corigliano. He was the keyboardist and arranger for Christopher Cross from 1983–1988 and during that time composed thirteen original scores for Shelley Duvall's Faerie Tale Theatre, under the direction of Van Dyke Parks. He was nominated for an ACE award for the episode, "3 Little Pigs". In the early 1990s, Barber composed for the BBC's National Geographic Explorer with David Attenborough and Mike Salisbury under the direction of producer Michael deGruy. In 1996, he began a mentorship with Joe Zawinul, and in the late 1990s he toured again with Eric Johnson. In 2001, Barber became a founder and artistic director of the Barbwire Music Project, an Austin, Texas–based non-profit commissioning, presenting and educational organization for contemporary American music. In 2004, he was inducted into the Austin Music Awards Hall of Fame. In 2011, he released his album, Astral Vinyl, on Navona Records. Barber currently resides in Austin, Texas.

== Selected works ==
In total, Barber has worked on more than 170 album projects and multiple television and movie scores.

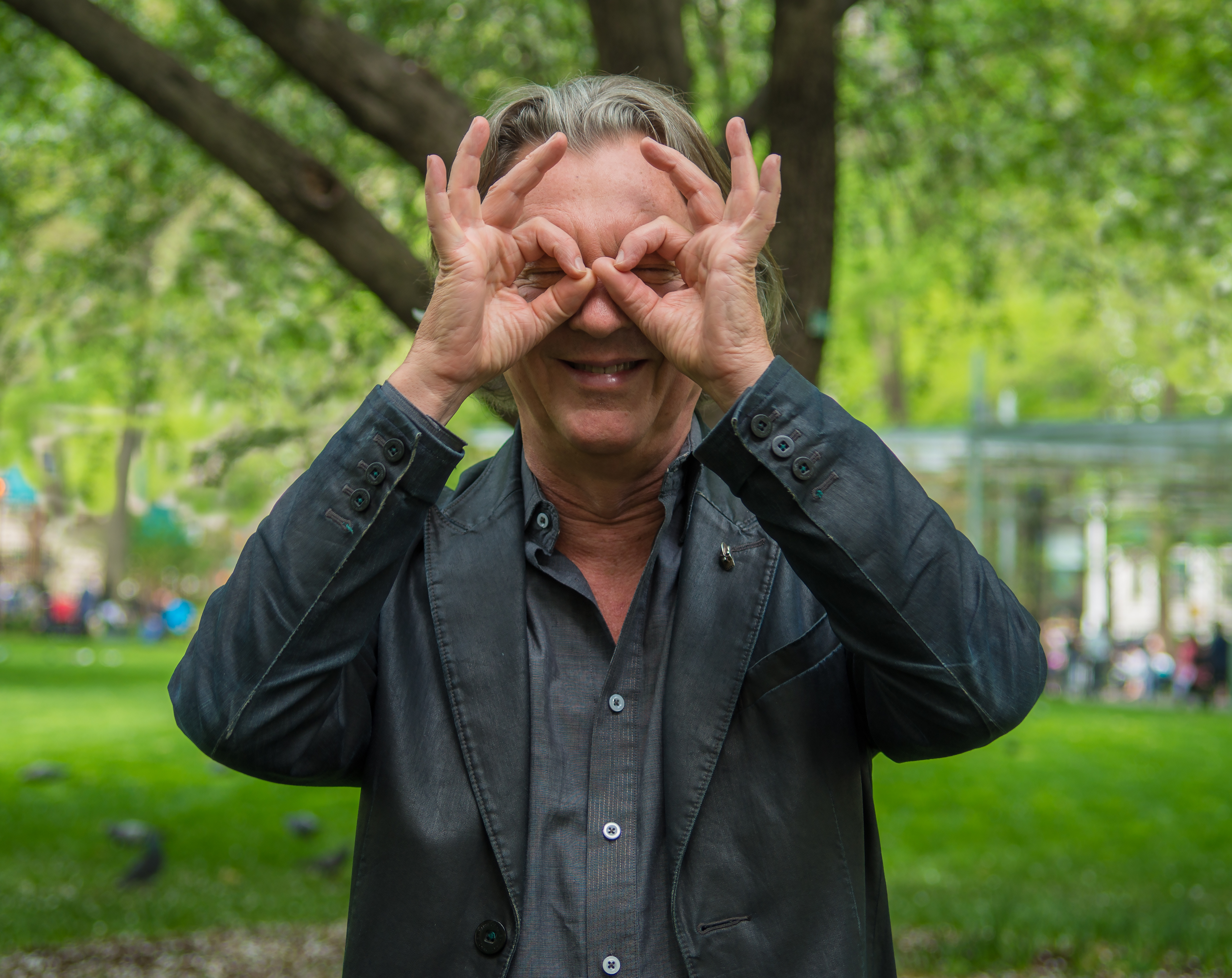
Stephen Barber Madison Square Park 2015

- 2014 Natalie Merchant – Natalie Merchant – String Arrangements, Woodwind Arrangement
- 2014 United States – Ian McLagan – String Arrangements
- 2013 Fourth Corner – Trixie Whitley – String Arrangements
- 2012 Ludwig Senfl: All Ding ein Weil – La Caccia – Instrument Design
- 2011 Stephen Barber: Astral Vinyl – Composer, Piano
- 2011 Bon Voyage: Music by Giovanni – Paolo Foscarini – The Foscarini Experience – Guitar Maker
- 2011 Red Hot + Rio 2 – Composer, producer, String Arrangements
- 2011 Rockpango – Los Lonely Boys – Composer, String Arrangements, String Writing
- 2010 Comfort in the Static – Kenny White – String Arrangements
- 2010 July Flame – Laura Veirs – String Arrangements
- 2010 Leave Your Sleep – Natalie Merchant – Arranger, Orchestration, String Arrangements
- 2010 The Best of Shawn Colvin – Shawn Colvin – Arranger
- 2010 When Everything Breaks Open – Matt Morris – String Arrangements, String Conductor
- 2009 Au Pres de Vous: French Chansons of the 16th Century – Mignarda – Instrument Design
- 2008 Live with the Tosca Strings – Terry Bozzio – Piano, Primary Artist
- 2008 Never Say Never – Ian McLagan – Arranger, String Arrangements
- 2007 I Am – Chrisette Michele – String Arrangements
- 2007 Join the Parade – Marc Cohn – String Arrangements
- 2007 Papito – Miguel Bosé – Guest Artist
- 2007 Remembered – Ted Greene – Keyboards
- 2007 The Sky Observer's Guide – Amy Cook – String Arrangements, Strings
- 2006 In the Footsteps of Herman Hollanders – Instrument Design
- 2006 Once Again – John Legend – String Arrangements
- 2006 Travesías – Susana Baca – Orchestration
- 2006 Un'altra Canzone – Instrument Design
- 2005 Cannonball – Mark David Manders – Organ (Hammond)
- 2005 From the Five – Stephen Bruton – Composer, Hammond B3, Main Personnel, Organ (Hammond), Pump Organ, Wurlitzer
- 2005 Live from Austin TX – Eric Johnson – Composer
- 2005 Live from Austin TX [DVD] – Eric Johnson – Composer
- 2005 Patch of Blue – Dee Carstensen – Arranger, producer
- 2005 The Rainbow Bear – Stephen Barber – Primary Artist
- 2004 13 Ways to Live – Composer, Guitar (Electric), Piano
- 2004 Boompa, Vol. 1 – Composer
- 2004 Get Lifted – John Legend – String Arrangements
- 2004 Grown Backwards – David Byrne – Arranger, Horn Arrangements, Prepared Piano
- 2004 Por Vida: A Tribute to the Songs of Alejandro Escovedo – Composer
- 2004 Salt – Arto Lindsay – Keyboards, String Arrangements, Violin Arrangement
- 2003 The Order – David Torn – Score Orchestration
- 2002 Divine Secrets of the Ya-Ya Sisterhood – Conductor, leader, String Arrangements
- 2002 Invoke – Arto Lindsay – Clarinet, Guitar, Horn Arrangements, Keyboards, Organ, Violin Arrangement
- 2002 Long Way Around: An Anthology 1991–2001 – Chris Whitley – Keyboards, Piano
- 2002 Spirit World – Stephen Bruton – Composer, Organ, Piano, Synthesizer
- 2001 A Man Under the Influence – Alejandro Escovedo – Composer
- 2001 L' Instant d'Apres – David Linx – Arranger
- 2001 Motherland – Natalie Merchant – Arranger, Conductor
- 2001 Rocket House – Chris Whitley – Arranger, Jaw Harp, Keyboards, Percussion, Piano, Programming, Synthesizer Bass
- 2001 Wait for Me – Jubilant Sykes – Arranger, Orchestra
- 2001 Whole New You – Shawn Colvin – String Arrangements
- 2000 Passenger – Tara MacLean – String Arrangements
- 2000 Q – Mr. Children – String Arrangements
- 1999 An American Diary, Vol. 2: The Dreamings – Mike Mainieri – Arranger, producer
- 1999 Iean-Pavle Paladin: Tablatvre De Lvth – Lute
- 1999 Nothing But the Truth – Stephen Bruton – Composer, Keyboards, Piano, producer
- 1999 This Is Life – Curiously Strong – Organ (Hammond), Piano, String Arrangements
- 1998 Little Ship – Loudon Wainwright III – String Arrangements
- 1997 G3: Live in Concert – Joe Satriani – Keyboards
- 1997 Merry Axemas: A Guitar Christmas – Arranger, Composer, Keyboards, Synthesizer
- 1996 Anxiety of Influence – Meridian Arts Ensemble – Composer
- 1996 Baby Sleep – Lute
- 1996 Venus Isle – Eric Johnson – Composer
- 1996 With These Hands – Alejandro Escovedo – Arranger, composer, Farfisa Organ, Keyboards, Organ (Hammond), Piano, Piano (Electric), Prepared Piano, String Arrangements, Synthesizer, Wurlitzer
- 1996 Zawinul: Stories of the Danube – Joe Zawinul – Assistant
- 1995 Every Second Counts – Jim Lauderdale – Keyboards
- 1995 Right on Time – Stephen Bruton – String Arrangements
- 1993 Monteverdi: Madrigali Concertati – Tragicomedia – Guitar Maker
- 1992 The Hunter – Jennifer Warnes – Arranger, Synclavier
- 1990 Ah Via Musicom – Eric Johnson – Keyboards, Synthesizer
- 1990 Beth Nielsen Chapman – Beth Nielsen Chapman – Arranger, Associate Producer
- 1990 Crimes of the Heart – Ute Lemper – Associate Producer
- 1989 N.Y.C. – Steps Ahead – Orchestration
- 1987 Famous Blue Raincoat: The Songs of Leonard Cohen – Jennifer Warnes – String Arrangements
- 1986 Tones – Eric Johnson – Arranger, composer, Fairlight, Fairlight CMI, Keyboards, Piano, Synthesizer
- 1975 Electromagnets – Electromagnets – Clarinet, composer, Keyboards, Piano, Piano (Electric), Synthesizer, Vocals, composer

Film and television

- 2015 The Teller and the Truth – Composer
- 2014 Road to Austin (Documentary) – Composer
- 2013 Looking For Mr Stieglitz (Short) – Composer
- 2007 Midway Through the Journey – short film by Dan Polsby – Composer
- 2006 Last Best Hope (Documentary) – Composer
- 2005 Rendezvous to Freedom – (PBS) – Composer
- 2005 The Last Days of the San Jose – Composer
- 2004 World Without Waves – Composer: additional music/Musician
- 2002 Divine Secrets of the Ya-Ya Sisterhood – Composer
- 1993 Son in Law – Writer: "Bled Me Dry"
- 1992 Galaxies Are Colliding – Music producer
- 1991 The Human Shield – Composer
- 1988 Nature – "Hawaii: Islands of the Fire Goddess" – Composer
- 1987 No Retreat, No Surrender 2 – Composer: additional music/orchestrator
- 1986 Popples – Composer
- 1986 Tall Tales & Legends – "Pecos Bill", "Davy Crockett", "Casey at the Bat" Episodes – Composer
- 1984–1985 Faerie Tale Theatre – 13 episodes including "The Emperor's New Clothes" (1985), "The Three Little Pigs" (1985), "Goldilocks and the Three Bears" (1984) – Composer
