= Cliffs of Dover (composition) =

Instrumental composition by Eric Johnson

Single by Eric Johnson

from the album Ah Via Musicom
- Released: February 1990
- Recorded: March 1988 – June 1989
- Studio: Austin's Riverside Sound; Saucer One Studio; Arlyn Studios; Studio Seven
- Genre: Instrumental rock, hard rock, progressive rock
- Length: 4:10; 6:15 (combined with "Ah Via Musicom")
- Label: Capitol Records
- Songwriter: Eric Johnson
- Producer: Eric Johnson

Audio sample
- file; help

"Cliffs of Dover" is an instrumental rock composition by the American guitarist, singer and songwriter Eric Johnson, released on his 1990 studio album Ah Via Musicom. Johnson had performed it as early as 1984.

The album version is composed in the key of G major. It was played with a Gibson ES-335 (as well as a Fender Stratocaster) through a B. K. Butler Tube Driver and an Echoplex plugged into a 100-watt Marshall amplifier. The composition takes its name from the White Cliffs of Dover, a coastline in southern England.

== Structure ==
"Cliffs of Dover" begins with an ad-libbed electric guitar solo, using techniques such as string skipping and hybrid picking. In the solo intro, Johnson does not adhere to any distinct time signature. Drums are added as the composition settles into a 4/4 rhythmic shuffle verse accompanied by a very accessible set of melodies that, throughout the intro, feature variations (octavations for example) on the main chorus.

The outro or coda then recalls the freestyle mood and timing of the ad-libbed intro.

While he did indeed compose "Cliffs of Dover", Johnson does not take full credit, saying "I don't even know if I can take credit for writing 'Cliffs of Dover' ... it was just there for me one day ... literally wrote in five minutes ... kind of a gift from a higher place that all of us are eligible for. We just have to listen for it and be available to receive it."

== Equipment ==
Johnson has stated that the guitar he used in the intro before the band kicks in is a 1954 Strat (possibly "Virginia"). When the band comes, the guitar is a stop-tail Gibson ES-335 (either a 1963 or 1964) until the solo. The first part of the solo Johnson recorded with ES-335 was cut out and replaced with a Stratocaster through a 1980s Tube Driver. Halfway through the solo, around 3:03, a change in tone occurs when the guitar switches back to the original Gibson lead track. He got playful remarks about it from engineer Richard Mullen, saying "You can't do that!" but it was agreed that it sounded like Johnson simply enabled an effect pedal halfway through the solo.

== Accolades ==
"Cliffs of Dover" was voted number 17 in Guitar World magazine's list of 100 Greatest Guitar Solos, placing it between 16, "Heartbreaker" (by Led Zeppelin) and 18 "Little Wing" (by The Jimi Hendrix Experience).

In 1992, "Cliffs of Dover" won a Grammy Award for Best Rock Instrumental Performance, beating the Allman Brothers Band ("Kind of Bird"), Danny Gatton ("Elmira Street Boogie"), Rush ("Where's My Thing?"), and Yes ("Masquerade").
