= Grady (band) =

American Southern rock band

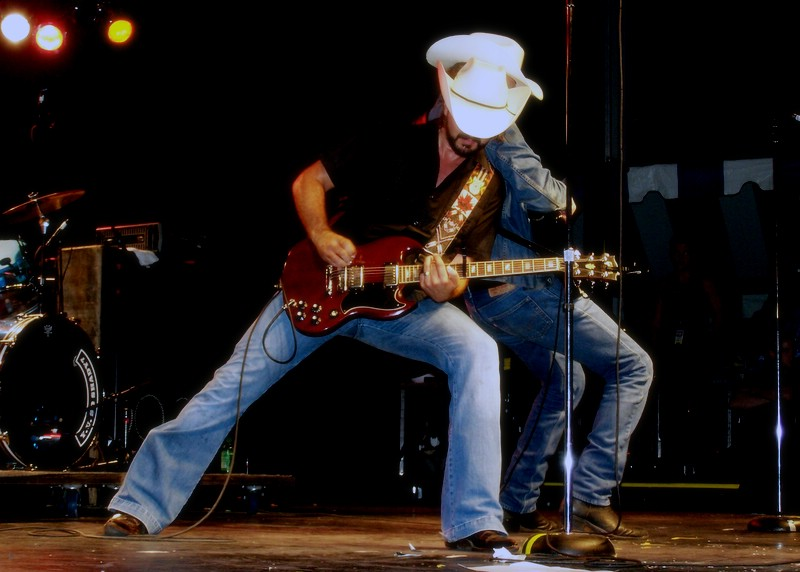
- Gordie and Big Ben of Grady in 2006

Background information
- Origin: Austin, Texas, United States
- Genres: Southern rock; hard rock; heavy metal; Texas blues
- Years active: 2003–2022
- Labels: Alternative Tentacles, Universal Music, Voices of Wonder, Textone, C12
- Members: Gordie Johnson; Ben Richardson; Trinidad Leal
- Past members: Chris Layton; Billy Maddox; Nina Singh
- Website: therealgrady.com

Grady was an American Southern rock band based in Austin, Texas.

== History ==
Grady originally consisted of Canadian vocalist and guitarist Gordie Johnson (known as Grady Johnson as part of the band), Canadian bass guitarist "Big" Ben Richardson, and Chris Layton on drums. Prior to Grady, Johnson was the frontman for Big Sugar, Layton was the drummer for Stevie Ray Vaughan's Double Trouble rhythm section, and Richardson was with The Jeff Healey Band and The Phantoms in Toronto.

Grady often plays at The Continental Club in Austin, did an eight stop Canadian tour in March 2005, and appeared at the University of Regina to play a free show in September 2005. This was followed up by an album called Y.U. So Shady?. The band released "Hammer In My Hand" as a single from the album, which was a moderate hit on Canadian radio, peaking at No. 14 on Canada's Rock chart in 2005. After the issue of a second album, A Cup of Cold Poison, Grady made two extensive tours to Canada early in 2008.

The band caught the attention of Jello Biafra of the Dead Kennedys who released Y.U. So Shady? in the United States.

Chris Layton was replaced on drums by Billy Maddox in early 2006. Maddox was also a veteran of the Austin music scene, having played with The Electromagnets, Alien Love Child and The Eric Johnson Band.

In 2006, Grady shot a video for "Woman Got My Devil" which was played in Canada on MuchMoreMusic. Produced by Michael Maxxis and directed by David Hogan, the video featured Witchbaby from A&E's Rollergirls, as well as a number of other Rollergirls in supporting roles. It was shot in Luck, Texas, an 1800s Western town owned by Willie Nelson.

In 2007, Grady released their second album, entitled A Cup of Cold Poison, which was recorded at Willie Nelson's Pedernales Studio. The album features appearances by Willie Nelson, Alejandro Escovedo and Ron Hynes. The band released a single for "You're What's Happening Baby".

In September 2007 drummer Billy Maddox left Grady due to a pre-existing health condition. The band began touring again in November 2007 with a new drummer, Nina "The Queena" Singh formerly of the Austin-based band Kitty Gordon.

Grady's next album, Good As Dead, was released in Canada on C12 Records in 2009. The album contains a cover version of The Tragically Hip's "Boots or Hearts", which Gordie Johnson described as "volatile", as well as the eponymous "Good as Dead", penned by Johnson. The record showcases the "Cowboy Metal" sound and features backup vocals by drummer Nina Singh.

In April 2010, Gordie Johnson made his directorial debut when he wrote and directed the video for "If I Was King" on location in Texas. It is dedicated to Johnson's lifelong friend, comedian Eric Tunney.

Grady released the live DVD/CD during the Calling All My Demons tour in late 2010. Footage for the DVD was requested by Gordie Johnson from all in attendance at Grady's October 2009 show at the Pyramid Cabaret in Winnipeg, Manitoba. On December 27, 2010, Billy Maddox was killed in a tragic freak shooting in his house.

In August 2011 drummer Nina "The Queena" Singh left Grady to join Court Yard Hounds. Drummer Trinidad Leal from Dixie Witch worked with the band from that point on.

While considered an American band by location of establishment, most members of Grady are Canadian.

On July 31, 2022, the band issued a statement on Facebook confirming the group's disbandment after 18 years.

== Discography ==
- Y.U. So Shady? (2004)
- A Cup of Cold Poison (2007)
- Good as Dead (2009)
- Calling All My Demons [live] (2010)
