= Malford Milligan =

American singer

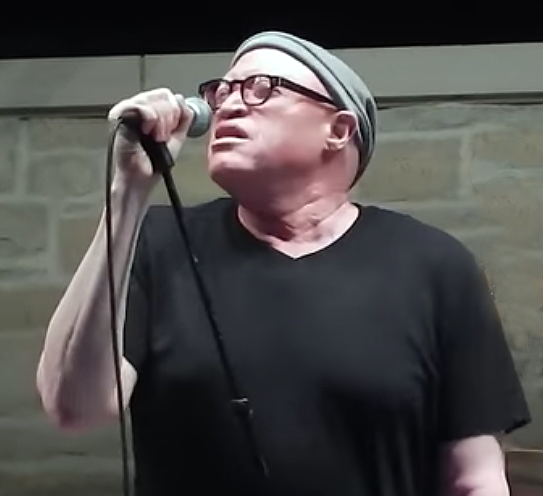
- Milligan performing in Wisconsin 2016

Background information
- Born: March 29, 1959 (age 67); Taylor, Texas United States
- Genres: Blues; Rock; Gospel; Soul
- Occupation: Singer
- Instrument: vocals
- Years active: 1981–present

Malford Milligan (born March 29, 1959) is an American singer. He sings soul, blues and gospel songs and also writes music. He has won eight Austin Music Awards for Best Vocalist.

== Career ==
=== Storyville ===
In 1994 Milligan became the singer for Storyville until they broke up in 2000. Storyville never managed to become a national act. Milligan became a session singer and recorded vocals for many musicians such as Eric Johnson and Chris Smither.

=== Solo ===
Between 2002 and 2006 he recorded several albums with his own band, The Malford Milligan Band and provided vocals for Greg Koch led bands.

2017-2019

In 2017 Milligan began singing with The Southern Aces band.

2019-2020

On tour in the Netherlands with the Blues and Americana Tour of Johan Derksen in about 80 concert halls and theaters (all sold out). Concerts after March 2020 were postponed due to COVID-19 restrictions.

=== Awards ===
- The Austin Chronicle named Milligan the "Best Male Vocalist of the Decade" in 2000.
- Austin Music Awards Best Vocalist 8 Times

== Discography with Storyville ==
- Bluest Eyes (1993)
- A Piece of Your Soul (1995)
- Dog Years (1998)
- Live at Antone's (2006)

== Discography of other projects ==
- Alive And More (Funky London) (2000)
- The Gospel According to Austin, Vol. 2 (2001)
- Sweet Cherry Soul (2002)
- No Good Deed Goes Unpunished (2004)
- The Malford Milligan Band Rides Again (2006)
- Live on the Radio (Greg Koch and Other Bad Men) (2007)
- Nation Sack (Greg Koch and Malford Milligan) (2009)
- An Evening with the Songs of Stephen Bruton (2010)
- The Milligan Vaughan Project (2017)
- Life Will Humble You (Malford Milligan & The Southern Aces) (2018)
- I Was a Witness (Malford Milligan & The Southern Aces) (2021)
- "Cry Sky" (double trouble, Been a Long Time) (2001)

== Education ==
- Elgin High School in 1978
- Texas Tech University
- University of Texas at Austin (Sociology major dropped out 1981)

== Personal ==
Milligan was raised in Elgin and Lubbock, Texas. His family worked on cotton farms in Central Texas to the south plains. Milligan was born a black albino. He is now almost blind. Milligan got married in January 2019.

== See also ==
- Music of Austin, Texas
