= Judy Collins discography =

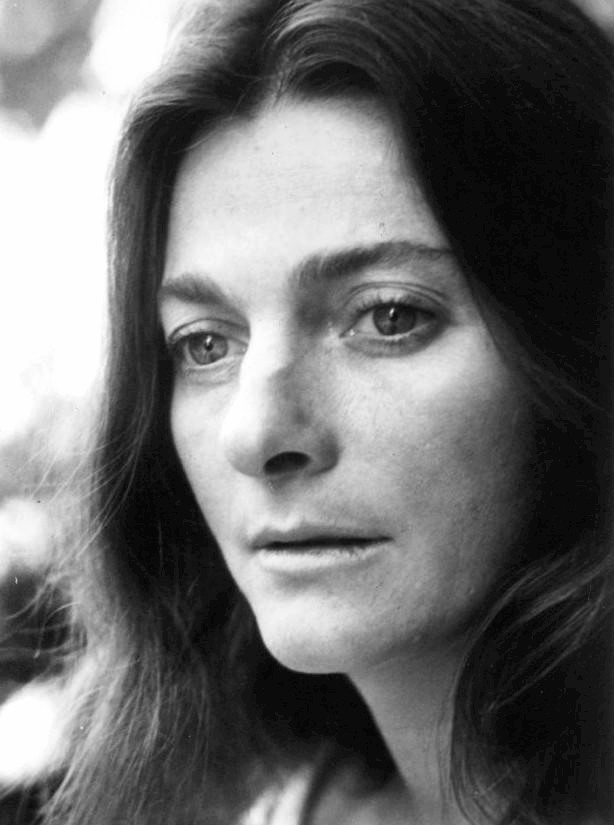
- Publicity photo of Collins, 1975
- Studio albums: 36
- Live albums: 9
- Compilation albums: 24 plus
- Tribute albums: 3
- Singles: 21

The discography of Judy Collins, an American singer-songwriter and musician, consists of 36 studio albums, nine live albums, numerous compilation albums, four holiday albums, and 21 singles. She has two Platinum-certified albums, which includes a greatest hits collection, and four Gold-certified albums. Eleven of her singles have charted on the Billboard Hot 100, with five of them hitting the Top 40, and twelve have charted on the Billboard Adult Contemporary chart, with eleven hitting the Top 40.

Collins's debut album, A Maid of Constant Sorrow, was released in 1961 and consisted of traditional folk songs. She had her first charting single with "Hard Lovin' Loser" (No. 97) from her 1966 album In My Life, but it was the lead single from her 1967 album Wildflowers, Joni Mitchell's "Both Sides, Now", that gave Collins international prominence. The single reached No. 8 on the Billboard Pop Singles chart and won Collins her first Grammy Award for Best Folk Performance, while Wildflowers went Gold. Collins experienced the biggest success of her career with her recording of Stephen Sondheim's "Send in the Clowns" from her 1975 album Judith. The single peaked at No. 36 on the Billboard Pop Singles chart in 1975 and then again in 1977 at No. 19, spending 27 non-consecutive weeks on the chart and earning Collins a Grammy Award nomination for Best Pop Vocal Performance, Female, as well as a Grammy Award for Sondheim for Song of the Year. Judith would also become Collins' best-selling studio album, eventually going Platinum.

In 2017, Collins's rendition of the song "Amazing Grace" was selected for preservation in the National Recording Registry by the Library of Congress as being "culturally, historically, or aesthetically significant". In 2019 at the age of 80, Collins scored her first No. 1 album on an American Billboard Chart with Winter Stories, a duet album with Jonas Fjeld featuring the Chatham County Line.

Her 2022 release, Spellbound, was her first album to feature all original material. Spellbound was nominated for the Grammy Award for Best Folk Album, her first since Silver Skies Blue with Ari Hest in 2016.

== Albums ==
=== Studio albums ===
Title	Year	Peak chart positions				Certifications
Title	Year	US	AUS	CAN	UK	Certifications
A Maid of Constant Sorrow	1961	—	—	—	—	
Golden Apples of the Sun	1962	—	—	—	—	
Judy Collins 3	1963	126	—	—	—	
Fifth Album	1965	69	—	—	—	
In My Life	1966	46	—	—	—	RIAA: Gold
Wildflowers	1967	5	—	5	—	RIAA: Gold
Who Knows Where the Time Goes	1968	29	—	12	—	RIAA: Gold
Whales & Nightingales	1970	15	26	14	16	RIAA: Gold
True Stories and Other Dreams	1973	27	—	9	—	
Judith	1975	17	19	19	7	RIAA: Platinum
Bread and Roses	1976	25	96	—	—	
Hard Times for Lovers	1979	54	—	56	—	
Running for My Life	1980	142	—	—	—	
Times of Our Lives	1982	190	—	—	—	
Home Again	1984	—	—	—	—	
Amazing Grace	1985	—	85	—	34	
Trust Your Heart	1987	—	—	—	—	
Fires of Eden	1990	—	—	—	—	
Baby's Bedtime	1990	—	—	—	—	
Baby's Morningtime	1990	—	—	—	—	
Judy Sings Dylan... Just Like a Woman	1993	—	—	—	—	
Shameless	1995	—	—	—	—	
Voices	1995	—	—	—	—	
Both Sides Now	1998	—	—	—	—	
Classic Broadway	1999	—	—	—	—	
Judy Collins Sings Leonard Cohen: Democracy	2004	—	—	—	—	
Portrait of an American Girl	2005	—	—	—	—	
Judy Collins Sings Lennon and McCartney	2007	—	—	—	—	
Paradise	2010	— (Note: Paradise did not enter the Billboard 200, but it peaked at number 11 on the Americana/Folk Albums chart.)	—	—	— (Note: Paradise did not enter the Official Albums Chart, but it peaked at number 49 on the Official Independent Albums Chart in the UK.)	
Bohemian	2011	—	—	—	—	
Strangers Again	2015	77	—	—	—	
Silver Skies Blue	2016	—	—	—	—	
A Love Letter to Stephen Sondheim	2017	—	—	—	—	
Everybody Knows (with Stephen Stills)	2017	195	—	—	—	
Winter Stories (with Jonas Fjeld and Chatham County Line)	2019	— (Note: Winter Stories did not enter the Billboard 200, but it peaked at number 1 on the Bluegrass Albums chart.)	—	—	—	
Spellbound	2022	— (Note: Spellbound did not enter the Billboard 200, but it peaked at number 60 on the Top Current Album Sales chart.)	—	—	— (Note: Spellbound did not enter the Official Albums Chart, but it peaked at number 26 on the Official Americana Chart in the UK.)	

=== Live albums ===
Album	Year	Peak chart positions	
Album	Year	US	CAN
The Judy Collins Concert	1964	—	—
Living	1971	64	49
Sanity and Grace	1989	—	—
Live at Newport (1959–1966)	1996	—	—
Judy Collins Live at Wolf Trap	2000	—	—
Live at the Metropolitan Museum of Art	2012	—	—
Live in Ireland	2014	—	—
Winter Stories: Live From The Oslo Opera House	2020	—	—
Live at the Town Hall, NYC, 2020	2021	—	—

=== Compilation albums ===
Album	Year	Peak chart positions		Certifications
Album	Year	US	CAN	Certifications
Recollections	1969	29	17	
Colors of the Day	1972	37	26	RIAA: Platinum
So Early in the Spring... The First 15 Years	1977	42	59	
Wind Beneath My Wings	1992	—	—	
Sanity & Grace	1995	—	—	
Forever: An Anthology	1997	—	—	
The Very Best of Judy Collins	2001	—	—	
36 Greatest Hits!	2002	—	—	
Classic Songs	2003	—	—	
The Essential Judy Collins	2004	—	—	
Introducing... Judy Collins	2006	—	—	
Golden Legends: Judy Collins	2006	—	—	
20 Classic Songs	2008	—	—	
Send in the Clowns: The Collection	2012	—	—	
Original Album Series	2013	—	—	
Both Sides Now: The Very Best Of	2014	—	—	
Drop the Needle On the Hits: Best of Judy Collins	2018	—	—	
The Elektra Albums, Vol. 1 (1961–1968)	2019	—	—	
The Elektra Albums, Vol. 2 (1970–1984)	2019	—	—	
White Bird: Anthology of Favorites	2019	—	—	

=== Other albums ===
Album	Year
Innervoices (Richard Stoltzman with Judy Collins)	1989
Come Rejoice: A Judy Collins Christmas	1994
Christmas at the Biltmore Estate	1997
All on a Wintery Night	2000
Christmas with Judy Collins (Note: Reissue of All on a Wintry Night with 2 bonus tracks)	2013

== Singles ==
Title	Year	Peak chart positions						Album
Title	Year	US	AUS	CAN	IRL	NZ	UK	Album
"Turn! Turn! Turn!" (Note: Collins first released "Turn! Turn! Turn!" on her 1963 album Judy Collins 3.) (b/w "Farewell")	1963							Judy Collins #3
"I'll Keep It with Mine" (b/w "Thirsty Boots" from the Fifth Album)	1965	—	—	—	—	—	—	Non-album single
"Hard Lovin' Loser" (b/w "I Think It's Going To Rain Today")	1966	97	—	—	—	—	—	In My Life
"Both Sides Now" (b/w "Hey, That's No Way To Say Goodbye")	1967							Wildflowers
"Both Sides Now" (b/w "Who Knows Where The Time Goes")	1968	8	37	6	—	—	14	Wildflowers
"Someday Soon" (b/w "My Father")	1969	55	—	37	—	—	—	Who Knows Where the Time Goes
"Chelsea Morning" (b/w "Pretty Polly" from Who Knows...)	1969	78	—	72	—	—	—	Non-album single
"Turn! Turn! Turn!" (Note: Collins first released "Turn! Turn! Turn!" on her 1963 album Judy Collins 3.) (b/w "Pack Up Your Sorrows")	1969	69	—	44	—	—	—	Recollections
"Amazing Grace" (b/w "Nightingale I")	1970	15	10	14	12	—	5	Whales & Nightingales
"Time Passes Slowly" (b/w 'Nightingale")	1970							Whales & Nightingales
"Open The Door (Song For Judith)" (b/w "Innisfree")	1971	90	—	—	—	—	—	Living
"In My Life" (b/w "Sunny Goodge Street")	1972							Colors of the Day: The Best of ...
"Cook With Honey" (b/w "So Begin The Task")	1973	32	—	36	—	—	—	True Stories and Other Dreams
"Secret Gardens" (b/w "The Hostage")	1973							True Stories and Other Dreams
"Send In the Clowns" (b/w "Houses")	1975	19	13	15	3	22	6	Judith
"Angel Spread Your Wings" (b/w "Moon is a Harsh Mistress")	1975							Judith
"Everything Must Change" (b/w "Special Delivery")	1976	—	—	—	—	—	—	Bread and Roses
"Bread and Roses" (b/w "Out of Control")	1976							Bread and Roses
"Hard Times For Lovers" (b/w Happy End)	1979	66	—	76	—	—	—	Hard Times For Lovers
"Where or When" (b/w "Dorothy")	1979							Hard Times For Lovers
"Almost Free" (b/w "Bright Morning Star")	1980							Running for My Life
"The Rainbow Connection" (b/w "Running For My Life")	1980							Running for My Life
"Memory" (b/w "The Life You Dream")	1982							Times of Our Lives
"Drink a Round to Ireland"	1982							Times of Our Lives
"Home Again" (with T.G. Sheppard) (b/w "Dream On")	1984	— (Note: "Home Again" did not enter the Billboard Hot 100, but it peaked at number 57 on the Hot Country Songs chart.)	—	—	—	—	—	Home Again
"Fires of Eden"	1990	— (Note: "Fires of Eden" did not enter the Billboard Hot 100, but it peaked at number 31 on the Adult Contemporary chart.)	—	—	—	—	—	Fires of Eden
"The Colorado Song (The Blizzard)"(single edit and album version)	1990							Fires of Eden
"Pacing the Cage", "Sally Go 'Round The Roses"	2005							Portrait Of An American Girl
"When Your Eyes Close" (with Puressence)	2015							Strangers Again (Deluxe Edition)
"Helpless" (duet with Rachael Sage)	2014							
