= Colors of the Day =

Colors of the Day: The Best of Judy Collins

Compilation album by Judy Collins
- Released: May 1972
- Recorded: 1966–1970
- Genre: Folk
- Length: 46:58
- Label: Elektra
- Producer: Mark Abramson, David Anderle

Judy Collins chronology
Living (1971)	Colors of the Day: The Best of Judy Collins (1972)	True Stories and Other Dreams (1973)

Professional ratings
Review scores
Source	Rating
AllMusic	4.5/5 stars
Christgau's Record Guide	C+
The Encyclopedia of Popular Music	4/5 stars
The Rolling Stone Album Guide	4/5 stars

Colors of the Day: The Best of Judy Collins (or simply Colors of the Day) is a compilation album by American singer and songwriter Judy Collins, released by Elektra Records in 1972. In the United Kingdom, it was released as Amazing Grace: The Best of Judy Collins (not to be confused with her 1985 UK album Amazing Grace). The album peaked at No. 37 on the Billboard Pop Albums charts.

The compilation was produced by Elektra's Mark Abramson and contains 12 tracks, including Collins' U.S. top-forty hit cover of Joni Mitchell's "Both Sides Now", her recording of "Amazing Grace", Sandy Denny's "Who Knows Where the Time Goes", and Collins' own composition "Albatross". (The latter two recordings were included in the film adaptation of The Subject Was Roses. Former United States president Bill Clinton has called the album an all-time favorite.

In 1974, the album was certified Gold by the RIAA for sales of over 500,000 copies. In 1997, it was certified Platinum for sales of over 1,000,000 copies.

== Track listing ==
Side one

No.	Title	Original release	Length
1.	"Someday Soon" (Ian Tyson)	Who Knows Where the Time Goes (1968)	3:44
2.	"Since You Asked" (Judy Collins)	Wildflowers (1967)	2:33
3.	"Both Sides Now" (Joni Mitchell)	Wildflowers	3:14
4.	"Sons Of" (Eric Blau, Jacques Brel, Gerard Jouannest, Mort Shuman)	Whales & Nightingales (1970)	2:23
5.	"Suzanne" (Leonard Cohen)	In My Life (1966)	4:24
6.	"Farewell to Tarwathie" (Traditional; arranged and adapted by Collins)	Whales & Nightingales	5:34

Side two

No.	Title	Original release	Length
1.	"Who Knows Where the Time Goes" (Sandy Denny)	Who Knows Where the Times Goes	4:40
2.	"Sunny Goodge Street" (Donovan)	In My Life	2:56
3.	"My Father" (Collins)	Who Knows Where the Time Goes	5:02
4.	"Albatross" (Collins)	Wildflowers	4:50
5.	"In My Life" (Lennon–McCartney)	In My Life	2:53
6.	"Amazing Grace" (Traditional; arranged and adapted by Collins)	Whales & Nightingales	4:07

== Personnel ==
- Judy Collins

Instrumental duties are unspecified in liner notes.

Technical

- Mark Abramson – producer, additional mixing
- David Anderle – producer
- Joshua Rifkin – arranger, conductor
- John Haeny – engineer
- Betty Beaird – photography

== Charts ==
Weekly chart performance for Colors of the Day
Chart (1972)	Peak position
Canada Top 100 Albums (RPM)	24
US Top LP's & Tapes (Billboard)	37
US Top 100 Albums (Cash Box)	39
US The Album Chart (Record World)	33

== Certifications and sales ==
Certifications for Colors of the Day
Region	Certification	Certified units/sales
United States (RIAA)	Platinum	1,000,000^{^}
^{^} Shipments figures based on certification alone.
