= The Very Best of Judy Collins =

Greatest hits album by Judy Collins
- Released: August 21, 2001
- Recorded: 1964–75
- Genres: Folk, pop, rock
- Length: 64:54
- Labels: Rhino, Elektra
- Producers: Mark Abramson, David Anderle, Arif Mardin, Jac Holzman, Judy Collins

Judy Collins chronology
Classic Folk (2000)	The Very Best of Judy Collins (2001)	Judy Collins Sings Leonard Cohen: Democracy (2004)

Professional ratings
Review scores
Source	Rating
AllMusic	4.5/5 stars

The Very Best of Judy Collins is a greatest hits album by singer/songwriter Judy Collins. It includes highlights of her career through 1975. All tracks are taken from her Elektra studio albums with one exception, the single version of Collins' biggest hit "Both Sides Now", which peaked at No. 8 on the Billboard singles chart.

== Track listing ==
1. "Turn! Turn! Turn!" (Pete Seeger) – 3:40
2. "So Early, Early in the Spring" (Traditional) – 3:12
3. "Suzanne" (Leonard Cohen) – 4:26
4. "Just Like Tom Thumb's Blues" (Bob Dylan) – 5:08
5. "Both Sides Now" (Joni Mitchell) – 3:16
6. "Since You Asked" (Judy Collins) – 2:37
7. "Albatross" (Collins) – 4:53
8. "My Father" (Collins) – 5:02
9. "Someday Soon" (Ian Tyson) – 3:47
10. "Who Knows Where the Time Goes?" (Sandy Denny) – 4:47
11. "Chelsea Morning" (Mitchell) – 3:21
12. "Farewell to Tarwathie" (Traditional) – 4:58
13. "Song for Judith (Open the Door)" (Collins) – 4:07
14. "Cook with Honey" (Valerie Carter) – 3:31
15. "Send in the Clowns" (Stephen Sondheim) – 4:03
16. "Amazing Grace" (John Newton) – 4:06
