= Judy Collins Sings Leonard Cohen: Democracy =

Studio album by Judy Collins
- Released: 2004
- Genre: Folk
- Length: 57:51
- Label: Elektra

Judy Collins chronology
Judy Collins Live at Wolf Trap (2000)	Judy Collins Sings Leonard Cohen: Democracy (2004)	Portrait of an American Girl (2005)

Professional ratings
Review scores
Source	Rating
The Encyclopedia of Popular Music	3/5 stars

Judy Collins Sings Leonard Cohen: Democracy is an album by Judy Collins, released in 2004. It collected songs written by Leonard Cohen (or in the case of "Song of Bernadette", co-written with Jennifer Warnes and Bill Elliott) from Collins' previous albums, as well as four previously unreleased recordings.

== Track listing ==
1. "Democracy" – 6:55 (new recording)
2. "Suzanne" – 4:23 (from In My Life, 1966)
3. "A Thousand Kisses Deep" – 5:42 (new recording)
4. "Hey, That's No Way to Say Goodbye" – 3:34 (from Wildflowers, 1967)
5. "Dress Rehearsal Rag" – 5:23 (from In My Life, 1966)
6. "Priests" – 4:58 (from Wildflowers, 1967)
7. "Night Comes On" – 4:03 (new recording)
8. "Sisters of Mercy – 2:34 (from Wildflowers, 1967)
9. "Story of Isaac" – 3:33 (from Who Knows Where the Time Goes, 1968)
10. "Bird on a Wire" – 4:40 (from Who Knows Where the Time Goes, 1968)
11. "Famous Blue Raincoat" – 5:37 (from Living, 1971)
12. "Joan of Arc" – 5:57 (from Living, 1971)
13. "Take This Longing" – 5:26 (from Bread and Roses, 1976)
14. "Song of Bernadette" – 4:13 (previously unreleased live recording from 1999)

== Reception ==
AllMusic said that "the title tack opens the record with its jarring modernity of programmed drums and keyboards and is immediately followed by the original recording of "Suzanne," only to be book-ended with a stunning reading of "A Thousand Kisses Deep," full of modern production and Collins emotionally loaded, sensual performance ... this collection speaks volumes not only to Collins' considerable gifts as an interpretive singer, but more than this, to the fact that her voice, at once instantly recognizable, has lost none of its empathy, its steely conviction, or its aching vulnerability."
