= White Bird: Anthology of Favorites =

Compilation album by Judy Collins
- Released: May 7, 2021
- Genre: Folk; pop
- Length: 40:10
- Label: Cleopatra
- Producer: Alan Silverman; Judy Collins

Judy Collins chronology
Winter Stories (2020)	White Bird: Anthology of Favorites (2021)	Spellbound (2022)

Singles from White Bird: Anthology of Favorites
- 1. "White Bird" Released: March 19, 2021

White Bird: Anthology of Favorites is a compilation album by American singer-songwriter Judy Collins, released on May 7, 2021, on Cleopatra Records.

== Overview ==
The album features classic Judy Collins hits like "Chelsea Morning", "Turn! Turn! Turn!" and "I Think It's Going to Rain Today" with new arrangements. Many of the songs have already been released on various albums released by the singer after the termination of her contract with Elektra Records in the mid-80s.

The album also included a brand new, never-before-released "White Bird", a cover version of a song by the San Francisco hippie rock band It's a Beautiful Day, which was released as a single on March 19.

Guests on the album include Stephen Stills, Willie Nelson and Joan Baez.

In support of the album, the singer went on tour.

== Critical reception ==
Professional ratings
Review scores
Source	Rating
Uncut	6/10

The reviewer of Folk Alley stated that there is not a single false note on the album, and a selection of Collins' songs once again illustrates her gift to live in a song and gently inhale the spirit of love and beauty. Jim Wirth of Uncut gave the album a score of 6 out of 10, noting that is "a portrait of the artist in lockdown. A caged thing for the moment, but watch her fly."

== Track listing ==
No.	Title	Writer(s)	Length
1.	"White Bird"	David LaFlamme; Linda LaFlamme	4:11
2.	"Chelsea Morning"	Joni Mitchell	3:19
3.	"Turn! Turn! Turn! (To Everything There Is a Season)"	Pete Seeger	4:07
4.	"Pack Up Your Sorrows"	Richard Fariña; Pauline Marden	3:26
5.	"When I Go" (with Willie Nelson)	Dave Carter	4:27
6.	"I Think It's Going to Rain Today"	Randy Newman	4:07
7.	"Last Thing On My Mind" (with Stephen Stills)	Tom Paxton	2:57
8.	"Blackbird"	John Lennon; Paul McCartney	2:28
9.	"Both Sides Now"	Mitchell	3:28
10.	"Diamonds and Rust" (with Joan Baez)	Joan Baez	3:35
11.	"Send In the Clowns"	Stephen Sondheim	4:05
Total length:			40:10
