= So Early in the Spring (Judy Collins album) =

So Early in the Spring... The First 15 Years

Compilation album by Judy Collins
- Released: 1977
- Genre: Folk
- Label: Elektra
- Producer: Mark Abramson, David Anderle, Jac Holzman, Ann Purtill, Arif Mardin

Judy Collins chronology
Bread and Roses (1976)	So Early in the Spring... The First 15 Years (1977)	Hard Times for Lovers (1979)

Professional ratings
Review scores
Source	Rating
AllMusic	4.5/5 stars
The Encyclopedia of Popular Music	4/5 stars
The Rolling Stone Album Guide	4/5 stars

So Early in the Spring... The First 15 Years, (or simply So Early in the Spring) is a compilation album by American singer and songwriter Judy Collins, first released as a double LP in 1977. It peaked at No. 42 on the Billboard Pop Albums charts. The LP featured album portraits by renowned photographer Richard Avedon.

Although it is out-of-print, all the songs are available on other releases or compilations.

== Track listing ==
(LP Side One; Cassette Side One)

1. "Pretty Polly" (on LP, not on Cassette release) (Traditional) 5:49
2. "So Early, Early in the Spring" (Traditional) 3:10
3. "Pretty Saro" (Traditional) 3:05
4. "Golden Apples of the Sun" (William Butler Yeats, "Song of the Wandering Oengus") 3:55
5. "Bonnie Ship the Diamond" (Traditional, arranged by Judy Collins) 2:17
6. "Farewell to Tarwathie" (Traditional) 5:08

(LP Side Two; Cassette Side One, continued)

1. "The Hostage" (Tom Paxton) 2:49
2. "La Colombe" (Jacques Brel) 5:05
3. "Coal Tattoo" (Billy Edd Wheeler) 3:04
4. "Carry It On" (Gil Turner) 2:49
5. "Bread and Roses" (Music, 1976, by Mimi Fariña; Poem, 1912, by James Oppenheim) 3:06
6. "Marat/Sade" (Musical setting by Richard Peaslee, Peter Weiss, Geoffrey Skelton and Adrian Mitchell; Play by Peter Shaffer) 5:38

(LP Side Three; Cassette Side Two)

1. "Special Delivery" (Billy Mernit) 3:50
2. "The Lovin' of the Game" (Pat Garvey and Victoria Garvey Armstrong) 3:05
3. "Both Sides Now" (Joni Mitchell) 3:14
4. "Marieke" (Jacques Brel, Gerard Jouannest) 3:14
5. "Send In The Clowns" (Stephen Sondheim) 4:01
6. "Bird on the Wire" (Leonard Cohen) 4:39

(LP Side Four; Cassette Side Two, continued)

1. "Since You Asked" (Judy Collins) 2:34
2. "Born To The Breed" (Judy Collins) 4:50
3. "My Father" (Judy Collins) 5:02
4. "Holly Ann" (Judy Collins) 4:47
5. "Houses" (Judy Collins) 4:37
6. "Secret Gardens" (Judy Collins) 5:35

== Personnel ==
- Judy Collins – vocals, guitar, piano, keyboards

== Production notes ==
- Produced by Mark Abramson, David Anderle, Jac Holzman, Ann Purtill, Arif Mardin
- Engineered by Glenn Berger, John Haeny, David Jones, Jay Messina, Phil Ramone, John Wood, Shelly Yakus

== Charts ==
Chart performance for So Early in the Spring
Chart (1977)	Peak position
Canada Top Albums (RPM)	59
US Top LPs & Tape (Billboard)	42
US Top 100 Albums (Cash Box)	38
US The Album Chart (Record World)	72
