= Recollections =

Compilation album by Judy Collins
- Released: 1969
- Genre: Folk
- Length: 40:49
- Label: Elektra
- Producer: Mark Abramson

Judy Collins chronology
Who Knows Where the Time Goes (1968)	Recollections (1969)	Whales & Nightingales (1970)

Professional ratings
Review scores
Source	Rating
AllMusic	4/5 stars
Encyclopedia of Popular Music	4/5 stars
The Great Rock Discography	7/10 stars
MusicHound	3.5/5 stars
The Rolling Stone Album Guide	3.5/5 stars

Recollections (sometimes subtitled The Best of Judy Collins) is a collection of the best songs by American singer Judy Collins, released in 1969 by Elektra Records. In the same year, the label released a reissue of the album titled Judy with a different cover, but the same tracklist.

== Track listing ==
No.	Title	Writer(s)	Length
1.	"Pack Up Your Sorrows"	Richard Fariña; Pauline Marden	3:10
2.	"Tomorrow Is a Long Time"	Bob Dylan	4:04
3.	"Early Morning Rain"	Gordon Lightfoot	3:10
4.	"Anathea"	Lydia Wood	4:00
5.	"Turn! Turn! Turn! (To Everything There Is a Season)"	Pete Seeger	3:35
6.	"Daddy You've Been on My Mind"	Dylan	2:52
7.	"Mr. Tambourine Man"	Dylan	5:20
8.	"Winter Sky"	Billy Edd Wheeler	3:44
9.	"The Last Thing on My Mind"	Tom Paxton	3:25
10.	"The Bells of Rhymney"	Idris Davies; Seeger	4:04
11.	"Farewell"	Dylan	3:25
Total length:			40:49

== Charts ==
Weekly chart performance for Recollections
Chart (1969)	Peak position
Canada LP Chart (RPM)	17
US Top LP's (Billboard)	29
US Top 100 Albums (Cash Box)	26
US Top 100 LP's (Record World)	24
