= The Judy Collins Concert =

Live album by Judy Collins
- Released: July 1964
- Recorded: March 21, 1964
- Venue: The Town Hall, New York City
- Genre: Folk
- Label: Elektra
- Producer: Jac Holzman, Mark Abramson

Judy Collins chronology
Judy Collins #3 (1963)	The Judy Collins Concert (1964)	Fifth Album (1965)

Professional ratings
Review scores
Source	Rating
AllMusic	3.5/5 stars
The Encyclopedia of Popular Music	2/5 stars
The Rolling Stone Album Guide	2.5/5 stars

The Judy Collins Concert is a 1964 live album by American singer and songwriter Judy Collins, which included combined traditional folk material with songs by Bob Dylan and Tom Paxton. It was recorded on March 21, 1964, at the Town Hall in New York City.

With the exception of "Hey, Nelly, Nelly", none of the songs had been previously recorded by Collins.

== Track listing ==
Side one

1. "Winter Sky" (Billy Edd Wheeler) – 3:44
2. "The Last Thing on My Mind" (Tom Paxton) – 3:25
3. "Tear Down the Walls" (Fred Neil) – 2:18
4. "Bonnie Boy Is Young" – 4:11
5. "Me and My Uncle" (John Phillips) – 2:46
6. "Wild Rippling Water" – 3:23
7. "The Lonesome Death of Hattie Carroll" (Bob Dylan) – 5:28

Side two

1. "My Ramblin' Boy" (Paxton) – 4:58
2. "Red-Winged Blackbird" (Wheeler) – 2:15
3. "Coal Tattoo" (Wheeler) – 2:48
4. "Cruel Mother" – 5:43
5. "Bottle of Wine" (Paxton) – 2:23
6. "Medgar Evers Lullaby" (Richard Weissman) – 3:35
7. "Hey, Nelly, Nelly" (Jim Friedman, Shel Silverstein) – 2:59

== Personnel ==
- Judy Collins – guitar, keyboards, vocals

Additional musicians

- Chuck Israels – bass, cello
- Steve Mandell – second guitar, banjo

Technical

- Harold Leventhal – presenter
- Jac Holzman – producer
- Mark Abramson – producer, editing
- David B. Jones – engineer
- William S. Harvey – cover design
- Jim Marshall – cover photo
- Jack Goddard – liner notes
