= You Can't Buy Love =

You Can't Buy Love may refer to:

- "You Can't Buy Love", song by Judy Collins from Portrait of an American Girl 2005
- "You Can't Buy Love", song by the rock band Angel from Sinful (album)
- "You Can't Buy Love", song by Shania Twain from Now (Shania Twain album)
