= Living (Judy Collins album) =

Live album by Judy Collins
- Released: November 1971
- Recorded: 1970, various US concert dates
- Genre: Folk
- Length: 42:43
- Label: Elektra
- Producer: Mark Abramson

Judy Collins chronology
Whales & Nightingales (1970)	Living (1971)	Colors of the Day (1972)

Professional ratings
Review scores
Source	Rating
AllMusic	3/5 stars
The Encyclopedia of Popular Music	3/5 stars
The Rolling Stone Album Guide	3.5/5 stars

Living is a 1971 live album by American singer and songwriter Judy Collins, released by Elektra Records in 1971. The album is taken from performances on the singer's 1970 concert tour. It peaked at No. 64 on the Billboard 200 charts.

In addition to Collins' own work, the album includes songs by Bob Dylan, Joni Mitchell and Leonard Cohen, as well as a song co-written with Stacy Keach.

== Track listing ==
Side one

1. "Joan of Arc" (Leonard Cohen) – 5:55
2. "Four Strong Winds" (Ian Tyson) – 3:45
3. "Vietnam Love Song" (Arnold Black, Eric Bentley) – 3:56
4. "Innisfree" (W. B. Yeats, Hamilton Camp) – 3:16
5. "Song for Judith (Open the Door)" (Judy Collins) – 4:05

Side two

1. "All Things Are Quite Silent" (Arranged and adapted by Collins) – 2:47
2. "Easy Times" (Stacy Keach, Collins) – 3:25
3. "Chelsea Morning" (Joni Mitchell) – 3:15
4. "Famous Blue Raincoat" (Cohen) – 5:34
5. "Just Like Tom Thumb's Blues" (Bob Dylan) – 6:45

== Personnel ==
- Judy Collins – piano (tracks 2, 4–5), acoustic guitar (tracks 1, 3, 6, 8–9), vocals

Additional musicians

- Ry Cooder – second guitar (track 2), electric guitar (tracks 5, 10), acoustic guitar (track 7)
- Susan Evans – drums and percussion (tracks 1, 3, 6, 8–9), vocals
- Gene Taylor – bass (tracks 1, 3, 6, 8–9), vocals
- Richard Bell – piano (tracks 1, 3, 6, 8–9), vocals

Chorus singers on "Song for Judith"

- Nancy Carlen, Randy Nauert, Fritz Richmond, Bob Zachary, Cheryl, Eileen, Elizabeth Thompson, Susan Evans, Richard Bell, Gene Taylor, Jac Holzman, Vanessa Chartoff, John Cooke
- Big Sur Choir: Ruth Stevens, Rita Gatti, Tom Carvey, Paul Johnson, Glenda Bickel

Technical

- Mark Abramson – producer
- John Haeny – engineer
- Bill Harvey – cover design
- Peter Lerner – cover photo
- Judy Collins – collage design
- Wally Heider – remote recording facilities

== Charts ==
Weekly chart performance for Living
Chart (1972)	Peak position
Canada Top 100 Albums (RPM)	49
US Top LP's (Billboard)	64
US Top 100 Albums (Cash Box)	45
US The Album Chart (Record World)	47
