= The Song of Bernadette =

The Song of Bernadette may refer to:

- The Song of Bernadette (novel), a 1941 novel by Franz Werfel
- The Song of Bernadette (film), a 1943 adaptation of Werfel's novel, by Henry King
- "Song of Bernadette" (song), by Jennifer Warnes, 1986
