= Whales & Nightingales =

Studio album by Judy Collins
- Released: November 1970
- Recorded: 1970
- Studios: Fedco Audio Labs, Providence, Rhode Island
- Genre: Folk
- Length: 42:32
- Label: Elektra
- Producer: Mark Abramson

Judy Collins chronology
| Who Knows Where the Time Goes (1968) | Whales & Nightingales (1970) | Living (1971) |

Singles from Whales & Nightingales
- 1. "Amazing Grace" Released: 1970; 2. "Time Passes Slowly" Released: 1970

Professional ratings
Review scores
| Source | Rating |
|---|---|
| AllMusic | 3.5/5 stars |
| The Encyclopedia of Popular Music | 3/5 stars |
| The Rolling Stone Album Guide | 4/5 stars |
| The Village Voice | C+ |

Whales & Nightingales is the eighth studio album by American singer and songwriter Judy Collins, released by Elektra Records in 1970. It peaked at No. 17 on the Billboard Pop Albums chart.

The album includes material by Bob Dylan, Pete Seeger, Jacques Brel and Joan Baez, as well as Collins' top-forty version of "Amazing Grace", and the traditional "Farewell to Tarwathie", on which Collins sang to the accompaniment of humpback whales.

In 1971, the album was certified Gold by the RIAA for sales of over 500,000 copies in the US.

== Track listing ==
Side one

1. "A Song for David" (Joan Baez) – 3:25
2. "Sons Of" (Eric Blau, Jacques Brel, Gérard Jouannest, Mort Shuman; arranged and adapted by Joshua Rifkin) – 2:21
3. "The Patriot Game" (Dominic Behan) – 4:05
4. "Prothalamium" (Michael Sahl, Aaron Kramer; arranged and adapted by Rifkin) – 1:37
5. "Oh, Had I a Golden Thread" (Pete Seeger) – 3:55
6. "Gene's Song" (Traditional; arranged and adapted by Gene Murrow) – 1:23
7. "Farewell to Tarwathie" (Traditional; arranged and adapted by Judy Collins) – 5:13

Side two

1. "Time Passes Slowly" (Bob Dylan) – 3:30
2. "Marieke" (Jacques Brel, Gérard Jouannest; arranged and adapted by Rifkin) – 3:12
3. "Nightingale I" (Collins) – 2:14
4. "Nightingale II" (Collins, Rifkin) – 5:16
5. "Simple Gifts" (Traditional; arranged and adapted by Collins) – 1:28
6. "Amazing Grace" (John Newton; arranged and adapted by Collins) – 4:04

== Personnel ==
- Judy Collins – guitar, keyboards, vocals

Additional musicians
All duties are unspecified in liner notes.

- Richard Bell
- Susan Evans
- David Grisman
- Paul Harris
- Bill Lee
- Jerry Matthews
- Gene Murrow
- John Nagy
- Paul Prestopino
- David Rea
- Joshua Rifkin
- Warren Smith
- Gene Taylor
- Greg Thomas

Technical

- Mark Abramson – producer
- John Haeny – engineer, assistant producer
- Joshua Rifkin – arranger and conductor (tracks 2, 4, 9, 11)
- John Nagy – string arrangement (track 8)
- William S. Harvey – cover concept, art direction
- Herb Goro – photography
- Greg Fulginiti – recording assistant

== Charts ==
Chart performance for Whales & Nightingales
| Chart (1970–1971) | Peak position |
|---|---|
| Australian Albums (Kent Music Report) | 26 |
| Canada Top 100 Albums (RPM) | 14 |
| UK Albums (Official Charts) | 16 |
| US Top LP's (Billboard) | 17 |
| US Top 100 Albums (Cash Box) | 15 |
| US The Album Chart (Record World) | 14 |

== Certifications and sales ==
Certifications for Whales & Nightingales
| Region | Certification | Certified units/sales |
|---|---|---|
| United States (RIAA) | Gold | 500,000^{^} |
^{^} Shipments figures based on certification alone.
