= Monday Michiru discography =

The discography of Japanese American singer Monday Michiru includes several studio albums, EPs, compilations and remix projects, and numerous singles released since her debut solo recording in 1991.

== Studio albums ==
Year	Title	Record label
1991	Mangetsu	Virgin
1994	Maiden Japan	Kitty/Universal
1995	Jazz Brat	Kitty/Universal
1998	Double Image	Universal
1999	Optimista	Universal
2000	4 Seasons	Universal
2002	Episodes in Color	Sony Music
2003	Moods	Quality Records
2004	Naked Breath	ArtistShare
2005	Routes	ArtistShare
2007	Alternate Routes	ArtistShare
2007	My Ever Changing Moods	Geneon Universal
2008	Nexus	Pony Canyon
2011	Don't Disturb This Groove	Grand Gallery
2012	Soulception	Adventure Music
2013	Brasilified	Adventure Music
2015	Jazz Conversations	Victor Entertainment

== EPs ==
Year	Title	Record label
1992	Naked With You	NEC Avenue
1995	Sunshine After the Rain	Kitty/Universal
1996	Broken Tears	Kitty/Universal
1998	Mermaid	Kitty/Universal
1998	You Make Me	Kitty/Universal
1999	Yellow Bird	Universal
1999	Play It by Ear	Universal
1999	Tomorrow's Sunrise	Universal
1999	Higher	Universal
2000	New Beginnings	Universal
2000	Chasing After the Sun	Universal
2000	Fallin'	Universal
2000	Introspection	Universal

== Remix and compilation albums ==
Year	Title	Record label
1994	Groovement	Kitty/Universal
1994	Double Groovement	Kitty/Universal
1996	Adoption Agency	Kitty/Universal
1996	Look into the Past (To See the Future) '91-'97	Kitty/Universal
1996	Delicious Poison	Kitty/Universal
1999	Premiumix	Universal
2001	Selections 1997-2000	Universal
2001	Recollections	Universal
2002	Look Into the Past (To See the Future) 2	Universal
2005	Free Soul Collection	SIGMA/Universal

== Promos ==
Year	Title	Record label
1999	Collage '99 (VHS)	Kitty/Universal
