= True Stories and Other Dreams =

Studio album by Judy Collins
- Released: January 1973
- Recorded: 1972
- Studio: The Record Plant, New York City
- Genre: Folk
- Length: 40:17
- Label: Elektra
- Producer: Mark Abramson

Judy Collins chronology
Colors of the Day (1972)	True Stories and Other Dreams (1973)	Judith (1975)

Professional ratings
Review scores
Source	Rating
AllMusic	3/5 stars
The Encyclopedia of Popular Music	3/5 stars
The Rolling Stone Album Guide	3/5 stars

True Stories and Other Dreams is the ninth studio album by American singer and songwriter Judy Collins, released by Elektra Records in 1973. It peaked at No. 27 on the Billboard Pop Albums charts.

The album included Valerie Carter's "Cook with Honey", which returned Collins to the U.S. pop singles top-forty, as well as Tom Paxton's song "The Hostage" about the 1971 Attica Prison riots. It also included a number of Collins' own compositions, including "The Fisherman Song", which she would later perform on Sesame Street.

== Track listing ==
All tracks composed by Judy Collins; except where indicated

1. "Cook with Honey" (Valerie Carter) – 3:29
2. "So Begins the Task" (Stephen Stills) – 3:11
3. "Fishermen Song" – 3:56
4. "The Dealer (Down and Losin')" (Bob Ruzicka) – 3:55
5. "Secret Gardens" – 5:30
6. "Holly Ann" – 4:47
7. "The Hostage" (Tom Paxton) – 2:52
8. "Song for Martin" – 5:05
9. "Che" – 7:32

== Personnel ==
- Judy Collins – vocals, guitar, piano, keyboards
- Bob Daugherty, Russell George – bass guitar
- Bill Keith – steel guitar
- Louis Killen – concertina
- Steve Mandell, Jerry Matthews, Bucky Pizzarelli – guitar
- Ray Barretto – congas
- Don Brooks – harmonica
- Larry Packer – fiddle
- Paul Prestopino – harp
- Allan Schwartzberg – drums, percussion
- Eric Weissberg – guitar, banjo, bass guitar

== Production notes ==
- Produced by Mark Abramson
- Engineered by Shelly Yakus and Jay Messina

== Charts ==
Chart performance for True Stories and Other Dreams
Chart (1973)	Peak position
Canada Top 100 Albums (RPM)	9
US Top LP's & Tape (Billboard)	27
US Top 100 Albums (Cash Box)	23
US The Album Chart (Record World)	31
