= Judy Collins Sings Lennon and McCartney =

Judy Collins Sings Lennon & McCartney

Studio album by Judy Collins
- Released: July 17, 2007
- Label: Wildflower
- Producer: Judy Collins, Alan Silverman

Judy Collins chronology
Portrait of an American Girl (2005)	Judy Collins Sings Lennon & McCartney (2007)	Paradise (2010)

Judy Collins Sings Lennon and McCartney is a Beatles tribute album by Judy Collins released by Wildflowers Records in 2007.

Collins first covered the Beatles in 1966, the song "In My Life" for her album which was also named after the song.

In the liner notes in the enclosed booklet, the eleventh track ("I'll Follow the Sun") is mistakenly identified as "Good Day Sunshine".

== Track listing ==
All tracks composed by John Lennon and Paul McCartney.

1. "And I Love Her" - 2:58
2. "Blackbird" - 2:28
3. "Golden Slumbers" - 3:40
4. "Penny Lane" - 2:55
5. "Norwegian Wood" - 2:52
6. "When I'm Sixty-Four" - 2:41
7. "Good Day Sunshine" - 2:28
8. "Hey Jude" - 4:28
9. "We Can Work It Out" - 2:23
10. "Yesterday" - 2:26
11. "I'll Follow the Sun" - 2:11
12. "Long & Winding Road" - 3:19
