= Louis Nelson (artist) =

American industrial designer and graphic artist (1936–2024)

- Born: October 8, 1936; New York City, U.S.
- Died: December 4, 2024 (aged 88); New York City, U.S.
- Education: Pratt Institute
- Occupation: Industrial designer
- Years active: 1965–2024
- Notable work: Korean War Veterans Memorial; Dag Hammarskjöld Medal
- Spouse: Judy Collins (m. 1996)
- Website: www.louisnelson.com

Louis Nelson (October 8, 1936 – December 4, 2024) was an American industrial designer and graphic artist who is best known for designing the Mural Wall for the Korean War Veterans Memorial on the National Mall in Washington.

== Early life and career ==
Nelson was born in New York City, to Norwegian American parents. He graduated with a degree in Industrial Design from Pratt Institute in New York City in 1958.

From 1958 until 1962 he served in the US military, where he became a captain and helicopter instructor. After the Army, he returned to the Pratt Institute, where he graduated with a master's degree in Industrial Design in 1964.

Nelson designed the Mural Wall of the Korean War Veterans Memorial located in Washington. He also designed the Dag Hammarskjöld Medal, as well as the nutrition facts label that appears on food packages in America.

== Personal life and death ==
In April 1996, he married musician Judy Collins, whom he had been seeing since 1978. They lived in Manhattan.

Nelson was diagnosed with cancer on November 22, 2024, while being treated for a fall. He died of the disease at a Manhattan hospital 12 days later, on December 4, at the age of 88.

== Awards and recognition ==
Louis Nelson had been honored by several industry designer organizations and magazines:

- 2013: Career Achievement Award, Pratt Institute
- AIGA
- Industrial Design Excellence Award: Silver
- American Corporate Identity
- Art Directors Club (NY & LA)
- British Design & Art Direction
- Clio Awards
- IABC
