= Wildflowers (Judy Collins album) =

Studio album by Judy Collins
- Released: October 1967
- Genre: Folk
- Length: 35:44
- Label: Elektra
- Producer: Mark Abramson

Judy Collins chronology
In My Life (1966)	Wildflowers (1967)	Who Knows Where the Time Goes (1968)

Singles from Wildflowers
- 1. "Both Sides Now" Released: October 1968

Professional ratings
Review scores
Source	Rating
AllMusic	3/5 stars
The Encyclopedia of Popular Music	4/5 stars
The Rolling Stone Album Guide	4/5 stars

Wildflowers is the sixth studio album by American singer and songwriter Judy Collins, released by Elektra Records in 1967. It is her highest-charting album, reaching No. 5 on the Billboard 200. It includes Collins' version of Joni Mitchell's "Both Sides, Now", which peaked at No. 8 on the Billboard Hot 100.

The album was arranged by Joshua Rifkin and produced by Mark Abramson. Collins' recording of "Albatross" was used in the 1968 film adaptation of The Subject Was Roses. It was one of three self-penned tracks that appeared on the album, the first time that Collins wrote her own material. The collection also features three Leonard Cohen-penned tracks, including "Priests", a composition Cohen never released himself.

In 1969, Wildflowers was certified Gold by the RIAA for sales of over 500,000 copies in the US.

== Track listing ==
Side one
No.	Title	Writer(s)	Length
1.	"Michael from Mountains"	Joni Mitchell	3:10
2.	"Since You Asked"	Judy Collins	2:34
3.	"Sisters of Mercy"	Leonard Cohen	2:31
4.	"Priests"	Cohen	4:55
5.	"A Ballata of Francesco Landini - Lasso! di donna"	Francesco Landini	4:34

Side two
No.	Title	Writer(s)	Length
1.	"Both Sides Now"	Mitchell	3:14
2.	"La chanson des vieux amants (The Song of Old Lovers)"	Jacques Brel	4:40
3.	"Sky Fell"	Collins	1:47
4.	"Albatross"	Collins	4:51
5.	"Hey, That's No Way to Say Goodbye"	Cohen	3:28

== Personnel ==
- Judy Collins – guitar, keyboards, vocals

Technical

- Joshua Rifkin – arranger (tracks 1–3, 5–10), conductor
- Robert Sylvester – arranger (track 4)
- Robert Dennis – arranger (track 4)
- Mark Abramson – producer
- John Haeny – engineer
- Guy Webster – front cover photography
- Jim Frawley – back cover photography
- William S. Harvey – art direction, design

== Charts ==
=== Weekly charts ===
Weekly chart performance for Wildflowers
Chart (1968–1969)	Peak position
Canada Top 50 Albums (RPM)	5
US Top LP's (Billboard)	5
US Top 100 Albums (Cash Box)	8
US Top 100 LP's (Record World)	7

=== Year-end charts ===
Year-end chart performance for Wildflowers
Chart (1969)	Position
US Top LP's (Billboard)	74
US Top 100 Albums (Cash Box)	32

== Certifications and sales ==
Certifications for Wildflowers
Region	Certification	Certified units/sales
United States (RIAA)	Gold	500,000^{^}
^{^} Shipments figures based on certification alone.
