= John Haeny =

American recording and mixing engineer, and sound designer

- Born: Omaha, Nebraska, US
- Died: September 19, 2023; Hobart, Tasmania, Australia
- Education: Brooks Institute of Photography
- Occupations: Producer, recording and mixing engineer, sound designer, academic
- Years active: 1960–2023
- Known for: Collaborations with The Doors, Jim Morrison, Judy Collins, Tom Jones, Jackson Browne, Little Feat, Joni Mitchell
- Website: johnhaeny.com

John Haeny (1941 – 19 September 2023) was an American-born record producer, recording engineer, mixing engineer, sound designer, and academic. Over a career spanning several decades, he contributed to a broad range of recording projects, working on albums by The Doors, Judy Collins, Linda Ronstadt, and Jackson Browne, among others. His work appeared on several recordings that received Gold record and Platinum record certifications, including An American Prayer by The Doors, which achieved Platinum status in the United States.

In addition to his impact on the music industry, Haeny made notable contributions to film and television sound production. While based in Sydney, he served as a sound editor and sound designer on projects such as the television series Dallas and Twin Peaks, and on films including Scent of a Woman, While You Were Sleeping, Robin Hood: Prince of Thieves, and Beauty and the Beast.

In 2003, he relocated from Sydney to Tasmania, where he established Sunny Hills Studios on his 10-acre (4.0 ha) property in Glen Huon. He continued his work at the studio until his death in Hobart following a short illness.

== Early life and education ==
During his teenage years, Haeny developed an interest in photography while studying in high school. He later attended the Brooks Institute of Photography in Santa Barbara, California, where he earned a degree in portrait photography.

== Music career ==
Haeny's career in music production began in the 1960s. He worked as a recording engineer and producer, collaborating with numerous artists across various genres. In 1963, he relocated to San Francisco, where he worked with local bands, including those signed to the Tempo/Autumn record label. He later moved to Los Angeles, where he contributed to projects such as I'm a Believer by The Monkees, a single that became a commercial success.

Throughout the 1970s, Haeny worked with artists such as Judy Collins, Jackson Browne, Linda Ronstadt, and Little Feat, earning multiple Gold and Platinum certifications for his contributions. In 1978, he was responsible for producing and engineering An American Prayer, an album that featured recordings of Jim Morrison's poetry set to music by the surviving members of The Doors.

== Film and television career ==
In the mid-1980s, Haeny transitioned into film and television sound production, working as a sound editor and sound designer. His credits included work on series such as Dallas and Twin Peaks, as well as feature films like Scent of a Woman and Robin Hood: Prince of Thieves. He was nominated for five Primetime Emmy Awards in recognition of his work in sound editing.

== Later career ==
From 2003 until his passing in 2023, Haeny operated Sunny Hills Studios on his 10-acre (4.0 ha) property in Glen Huon, Tasmania, Australia. His studio was home to a 5.1 Pro Tools mixing facility, and he worked as a beta tester for Waves Audio, co-developing the Kramer Master Tape plugin.

== Notable productions ==
=== Album production ===
Year	Artist	Album	RIAA Certification
1967	Judy Collins	Wildflowers	Gold
1968	Judy Collins	Who Knows Where the Time Goes	Gold
1968	The Doors	Waiting for the Sun	Platinum
1970	Joni Mitchell	Song to a Seagull	No Certification
1970	Judy Collins	Whales & Nightingales	Gold
1972	Judy Collins	Colors of the Day	Platinum
1973	Jackson Browne	For Everyman	Platinum
1973	Kris Kristofferson and Rita Coolidge	Full Moon	Gold
1973	Linda Ronstadt	Don't Cry Now	Platinum
1973	Little Feat	Dixie Chicken	Gold
1974	Linda Ronstadt	Heart Like a Wheel	Multi-Platinum (x2)
1974	Little Feat	Feats Don't Fail Me Now	Gold
1976	Jackson Browne	The Pretender	Multi-Platinum (x2)
1976	Linda Ronstadt	Greatest Hits	Multi-Platinum (x5)
1978	Jim Morrison and The Doors	An American Prayer	Platinum
1978	Warren Zevon	Warren Zevon	No Certification
1980	The Doors	Greatest Hits	Platinum (x3)
1980	Linda Ronstadt	Greatest Hits, Volume 2	Platinum
1985	The Doors	The Best of The Doors	Diamond (Platinum x10)
1991	The Doors	In Concert	Platinum (x2)
1991	The Doors	The Doors (soundtrack)	Platinum

=== Emmy Nominations ===
Year	Nominee / work	Award	Result
1987	Fresno as Sound Editor	Outstanding Sound Editing for a Miniseries or a Special	Nominated
1990	Twin Peaks as Sound Editor	Outstanding Sound Editing for a Series	Nominated
1991	Separate but Equal as Sound Editor	Outstanding Sound Editing for a Miniseries or a Special	Nominated
1992	Wedlock as Sound Editor	Outstanding Individual Achievement in Sound Editing for a Miniseries or a Special	Nominated
1995	Earth 2 (TV series) as Sound Editor	Outstanding Sound Editing for a Series	Nominated
