= Winter Stories (Judy Collins, Jonas Fjeld and Chatham County Line album) =

Studio album by Judy Collins, Jonas Fjeld and Chatham County Line
- Released: November 29, 2019
- Recorded: 2019
- Studio: Echo Mountain Studios
- Genre: Folk; bluegrass
- Length: 49:19
- Label: Cleopatra Records, Wildflower

Judy Collins chronology
Everybody Knows (2017)	Winter Stories (2019)	Spellbound (2022)

Jonas Fjeld chronology
Western Harmonies (2013)	Winter Stories (2019)

Chatham County Line chronology
Autumn (2017)	Winter Stories (2019)	Strange Fascination (2020)

Winter Stories is an album by American singer Judy Collins and Norwegian musician Jonas Fjeld backed by American blugrass group Chatham County Line. It was released on November 29, 2019, on the Cleopatra label and reached number one on the Billboard Top Bluegrass Albums chart, becoming the 80-year-old Collins' first ever American number one album on any chart, as well as the first for Fjeld and the third for Chatham County Line.

== Background and recording ==
Although the lead artists were tangentially aware of one another (Collins recorded Fjeld's "Angels in the Snow" for her 2014 album Christmas with Judy Collins), they had never worked together. Fjeld had previously toured with and recorded three albums with Chatham County Line. Of choosing her collaborators, Collins explained "I knew Jonas and Chatham County Line would be a great fit with me. The language of music overarches everything, including geography. When we came together in the studio, we found we could speak to each other in a way that was compatible and nuanced." She concluded that she "was very honored to work with this all-star group" as "there was definitely a lot of love and admiration between everyone, and we had such a great time together". Collins also expressed that she enjoyed making a winter-themed album that was not simply an album of Christmas songs.

The recording of the album took place in February 2019 at Echo Mountain Studios, a former church in Asheville, North Carolina where the artists were given three days of preparation and pre-recording time during which they picked the songs, a mixture of classics, covers and originals through sharing stories and exchanging experiences, something Collins described as "very much a part of the folk tradition.” Of the album's seasonal theme, Fjeld explained "I’m a winter guy — in my part of the world it's winter seven months of the year. Winter is a wonderful time to be close to the ones you love”.

Songs on the album include re-recordings of Collins' "The Blizzard" and "Mountain Girl" from her 1990 album Fires of Eden and 1995 album Voices respectively and Fjeld's "Angel's in the Snow" as well as covers of Stan Rogers' "Northwest Passage, Jimmy Webb's "Highwayman" and Joni Mitchell's "River".

== Reception ==
Winter Stories was nominated for Best Country Album at the 2019 Spellemannprisen awards, often referred to as the Norwegian Grammy Awards.

The album received universal acclaim from music critics. Writing for Americana UK, Jonathan Aird selects "The Blizzard" as the album's standout track, explaining that it is "one of her most stunningly effective songs" detailing "love, and consolation, and drinking and an eventual parting captured over a magical six minutes" and also praises Collins' cover of "River", writing that "it's hard to imagine anyone else but Judy Collins making such a fine version of a song whose original perfection makes it almost sacrosanct". Aird additionally praises the "magical" re-recording of "Angels in the Snow", the "ethereal" cover of "Highwayman" and "Bury Me With My Guitar On" on which Chatham County Line "get to rip a little more as the song bounces along at a Bluegrass pelt". He concludes that "Winter Stories is an album that brings out the best of all participants – Judy Collins is in wonderful voice, Jonas Fjeld offers a dramatic counterpoint with the right edge of gruffness whilst the inspired combination of the duo with Chatham County Line adds a real connection back into Judy Collins’ early folk routes" before expressing his desire for further collaboration between the artists adding that " there are three other seasons to the year – just a thought Judy".

Similarly, Doug Heselgrave of No Depression described the album as a "new folk classic" featuring a "winning combination" of Collins, Fjeld and Chatham County Line.

== Track listing ==
Adapted from AllMusic

No.	Title	Writer(s)	Length
1.	"Northwest Passage"	Stan Rogers	4:57
2.	"Mountain Girl"	Judy Collins	4:45
3.	"Winter Stories"	Jonas Fjeld	4:42
4.	"Bury Me with My Guitar On"	Fjeld, Dave Wilson	3:01
5.	"River"	Joni Mitchell	4:00
6.	"Sweet Refrain"	Fjeld, Wilson	4:16
7.	"The Fallow Way"	Collins	4:03
8.	"Angels in the Snow"	Eric Anderson, Fjeld, Ole Paus	5:13
9.	"Highwayman"	Jimmy Webb	3:42
10.	"Frozen North"	Fjeld	4:35
11.	"The Blizzard"	Collins	6:05
Total length:			49:19

== Personnel ==
- Judy Collins - vocals, guitar, piano
- Jonas Fjeld - vocals, guitar

Chatham County Line

- Greg Reading - bass, organ, pedal steel, backing vocals
- John Teer - fiddle, mandolin, backing vocals
- Dave Wilson - guitar, backing vocals

Other musicians

- Bill Berg - drums
- Chandler Holt - banjo
- Øystein Rudi - hardanger fiddle
- Russell Walden - piano, string arrangements, backing vocals

Technical

- Sarah Beilenson - assistant engineer
- Josh Blake - assistant engineer
- Angela Dedominick - project assistant
- Katherine DePaul - executive producer
- Rachel Epp - project assistant
- Dowell Gandy - engineer
- Kenny Harrington - assistant engineer
- Frode Karlsen - artwork design
- Anders Midtbo - project assistant
- Paul Rolnick - mixing
- Rachel Selch - assistant engineer
- Mike Tierney - mixing
