= Farewell to Tarwathie =

Scottish folk song

"Farewell to Tarwathie" (Scots: Fareweel Tae Tarwathie; Roud number 2562) is a folk song written by George Scroggie in Aberdeenshire, Scotland around 1850. The piece is part of the collection The Peasant's Lyre, preserved in the Library of Congress, published in 1857 in Aberdeen, in which the poem Farewell to Tarwathie appears with 16 stanzas.

== Recordings ==
- 1966 – Gordon McIntyre, A Wench, a Whale and a Pint of Good Ale
- 1970 – Judy Collins, Whales and Nightingales
- 1971 – Ewan MacColl, on The Critics Group's album As We Were A-Sailing
- 1973 – Fungus (band), Farewell To Tarwathie
- 1975 – Liam Clancy, Farewell To Tarwathie (album), Plainsong Records – PS 1001, Canada
- 2008, "Fareweel Tae Tarwathie" by Bounding Main released on their 2008 album Going Overboard
- 2023, The Longest Johns, released on their Album "C-Sides"
