= Running for My Life =

Studio album by Judy Collins
- Released: 1980
- Genre: Folk
- Label: Elektra
- Producer: Judy Collins

Judy Collins chronology
Hard Times for Lovers (1979)	Running for My Life (1980)	Times of Our Lives (1982)

Running for My Life is a studio album by American singer and songwriter Judy Collins. It was released by Elektra Records in 1980. It peaked at No. 142 on the Billboard Pop Albums charts.

The version of "Marieke" found here is a new recording.

== Critical reception ==
Professional ratings
Review scores
Source	Rating
AllMusic	3.5/5 stars
The Encyclopedia of Popular Music	3/5 stars
The Rolling Stone Album Guide	2.5/5 stars

The Star Tribune noted that Collins "does sing with a bit more variety and toughness than in earlier times."

== Track listing ==
1. "Running for My Life" (Judy Collins)
2. "Bright Morning Star" (Arranged and adapted by Judy Collins)
3. "Green Finch and Linnet Bird" (Stephen Sondheim)
4. "Marieke" (Jacques Brel, Gérard Jouannest)
5. "Pretty Women" (Stephen Sondheim)
6. "Almost Free" (Hugh Prestwood)
7. "I Could Really Show You Around" (Peter Allen, Dean Pitchford)
8. "I've Done Enough Dyin' Today" (Larry Gatlin)
9. "Anyone Would Love You" (Harold Rome)
10. "The Rainbow Connection" (Kenneth Ascher, Paul Williams)
11. "This Is the Day" (Judy Collins)
12. "Wedding Song" (Judy Collins)

== Personnel ==
- Judy Collins – vocals, guitar, piano
- Tom Barney – bass guitar
- Lou Volpe – guitar
- Bob Cranshaw – bass guitar
- Warren Doze – drums
- Bob Christianson – synthesizer
- Thomas Bogoan – vocals
- Steve Clayton – vocals
- Leslie Dorsey – vocals
- Charles Magruder – vocals
- June Magruder – vocals
- Helene Miles – vocals
- Lenny Roberts – vocals
- David Smith – vocals
- Thomas Texter – vocals

== Charts ==
Chart performance for Running for My Life
Chart (1979)	Peak position
US Top LPs & Tape (Billboard)	142
US Top 101 to 200 Albums (Cash Box)	132
US The Album Chart (Record World)	173
