= Everybody Knows (Stills & Collins album) =

Studio album by Stills & Collins
- Released: September 22, 2017
- Recorded: 2017
- Genres: Americana; folk rock
- Length: 40:45
- Labels: Wildflower Records; Cleopatra Records

Stephen Stills chronology
Pierced Arrow (2016)	Everybody Knows (2017)	Live at Berkeley 1971 (2023)

Judy Collins chronology
Silver Skies Blue (2016)	Everybody Knows (2017)	Winter Stories (2019)

Everybody Knows is an album by Stephen Stills and Judy Collins, credited to "Stills & Collins". It marks the first collaboration between the longtime friends and former lovers. It was financed through a crowdfunding campaign on PledgeMusic.

== Background ==
From 1968 to 1969, Stills and Collins were romantically involved. He wrote several songs about Collins, most notably "Suite: Judy Blue Eyes" and "Judy". But despite Stills playing on several of Collins' recordings, they never recorded as a duo or performed on stage together. Stills said that he and Collins "talked over the years and muddled through conversations about if we did make a record together". Eventually they released Everybody Knows and went on tour.

== Release ==
Everybody Knows was released on September 22, 2017. It was No. 195 on the Billboard 200 chart, its initial position.

== Track listing ==
No.	Title	Writer(s)	Length
1.	"Handle with Care"	Bob Dylan, Jeff Lynne, Tom Petty, George Harrison, Roy Orbison	3:43
2.	"So Begins the Task"	Stephen Stills	3:35
3.	"River of Gold"	Judy Collins	3:36
4.	"Judy"	Stills	4:02
5.	"Everybody Knows"	Leonard Cohen, Sharon Robinson	5:26
6.	"Houses"	Collins	4:36
7.	"Reason to Believe"	Tim Hardin	2:57
8.	"Girl from the North Country"	Dylan	3:26
9.	"Who Knows Where the Time Goes"	Sandy Denny	5:40
10.	"Questions"	Stills	3:44
Total length:			40:45

== Personnel ==
Stills & Collins

- Stephen Stills — vocals, guitars
- Judy Collins — vocals, guitar

Additional musicians

- Tony Beard — drums
- Marvin Etzioni — mandolin, mandocello (on "Everybody Knows")
- Kevin McCormick — bass
- Russell Walden — piano, organ

Production

- Producers — Alan Silverman, Collins, Etzioni, Stills
- Executive producer — Katherine DePaul
- Engineer — Alex Williams
- Mixing — Silverman, Michael Colub, Mike Tierney, Paul Rolnick
- Mastering — Eleni Maltas

== Charts ==
Chart (2017)	Peak position
US Billboard 200	195
US Independent	13
US Album Sales Chart	46
US Americana/Folk Albums	9
US Top Rock Albums	45
Canadian RPM 100 Albums	
Dutch MegaCharts Albums	178
