= Who Knows Where the Time Goes (Judy Collins album) =

Studio album by Judy Collins
- Released: November 1968
- Recorded: 1968
- Studios: Elektra Sound Recorders, Los Angeles
- Genre: Folk rock
- Length: 43:17
- Label: Elektra
- Producer: David Anderle

Judy Collins chronology
Wildflowers (1967)	Who Knows Where the Time Goes (1968)	Whales & Nightingales (1970)

Singles from Who Knows Where the Time Goes
- 1. "Someday Soon" Released: January 1969

Professional ratings
Review scores
Source	Rating
AllMusic	4/5 stars
The Encyclopedia of Popular Music	4/5 stars
Rolling Stone	(positive)
The Rolling Stone Record Guide	5/5 stars
The Rolling Stone Album Guide	3/5 stars

Who Knows Where the Time Goes is the seventh studio album by American singer and songwriter Judy Collins, released by Elektra Records in 1968. It peaked at No. 29 on the Billboard 200 charts.

The album was recorded live in the studio and was Collins' first studio album to be recorded in Los Angeles. Produced by David Anderle, the album features numerous well-known musicians, including Stephen Stills (credited as "Steven Stills"). The songs include her own composition "My Father", Ian Tyson's "Someday Soon" (which would go on to become one of Collins' signature songs), two Leonard Cohen compositions ("Story of Isaac" and "Bird on the Wire"), the traditional murder ballad "Pretty Polly", and the title song, "Who Knows Where the Time Goes", composed by Sandy Denny.

Two versions of the song "Who Knows Where the Time Goes" were released. Version 1 with only vocal, two guitars, and bass appeared on the B-side of "Both Sides Now", on the soundtrack to the 1968 film The Subject Was Roses, and on the compilation album Colors of the Day. Version 2 is a composite: the first verse is the same take as version 1, but with everything remixed to the left channel, then crossfading to a different recording with a larger arrangement, modulated to a different key. Version 2 appears on the album.

Collins' cover of Joni Mitchell's "Chelsea Morning" was recorded during the Who Knows Where the Time Goes sessions, but not included on the album; however, a single release of the song, with "Pretty Polly" as the B-side, charted in August 1969.

"Hello, Hooray", written by Canadian singer-songwriter Rolf Kempf, was later covered as the opening track on Alice Cooper's 1973 album Billion Dollar Babies.

In 1969, the album was certified Gold by the RIAA for sales of over 500,000 copies in the US.

== Track listing ==
Side one

1. "Hello, Hooray" (Rolf Kempf) – 4:07
2. "Story of Isaac" (Leonard Cohen) – 3:30
3. "My Father" (Judy Collins) – 4:55
4. "Someday Soon" (Ian Tyson) – 3:43
5. "Who Knows Where the Time Goes" (Sandy Denny) – 4:20

Side two

1. "I Pity the Poor Immigrant" (Bob Dylan) – 4:04
2. "First Boy I Loved" (Robin Williamson) – 7:29
3. "Bird on the Wire" (Cohen) – 4:37
4. "Pretty Polly" (Traditional; arranged and adapted by Judy Collins and Michael Sahl) – 5:47

== Personnel ==
- Judy Collins – acoustic guitar (tracks 1, 4–9), electric piano (track 3), vocals

Additional musicians

- Michael Sahl – organ (tracks 1, 2, 6, 9), harpsichord (track 2), piano (tracks 5, 7, 8)
- Steven Stills – electric guitar (tracks 1, 3, 5, 7, 9), bass guitar (tracks 4, 6), acoustic guitar (track 5)
- James Burton – electric guitar (track 4, 6, 8, 9), dobro (track 6)
- Buddy Emmons – pedal steel guitar (tracks 4, 6, 8, 9)
- Chris Ethridge – bass guitar (tracks 1, 3, 5, 7–9)
- Michael Melvoin – piano (track 3)
- Van Dyke Parks – piano (track 4), electric piano (track 9)
- James Gordon – drums (tracks 1, 4–9), percussion (track 3)

Technical

- David Anderle – producer
- Jac Holzman – production supervisor
- John Haeny – engineer
- Len Steckler – cover photos
- Julie Snow – inside photo
- William S. Harvey – art direction, cover design

== Charts ==
=== Weekly charts ===
Chart performance for Who Knows Where the Time Goes
Chart (1969)	Peak position
Canada Top 50 Albums (RPM)	12
US Top LP's (Billboard)	29
US Top 100 Albums (Cash Box)	26
US Top 100 LP's (Record World)	14

=== Year-end charts ===
Year-end chart performance for Who Knows Where the Time Goes
Chart (1969)	Position
US Top LP's (Billboard)	53
US Top 100 Albums (Cash Box)	72

== Certifications and sales ==
Certifications for Who Knows Where the Time Goes
Region	Certification	Certified units/sales
United States (RIAA)	Gold	500,000^{^}
^{^} Shipments figures based on certification alone.
