= In My Life (Judy Collins album) =

Studio album by Judy Collins
- Released: November 1966
- Studio: Sound Techniques, London
- Genre: Baroque folk; folk rock
- Length: 43:29
- Label: Elektra
- Producer: Mark Abramson

Judy Collins chronology
Fifth Album (1965)	In My Life (1966)	Wildflowers (1967)

Professional ratings
Review scores
Source	Rating
AllMusic	4.5/5 stars
The Encyclopedia of Popular Music	4/5 stars
The Rolling Stone Album Guide	4/5 stars

In My Life is the fifth studio album by the American singer and songwriter Judy Collins, released by Elektra Records in 1966. It peaked at No. 46 on the Billboard Pop Albums charts in 1967.

Working with arranger Joshua Rifkin, many of the songs on the album feature orchestral arrangements, a departure from Collins' previous albums, which consist of more straightforward folk music. The album includes work by Leonard Cohen, the Beatles, Bob Dylan and Richard Fariña. Collins' version of the song "Suzanne" is considered to be the recording that introduced Cohen's music to a wide audience.

In a retrospective review for AllMusic, William Ruhlmann stated, "Judy Collins was already an accomplished interpretive singer before recording this album, but In My Life found her widening her horizons and revealing an even greater gift than one might have imagined; for the most part, it's a superb album and still one of her best."

In 1970, the album was certified Gold by the RIAA for sales of over 500,000 copies in the US.

== Track listing ==
Side one
No.	Title	Writer(s)	Length
1.	"Tom Thumb's Blues"	Bob Dylan	5:03
2.	"Hard Lovin' Loser"	Richard Fariña	2:37
3.	"Pirate Jenny"	Bertolt Brecht, Kurt Weill, Marc Blitzstein	4:02
4.	"Suzanne"	Leonard Cohen	4:21
5.	"La Colombe"	Jacques Brel, Alasdair Clayre	5:03

Side two
No.	Title	Writer(s)	Length
1.	"Marat/Sade"	Richard Peaslee	5:33
2.	"I Think It's Going to Rain Today"	Randy Newman	2:46
3.	"Sunny Goodge Street"	Donovan	2:55
4.	"Liverpool Lullaby"	Stan Kelly	2:57
5.	"Dress Rehearsal Rag"	Leonard Cohen	5:19
6.	"In My Life"	Lennon–McCartney	2:53

== Personnel ==
- Judy Collins – guitar, keyboards, vocals
- Louis Killen - concertina on “Liverpool Lullaby”

Technical

- Joshua Rifkin – arranger, conductor (tracks 1–3, 6–8, 10)
- Mark Abramson – producer
- Jac Holzman – production supervisor
- William S. Harvey – front cover photo, design
- Joel Brodsky – back cover photo

== Charts ==
Chart performance for In My Life
Chart (1965)	Peak position
US Top LP's (Billboard)	46
US Top 100 Albums (Cash Box)	50

== Certifications and sales ==
Certifications for In My Life
Region	Certification	Certified units/sales
United States (RIAA)	Gold	500,000^{^}
^{^} Shipments figures based on certification alone.
