= Spellbound (Judy Collins album) =

Studio album by Judy Collins
- Released: February 25, 2022
- Genre: Folk
- Length: 51:48
- Label: Cleopatra
- Producer: Judy Collins; Alan Silverman

Judy Collins chronology
White Bird: Anthology of Favorites (2021)	Spellbound (2022)

Spellbound is the twenty ninth studio album by the American folk singer-songwriter Judy Collins, released on February 25, 2022 by Cleopatra Records. The album is Collins's first to contain completely original material and largely features nostalgic themes in its lyrics. Spellbound received positive reviews from critics and earned Collins a nomination for the Grammy Award for Best Folk Album.

== Background and composition ==
Spellbound originated from a project Collins started in 2016 where she would write a poem every day for 90 days, later expanding it to a year. When she began recording Spellbound in 2019, she incorporated some of the poems into her lyrics. Collins also credited the COVID-19 Pandemic for giving her more time to work on the album. Although placed last on the tracklist, "Arizona" was the first song written for the album. Spellbound was recorded over the course of four recording sessions with live musicians and was produced by Collins and Alan Silverman. Some politically themed songs were cut from Spellbound to be released on a later album.

Critics noted that many of Spellbound's tracks feature reminiscent themes. "So Alive" details her time in Greenwich Village, while "City of Awakening" celebrates New York City as a whole. "Grand Canyon" and "When I Was A Girl In Colorado" both were inspired by Collins's childhood in Colorado. "Hell on Wheels" recollects a specific incident from her adolescence where she almost hit two children after drunk driving, and the children's father threatened to call the police on her. "Thomas Merton" was inspired by the 2018 biography The Martyrdom of Thomas Merton: An Investigation, which argues that Thomas Merton, a Trappist monk, was killed due to his anti-Vietnam war activism (contrary to the official cause of death as accidental electrocution). "Wild with Mist" was inspired by the paintings of J. M. W. Turner at the Tate Britain.

== Critical reception ==
Professional ratings
Aggregate scores
Source	Rating
Album of the Year	68/100
Metacritic	67/100
Review scores
Source	Rating
The Arts Desk	4/5 stars
Folk Alley	3/5 stars
The Guardian	3/5 stars
Mojo	3/5 stars
PopMatters	4/5 stars
Uncut	7/10

Upon release, Spellbound received positive acclaim from critics. According to the review aggregator Metacritic, Spellbound received "generally favorable reviews" based on a weighted average score of 67 out of 100 from four critic scores. Liz Thomson of The Arts Desk praised Collins's vocal abilities and noted that her classical training was reflected in the "through-composed songs that have a real sense of development". Henry Carrigan of Folk Alley wrote that "Collins dwells in [her] songs, imbuing them with emotional depth and the incandescent splendor of artistic genius. Listening to these songs, we’re spellbound, indeed". Dave Simpson wrote in The Guardian that "Some of the arrangements are too middle of the road, but [Collins's] piano runs are glorious [and] her voice [is] still as pure as mountain air". Colin Irwin in Mojo wrote that Spellbound is "unashamedly nostalgic, but her voice remains pure and true". In PopMatters, Justin Cober-Lake stated that given Collins's musical experience, "there’s nothing unexpected in the idea that she would release such a strong album right now. In another way, though, it’s just further evidence that magic always surprises". Jim Writh stated in Uncut that "The arrangements – аѕ ever – are more Les Misérables than Les Cousins, but her voice and her writing have lost none of their chandelier sparkle".

== Track listing ==
All tracks are written by Judy Collins.

Standard edition
No.	Title	Length
1.	"Spellbound"	3:37
2.	"Grand Canyon"	3:36
3.	"So Alive"	4:56
4.	"Hell on Wheels"	3:03
5.	"Shipwrecked Mariner"	3:59
6.	"When I Was a Girl in Colorado"	5:00
7.	"Thomas Merton"	4:47
8.	"Wild with Mist"	3:15
9.	"Gilded Rooms"	5:03
10.	"Prairie Dream"	5:09
11.	"City of Awakening"	3:26
12.	"Arizona"	5:57
Total length:		51:48

CD edition (bonus track)
No.	Title	Length
13.	"The Blizzard"

LP edition (bonus tracks)
No.	Title	Length
13.	"The Blizzard"
14.	"Slow Burn"
15.	"In the Twilight"
16.	"Mountain Girl"
