= Portrait of an American Girl =

Studio album by Judy Collins
- Released: March 29, 2005
- Genre: Vocal
- Label: Wildflower
- Producer: Judy Collins, Alan Silverman

Judy Collins chronology
Judy Collins Sings Leonard Cohen: Democracy (2004)	Portrait of an American Girl (2005)	Judy Collins Sings Lennon and McCartney (2007)

Professional ratings
Review scores
Source	Rating
Allmusic	link
The Encyclopedia of Popular Music	3/5 stars

Portrait of an American Girl is an album by Judy Collins, released in 2005.

== Track listing ==
1. "Singing Lessons" (Collins) - 4:05
2. "That Song About the Midway" (Joni Mitchell) - 4:09
3. "Can't Cry Hard Enough" (Marvin Etzioni, David Williams) - 3:18
4. "You Can't Buy Love" (Collins) - 3:13
5. "Pacing the Cage" (Bruce Cockburn) - 4:02
6. "Sally Go 'Round the Roses" (Abner Spector) - 3:27
7. "Voyager" (Collins) - 3:01
8. "Drops of Jupiter (Tell Me)" (Colin, Hotchkiss, Monihan, Stafford, Underwood) - 4:03
9. "Wedding Song (Song for Louis)" (Collins) - 3:51
10. "Checkmate" (Collins) - 6:07
11. "Liberté" (John Bettis, Steve Dorff) - 3:08
12. "Lincoln Portrait" (Aaron Copland) - 7:13
13. "How Can I Keep from Singing?" (Collins, Robert Lowry, Pete Seeger) - 3:53

== Personnel ==
- Judy Collins – vocals, guitar, piano, arranger, narrator
- Gary Anderson – synthesizer, arranger
- Tony Beard – drums
- Hugh McCracken – guitar
- Lee Musiker – piano
- Zev Katz – bass
- Russell Walden – piano, keyboards, arranger
- Johnson Flucker – arranger, conductor

== Production notes ==
- Produced by Judy Collins and Alan Silverman
- Engineered by Alan Silverman, Arnold Mischkulnig, Roy Hendrickson
- Mixed by Alan Silverman
- Cover photo by Annie Leibovitz
