= Joshua Rifkin =

American conductor, keyboard player, and musicologist

- Born: April 22, 1944 (age 82); New York City, New York, U.S.
- Education: Juilliard School (BS); New York University; University of Göttingen; Princeton University (MFA)
- Occupations: Pianist; professor
- Notable work: Scott Joplin: Piano Rags (1970)
- Musical career
- Genres: Ragtime (classical), Jazz
- Instrument: Piano
- Labels: Nonesuch Records; Decca Records; EMI Classics

Joshua Rifkin (born April 22, 1944) is an American conductor, pianist, and musicologist. He is currently a professor of music at Boston University. As a performer, he has recorded music by composers from Antoine Busnois to Silvestre Revueltas; as a scholar he has published research on composers from the Renaissance to the 20th century.

Rifkin is known among classical musicians for his theory that most of Bach's choral works were sung with only one singer per choral line. Rifkin argued that "so long as we define 'chorus' in the conventional modern sense, then Bach's chorus with few exceptions simply did not exist."

He is best known among the public for helping to revive ragtime in the 1970s by recording three albums of Scott Joplin's works for Nonesuch Records.

== Musical career ==
=== Joplin ===
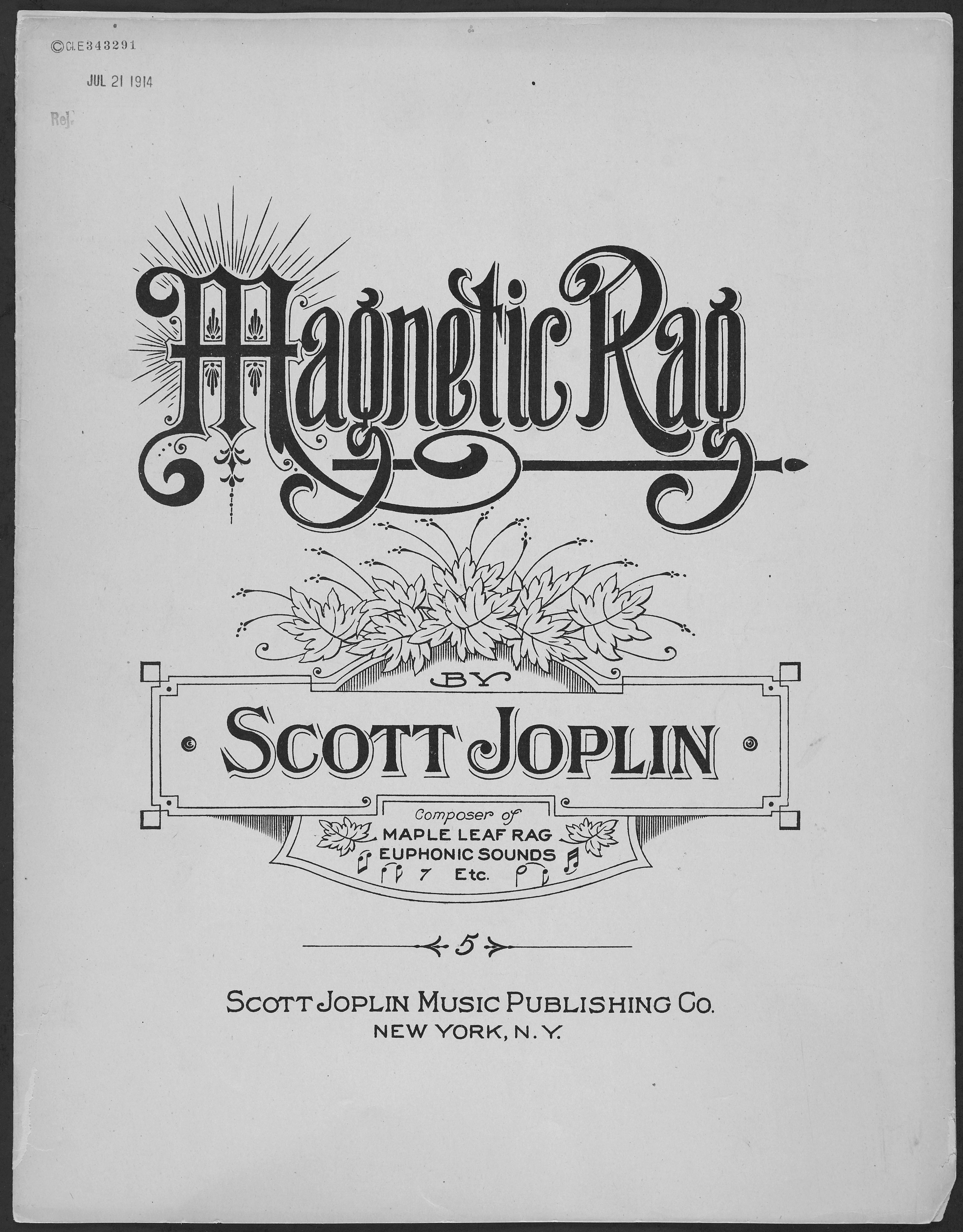
Cover of Scott Joplin's Magnetic Rag, published 1914

In November 1970, Rifkin released the first of three albums of Scott Joplin's work: Scott Joplin: Piano Rags. Released by Nonesuch, a classical music label, the album was critically acclaimed, commercially successful and led to other artists exploring the ragtime genre. It sold 100,000 copies in its first year and eventually became Nonesuch's first million-selling record. The Billboard "Best-Selling Classical LPs" chart for September 28, 1974 has the record at No. 5, with the follow-up "Volume 2" at No. 4, and a combined set of both volumes at No. 3. Separately both volumes had been on the chart for 64 weeks.

The album was nominated in 1971 for two Grammy Award categories: Best Album Notes and Best Instrumental Soloist Performance (without orchestra), but won neither. His work as a revivalist of Joplin's work immediately preceded the recording and subsequent performances of The Red Back Book, orchestrations of 15 rags, by Gunther Schuller and The New England Ragtime Ensemble (originally the New England Conservatory Ragtime Ensemble); and the adaptation of Joplin's music by Marvin Hamlisch for the 1973 film The Sting. In 1979, Alan Rich wrote in New York Magazine that Nonesuch Records "created, almost alone, the Scott Joplin revival."

In August 1990, Rifkin recorded a CD for the Decca label (catalog number 425 225) featuring rags by two of the other major composers of ragtime, Joseph Lamb and James Scott, and tango compositions by the Brazilian composer Ernesto Nazareth.

=== Bach ===
==== Bach's vocal scoring ====
Rifkin is best known to classical musicians for his thesis that much of Johann Sebastian Bach's vocal music, including the St Matthew Passion, was performed with only one singer per voice part, an idea generally rejected by his peers when he first proposed it in 1981. In the 21st century, the idea has become influential, although it has not achieved consensus in the field. The conductor Andrew Parrott wrote a book arguing for the position (The Essential Bach Choir; Boydell Press, 2000; as an appendix, the book includes the original paper that Rifkin began to present to the American Musicological Society in 1981, a presentation he was unable to complete because of a strong audience reaction). Bach scholars as Daniel Melamed, David Schulenberg, and John Butt have argued in its favor.

Other conductors and ensembles have followed Rifkin and Parrott in mounting performances that use some form of the vocal scoring argued for by Rifkin. Among them are: Butt with the Dunedin Consort (Magnificat, Cantata no. 63, Mass in B minor in Rifkin's critical edition of the work, discussed below, the St. John Passion, and St Matthew Passion), Konrad Junghänel (Mass in B minor, several cantatas, St. John Passion, and the motets), Sigiswald Kuijken (Mass in B minor, St. John Passion, St Matthew Passion, Christmas Oratorio, and the beginning of a cycle of the complete Bach cantatas), Paul McCreesh (St Matthew Passion, Magnificat, Easter Oratorio, and several cantatas), Monica Huggett (St. John Passion), Eric Milnes, who has begun recording the complete cantatas cycle with one singer per part, Marc Minkowski (Mass in B minor), Lars Ulrik Mortensen (Mass in B minor), Philippe Pierlot with the Ricercar Consort (Magnificat, masses and cantatas), Jeffrey Thomas (who has also often used multi-voice choirs), Jos van Veldhoven (Mass in B minor, St Matthew Passion), Matteo Messori (Christmas Oratorio, cantatas, motets), and Peter Kooy in the motets.

Rifkin himself has recorded Bach's Mass in B minor—his 1981 Nonesuch recording won the 1982–83 Gramophone Award in the Choral category—Magnificat, and cantatas nos. 8, 12, 51, 56, 78, 80, 82, 99, 106, 131, 140, 147, 158, 172, 182, 202, 209, 216, and others, for the Nonesuch, Mainach, L'Oiseau-lyre, and Dorian labels, all with his Bach Ensemble and various singers.

==== Other Bach scholarship ====
One of Rikfin's widely accepted findings, which he published in 1975, is that Bach's St Matthew Passion was first performed on Good Friday in 1727, not 1729 as was previously believed. Rifkin's scholarly critical edition of Bach's Mass in B minor was published by Breitkopf & Härtel in November 2006. It is the first edition to follow strictly Bach's final version from 1748 to 1750, not intermixing readings from the 1733 Missa (the first version of the Kyrie and Gloria), and posits novel solutions to removing edits made posthumously by Bach's son C.P.E. Bach.

Rifkin has done extensive research on the orchestral suites of Bach, notably arguing in detail that No. 2 in B minor, BWV 1067, is based on an earlier version in A minor in which the solo instrument was not the flute. Rifkin has created reconstructions of J.S. Bach's posited Oboe Concerti: for oboe, strings, and continuo in D minor, from BWV 35, 156, 1056 and 1059; in A major for oboe d'amore, strings, and continuo from BWV 1055; in E-flat major for oboe, strings, and continuo from BWV 49, 169 and 1053. All the original movements are keyboard settings. They reflect the Baroque oboe idiom convincingly. In that form, they evince the influence of the Venetian school, notably Marcello, Corelli, and Vivaldi.

In a paper published in the Bach-Jahrbuch in 2000, Rifkin argued that the cantata Nun ist das Heil und die Kraft, BWV 50 was not written by Bach, but by an as-yet-unidentified composer.

== Studies and career ==
Rifkin studied with Vincent Persichetti in the Music Division at the Juilliard School and received his Bachelor of Science degree in 1964. He also studied with Gustave Reese at New York University (1964–1966), at the University of Göttingen (1966–1967), and later with Arthur Mendel, Lewis Lockwood, Milton Babbitt, and Ernst Oster at Princeton University where he received his M.F.A. in 1969. Rifkin worked with Karlheinz Stockhausen at Darmstadt in 1961 and 1965.

Rifkin has taught at several universities, including Brandeis University (1970–1982), Harvard, and Yale, and is currently Professor of Music and Fellow of the University Professors at Boston University. He is noted for his research in the field of Renaissance and Baroque music: he has examined the authorship and chronology of music attributed to Josquin des Prez; Renaissance music manuscripts; the motet around 1500; and music of Heinrich Schütz. Rifkin has also published research about Anton Webern.

As a conductor and keyboard soloist, he has appeared with the English Chamber Orchestra, San Francisco Symphony, St. Louis Symphony, Scottish Chamber Orchestra, Victorian State Symphony, and Israel Camerata Jerusalem. He has led operatic productions at Theater Basel in Switzerland and the Bayerische Staatsoper, Munich. He has recorded music of Handel, Mozart, and Haydn with the Concertgebouw Chamber Orchestra and Capella Coloniensis. As a choral conductor he has recorded motets of Adrian Willaert with the Boston Camerata Chamber Singers, and music of the Medici Codex with the Dutch ensemble Capella Pratensis; that 2011 CD, titled Vivat Leo! Music for a Medici Pope, won a Diapason d'Or. Among his works as a composer are the two Winter pieces for violin resp. piano both written in 1961. The Winter piece for violin was premiered by Paul Zukofsky in 1962.

== Work in non-classical music ==
In the 1960s, Rifkin created arrangements for Judy Collins on her albums In My Life and Wildflowers. He performed with the Even Dozen Jug Band (along with David Grisman, Maria Muldaur, Stefan Grossman, and John Sebastian among others) and made a recording of his humorous re-imaginings of music by Lennon and McCartney in the style of the 18th century, notably Bach, known as The Baroque Beatles Book and recently reissued on CD. In a related vein, Rifkin sang the countertenor solo in the 1962 premiere performance of the spoof cantata "Iphigenia in Brooklyn" by P. D. Q. Bach (Peter Schickele).

== Bibliography ==
- Rifkin, Joshua (2002). Bach's Choral Ideal. Dortmunder Bach-Forschungen 5. Dortmund: Klangfarben Musikverlag. ISBN 978-3-932676-10-9.
- Rifkin, Joshua (November 1982). "Bach's Chorus: A Preliminary Report". The Musical Times. 123 (1677). Musical Times Publications Ltd.: 747–54. doi:10.2307/961592. JSTOR 961592.
- Rifkin, Joshua (July 1975). "The Chronology of Bach's Saint Matthew Passion". The Musical Quarterly. 61 (3): 360–87. doi:10.1093/mq/LXI.3.360.
- Rifkin, Joshua (2018). "Siegesjubel und Satzfehler. Zum Problem von "Nun ist das Heil und die Kraft" (BWV 50)". Bach-Jahrbuch. 86: 67–86. doi:10.13141/bjb.v20001697.

== Sources ==
- LA Times. "Entertainment Awards Database". Los Angeles Times.
- Billboard magazine (1974). "Best Selling Classical LPs". Billboard Magazine (September 28, 1974): 61.
- Rich, Alan (1979). "Music". New York (December 24, 1979). New York Media LLC: 81.
