= Song of Bernadette (song) =

1986 song performed by Jennifer Warnes

"Song of Bernadette" is a song written by Jennifer Warnes, Leonard Cohen and Bill Elliott, and first recorded on Jennifer Warnes' 1986 album Famous Blue Raincoat. The title refers to Bernadette Soubirous, a young French girl in the mid-19th century who claimed to have seen the Virgin Mary on several occasions. She was canonized by the Catholic Church and proclaimed a saint.

Warnes was inspired to write the song on a bus trip near Lourdes:

I was given the name Bernadette at birth. But my siblings preferred the name "Jennifer" so my name was changed one week later. In 1979, on tour in the south of France with Leonard Cohen, I began writing a series of letters between the "Bernadette" I almost was, and "Jennifer"–two energies within me. One innocent, and the other who had fallen for the world.... So the song arose in a bus nearby Lourdes. I was...thinking about the great Saint who held her ground so well, and was not swayed from what she knew to be true. But the song is also about me longing to return to a place that was more pure, honest and true. I still long for this, and I think others do too."

The song was recorded by Bette Midler as the first track on her 1998 studio album Bathhouse Betty.

Anne Murray included this song on her two CD set released in 1999 called "What a Wonderful World."

The song was performed as a duet by Aaron Neville and Linda Ronstadt on the former's album, The Grand Tour. The same performers sang it live on Neville's televised Christmas special.

The title is derived from the 1941 novel The Song of Bernadette, by Franz Werfel.
