= Both Sides, Now =

1966 song by Joni Mitchell

Song by Joni Mitchell

from the album Clouds
- Released: 1969
- Studio: A&M, Hollywood, California
- Genre: Folk rock
- Length: 4:32
- Label: Reprise
- Songwriter: Joni Mitchell
- Producers: Joni Mitchell, Paul A. Rothchild

Music videos
- "Both Sides, Now" on YouTube by Joni Mitchell from her 1969 album Clouds.
- "Both Sides, Now" on YouTube by Joni Mitchell from her 2000 album Both Sides Now.

"Both Sides, Now" is a song by Canadian singer-songwriter Joni Mitchell. One of the first recordings is by Judy Collins, whose version appeared on the US singles chart during the fall of 1968. The next year it was included on Mitchell's album Clouds, and became one of her best-known songs. In 1991 Mitchell re-recorded the song with an orchestral arrangement on her 2000 album Both Sides Now.

In 2004, Rolling Stone ranked "Both Sides, Now" at number 170 on its list of the 500 Greatest Songs.

== Background ==
Mitchell has said that "Both Sides, Now" was inspired by a passage in Henderson the Rain King, a 1959 novel by Saul Bellow.

I was reading ... Henderson the Rain King on a plane and early in the book Henderson ... is also up in a plane. He's on his way to Africa and he looks down and sees these clouds. I put down the book, looked out the window and saw clouds too, and I immediately started writing the song. I had no idea that the song would become as popular as it did.

"Both Sides, Now" is written in an open tuning of D-A-D-F#-A-D. In early live recordings, Mitchell played the song in G, with a capo on the fifth fret. The 1969 studio version on Clouds is down one half-step, in F# major, with the capo on the 4th fret. The 2000 orchestral version is in D, which gives a sense of how Mitchell would sing the song in true open D tuning. The song uses a modified I–IV–V chord progression.

== 2000 re-recording ==
Mitchell re-recorded the song in a lush, orchestrated fashion for her 2000 album Both Sides Now. The recording won arranger Vince Mendoza a Grammy Award for Best Instrumental Arrangement Accompanying Vocalist(s).

In April 2000, two months after the album's release, Mitchell sang the song with a 70-piece orchestra at the end of an all-star celebration for her at the Hammerstein Ballroom in New York City.

The 2000 version is played during an emotional scene featuring Emma Thompson in the 2003 film Love Actually. It was featured in the 2001 film Life as a House. It was also played during the 2010 Winter Olympics opening ceremony.

=== Certifications ===
Region	Certification	Certified units/sales
Canada (Music Canada)	Platinum	80,000^{‡}
United Kingdom (BPI)	Gold	400,000^{‡}
^{‡} Sales+streaming figures based on certification alone.

== Legacy ==
The song inspired the title of Hillary Clinton's 2024 memoir, Something Lost, Something Gained.

Joni Mitchell performed the song on January 30, 2025 at Kia Forum in Inglewood, California for FireAid to help with relief efforts for the January 2025 Southern California wildfires. In June 2026, CBS News included the song in its list of the 250 essential American songs of the past 250 years.

== Judy Collins version ==
"Both Sides Now"

Single by Judy Collins

from the album Wildflowers
- B-side: "Who Knows Where the Time Goes?" (US) "Hey, That's No Way to Say Goodbye" (UK)
- Released: October 1968
- Genre: Folk rock
- Length: 3:14
- Label: Elektra
- Songwriter: Joni Mitchell
- Producer: Mark Abramson

Judy Collins singles chronology
"Hard Lovin' Loser" (1967)	"Both Sides Now" (1968)	"Someday Soon" (1969)

Audio sample
- file; help

Music videos
- Both Sides Now on YouTube, by Judy Collins from her 1967 Elektra album Wildflowers (3:11 minutes, with lyrics).

Shortly after Mitchell wrote the song, Judy Collins recorded the first commercially released version for her 1967 album Wildflowers. In October 1968 the same version was released as a single, reaching number 8 on the U.S pop singles charts by December. It reached number 6 in Canada. In early 1969 it won a Grammy Award for Best Folk Performance. The record peaked at number 3 on Billboard's Easy Listening survey and "Both Sides Now" has become one of Collins' signature songs. Mitchell disliked Collins' recording of the song, despite the publicity that its success generated for Mitchell's own career. The Collins version is featured as the opening title music of the 2014 romantic comedy And So It Goes, and as the end title music of the 2018 supernatural horror film Hereditary. It also features in the first teaser trailer for Toy Story 4.

=== Chart history ===
==== Weekly charts ====
Chart (1968–1970)	Peak position
Australia Kent Music Report	37
Canada RPM Top Singles	6
New Zealand	7
UK singles	14
US Billboard Hot 100	8
US Billboard Easy Listening	3
US Cash Box Top 100	8

==== Year-end charts ====
Chart (1968)	Rank
Canada	96

== Other recordings ==
- Neil Diamond recorded and included a version in his 1969 album, Touching You, Touching Me. The album reached #30 on the Billboard album chart and was certified gold.
- Willie Nelson recorded a version and made it the title track of his March 1970 album Both Sides Now.
- For the film CODA, Emilia Jones sang a version for the soundtrack, and performed the song live at the 2022 British Academy of Film and Television Arts Awards Ceremony.
