= William S. Harvey =

American graphic designer and art director

- Born: William Stanley Harvey; November 10, 1920; New York City, U.S.
- Died: July 15, 1993 (aged 72); Los Angeles, California, U.S.
- Occupations: Graphic designer, art director
- Years active: 1940s – 1970s
- Known for: Elektra Records; Nonesuch Records

William Stanley Harvey (November 10, 1920 – July 15, 1993) was an American graphic designer and art director, responsible for the design of Elektra Records' logos and many of its album covers between the 1950s and 1970s including those by Love, The Doors, MC5, The Stooges, Judy Collins, Tim Buckley and others.

== Biography ==
Born in New York City, Harvey was in the US Army in World War II, and later worked as a designer and photographer in the advertising industry on Madison Avenue. In 1953, Jac Holzman, who had recently set up the Elektra label, asked him to design an LP sleeve for a release by the folk singer Hally Wood, which Harvey described as "the most god-awful music I ever heard". The lettering used by Harvey for the word "Elektra" became part of the label's logo for the next decade, together with his later sketch of a guitar player. At a time when LP design was in its infancy, Holzman continued to use Harvey's line drawings and designs on many subsequent album covers. Richie Unterberger said: "A large part of [Elektra's] reputation was due to the quality of its presentation, of which the design, photography, and lettering on the LP sleeves were crucial."

In 1958, Holzman appointed Harvey as Elektra's full-time art director. Holzman said: "Bill Harvey knew how to present an artist. For Elektra, compelling covers were essential to capture the eye of the browser and convey the drama of the music to people forced to buy on faith, because we had very little radio support, and retailers no longer provided listening booths. Elektra graphics.. were a key part of our identity". Cary Ginell wrote: "Bill Harvey created the label’s visual identity, using stark line drawings, high quality photography, whimsical ideas, abstract art, and even sex to help sell the albums. Whether the music was folk, blues, ethnic, or psychedelic, Holzman and Harvey blazed a trail that would lead to the Beatles' Sgt. Pepper and the revolutionizing of album art." Harvey was also responsible for cover design on Elektra's subsidiary Nonesuch label.

In the 1960s, Harvey designed the distinctive logo for the band Love, "four cartoonish letters with exaggerated, curvaceous serifs", incorporating male and female symbols. He also designed the logos for other bands, including the Doors and Bread, and the butterfly logo that replaced the label's earlier guitar player symbol in the late 1960s. He was responsible for striking images on LP covers, such as those for the Doors' album Strange Days, and Tim Buckley's Goodbye and Hello, often working with photographer Joel Brodsky. Harvey was uncompromising in his standards. When Holzman was considering whether to sign Joni Mitchell, Harvey reportedly refused her permission to design her own album covers, resulting in Mitchell signing with the rival Reprise label instead.

Harvey was nominated four times for Grammy Awards for best cover design, between 1964 and 1968.

After Holzman sold Elektra to Warner Communications in 1972, Harvey was fired by the new company boss, David Geffen. Harvey set up a new design company, Harvey House. He died in 1992 or 1993.

== Legacy ==
In 1986, British indie band Felt released an instrumental tribute to Harvey, "Song for William S. Harvey" on the album The Seventeenth Century.
