= Judy Collins =

American singer-songwriter and musician (born 1939)

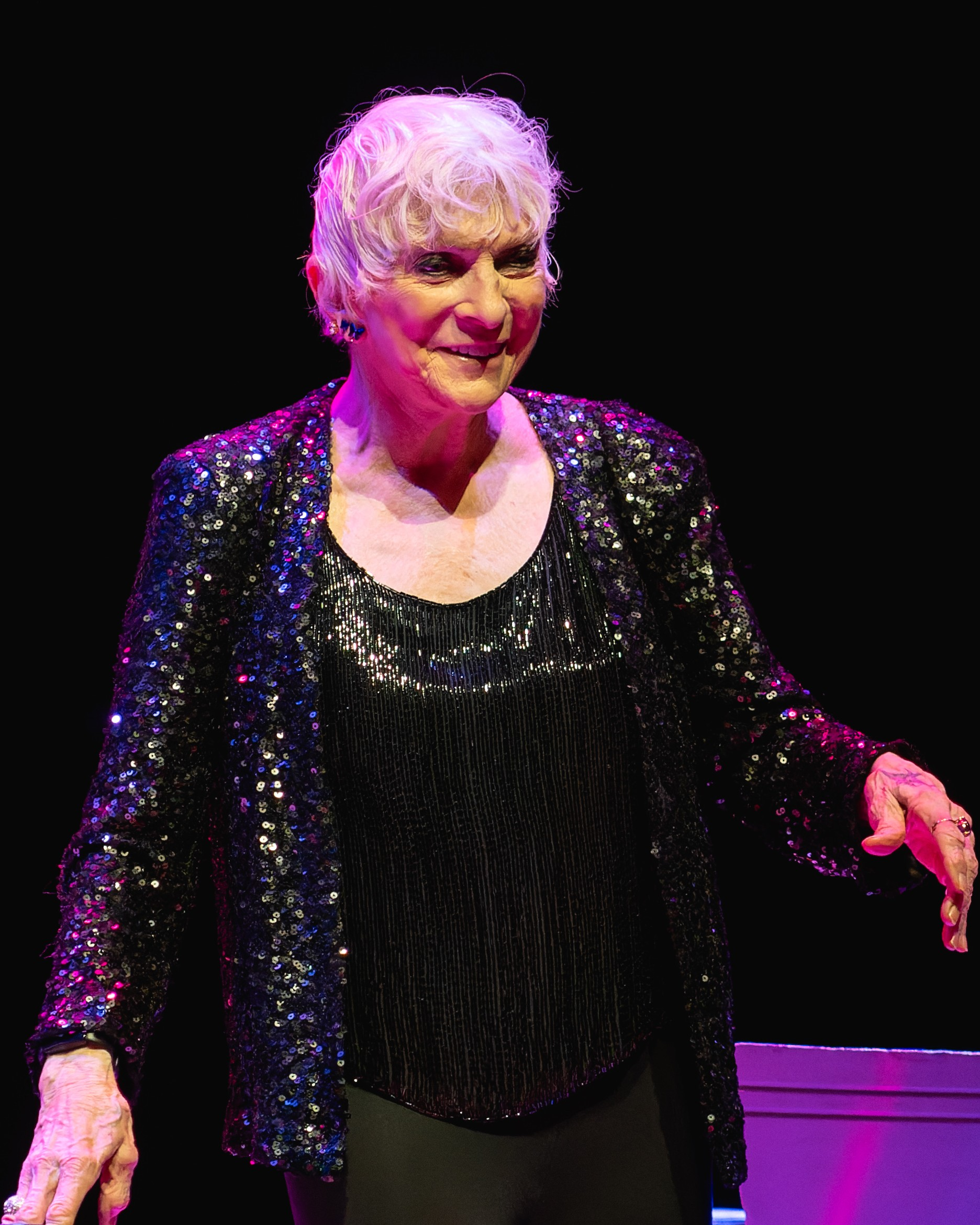
- Collins in 2023

Background information
- Born: Judith Marjorie Collins; May 1, 1939 (age 87); Seattle, Washington, U.S.
- Origin: Denver, Colorado, U.S.
- Genres: Folk; Americana; country; rock and roll; pop
- Occupations: Singer; songwriter; musician
- Instruments: Vocals; piano; guitar; autoharp
- Works: Discography
- Years active: 1959–present
- Labels: Elektra; Geffen; MCA; Mesa Bluemoon; Rhino; Atlantic; Wildflower; Cleopatra
- Spouses: Peter Taylor (m. 1958; div. 1965); Louis Nelson (m. 1996; died 2024)
- Website: judycollins.com

Judith Marjorie Collins (born May 1, 1939) is an American singer-songwriter and musician with a career spanning nearly seven decades. An Academy Award-nominated documentary director and a Grammy Award-winning recording artist, she is known for her eclectic tastes in the material she records (which has included folk music, country, show tunes, pop music, rock and roll and standards), for her social activism, and for the clarity of her voice. Her discography consists of 36 studio albums, nine live albums, numerous compilation albums, four holiday albums, and 21 singles.

Collins' debut studio album, A Maid of Constant Sorrow, was released in 1961 and consisted of traditional folk songs. She had her first charting single with "Hard Lovin' Loser" (No. 97) from her fifth studio album In My Life (1966), but it was the lead single from her sixth studio album Wildflowers (1967), "Both Sides, Now" – written by Joni Mitchell – that gave her international prominence. The single reached No. 8 on the Billboard Pop Singles chart and won Collins her first Grammy Award for Best Folk Performance. She enjoyed further success with her recordings of "Someday Soon", "Chelsea Morning" (also written by Mitchell), "Amazing Grace", "Turn! Turn! Turn!", and "Cook with Honey".

Collins experienced the biggest success of her career with her recording of Stephen Sondheim's "Send in the Clowns" from her tenth studio album Judith (1975). The single peaked at No. 36 on the Billboard Pop Singles chart in 1975 and then again in 1977 at No. 19, spending 27 non-consecutive weeks on the chart and earning her a Grammy Award nomination for Best Pop Vocal Performance, Female, as well as a Grammy Award for Sondheim for Song of the Year. Judith also became her best-selling studio album; it was certified Gold by the RIAA in 1975 for sales of over 500,000 copies and Platinum in 1996 for sales of over 1,000,000 copies.

In 2017, Collins' rendition of the song "Amazing Grace" was selected for preservation in the National Recording Registry by the Library of Congress as being "culturally, historically, or aesthetically significant". That same year, she received a Grammy Award nomination for Best Folk Album for Silver Skies Blue with Ari Hest. In 2019 at the age of 80, she scored her first No. 1 album on an American Billboard chart with Winter Stories, a duet album with Norwegian singer, songwriter, and guitarist Jonas Fjeld featuring Chatham County Line. In 2022, she released her first studio album of all original material, titled Spellbound, and it earned her another Grammy nomination for Best Folk Album.

== Early life ==
Collins was born on May 1, 1939, the eldest of five siblings, in Seattle where she lived for the first ten years of her life. Her father, Charles "Chuck" Collins (a blind singer, pianist, and radio show host) took a job in Denver in 1949 and the family moved there. Her grandfather on her father's side was Irish.

Judy Collins contracted polio at the age of 11 and spent two months in isolation in a hospital. She grew up listening to the traditional Irish music her father sang. She did not know what folk music was when she was young. She said, "I just thought it was probably Rodgers and Hart. Those were the songs he [her father] sang on the radio. I didn't understand until I discovered "The Gypsy Rover" and "Barbara Allen" when I was 15. I didn't realize I had been singing "Danny Boy" all of that time... "Danny Boy" was a folk song."

== Career ==
=== Beginnings ===
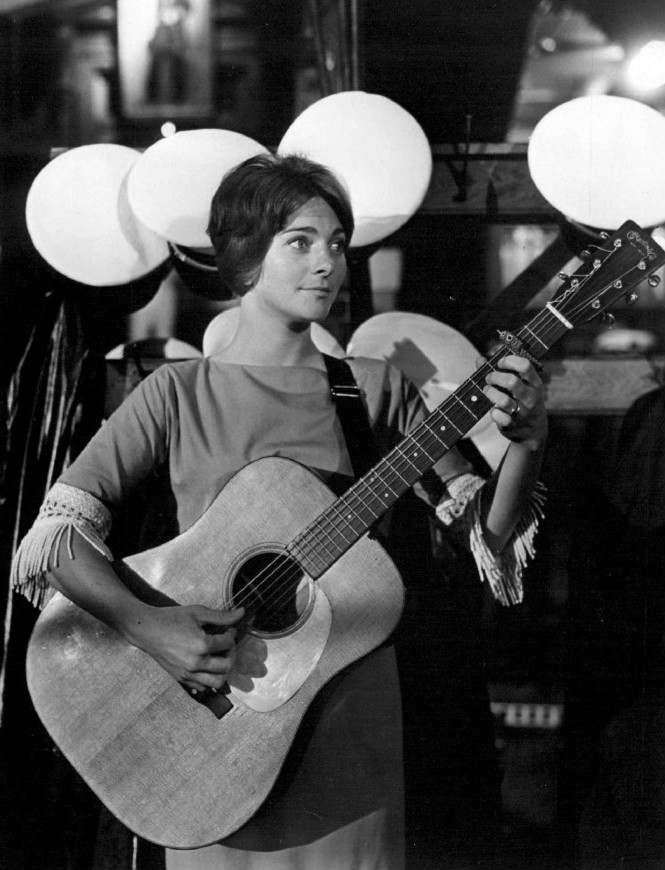
Collins during a 1963 appearance on Hootenanny

Collins studied classical piano with Antonia Brico, making her public debut at age 13 performing Mozart's Concerto for Two Pianos. She also played Chopin, Debussy, and Rachmaninoff as a child. Brico took a dim view of her developing interest in folk music, which led her to the difficult decision to discontinue her piano lessons. Years later, after she became known internationally, she invited Brico to one of her concerts in Denver. When they met after the performance, Brico took both of Collins' hands into hers, looked wistfully at her fingers and said, "Little Judy—you really could have gone places." Still later, she discovered that Brico herself had made a living when she was younger playing jazz and ragtime piano (Singing Lessons, pp. 71–72).

In her early life, Collins met many professional musicians through her father.

It was the music of Woody Guthrie and Pete Seeger and the traditional songs of the folk revival of the early 1960s, however, that kindled Collins' interest and awoke in her a love for lyrics. Three years after her debut as a piano prodigy, she was playing guitar. Her first public appearances as a folk artist after her graduation from Denver's East High School were at Michael's Pub in Boulder, Colorado and the folk club Exodus in Denver. Her music became popular at the University of Connecticut, where her husband taught. She performed at parties and for the campus radio station along with David Grisman and Tom Azarian.

=== 1960s ===
Collins eventually made her way to Greenwich Village, New York City where she played in clubs like Gerde's Folk City until she signed with Elektra Records, a label she was associated with for 35 years. In 1961, she released her debut studio album, A Maid of Constant Sorrow, at age 22.

At first, Collins sang traditional folk songs or songs written by others–in particular the protest songwriters of the time, such as Tom Paxton, Phil Ochs, and Bob Dylan. She recorded her own versions of important songs from the period, such as Dylan's "Mr. Tambourine Man" and Pete Seeger's "Turn! Turn! Turn!". She was also instrumental in bringing little-known musicians to a wider public. For example, she recorded songs by Canadian poet Leonard Cohen, who became a close friend over the years. She also recorded songs by singer-songwriters such as Eric Andersen, Fred Neil, Ian Tyson, Joni Mitchell, Randy Newman, Robin Williamson, and Richard Fariña long before they gained national acclaim.

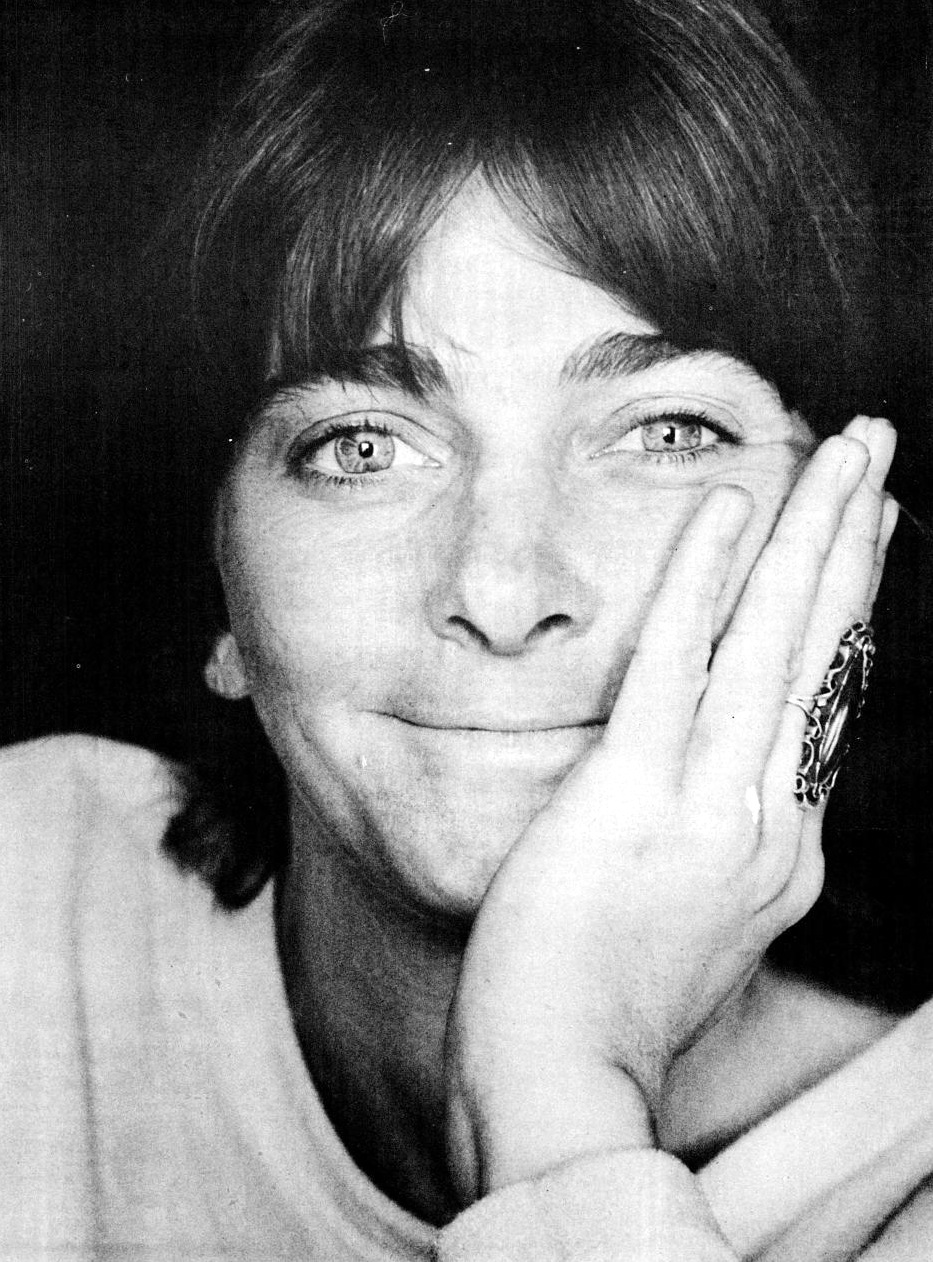
Judy Collins in 1965

Collins' first few studio albums consisted of straightforward guitar-based folk songs, but with her fifth studio album In My Life (1966), she began branching out to include works from such diverse sources as the Beatles, Leonard Cohen, Jacques Brel, and Kurt Weill. Mark Abramson produced and Joshua Rifkin arranged the album, adding lush orchestration to many of the numbers. The album was a major departure for a folk artist and set the course for Collins' subsequent work over the next decade.

With her sixth studio album Wildflowers (1967), also produced by Abramson and arranged by Rifkin, Collins began to record her own compositions, beginning with "Since You Asked". The album also provided her with a major hit and a Grammy Award in Mitchell's "Both Sides, Now", which in December 1968 reached No. 8 on the Billboard Hot 100, later (February 1970) reaching No. 14 on the UK Singles Chart.

Collins' seventh studio album Who Knows Where the Time Goes (1968) was produced by David Anderle, and featured back-up guitar by Stephen Stills (of Crosby, Stills & Nash), with whom she was romantically involved at the time. (She was the inspiration for Stills's CSN classic "Suite: Judy Blue Eyes".) Time Goes had a mellow country sound and included Ian Tyson's "Someday Soon" and the title track, written by the UK singer-songwriter Sandy Denny. The album also featured Collins' composition "My Father" and one of the first covers of Leonard Cohen's "Bird on the Wire".

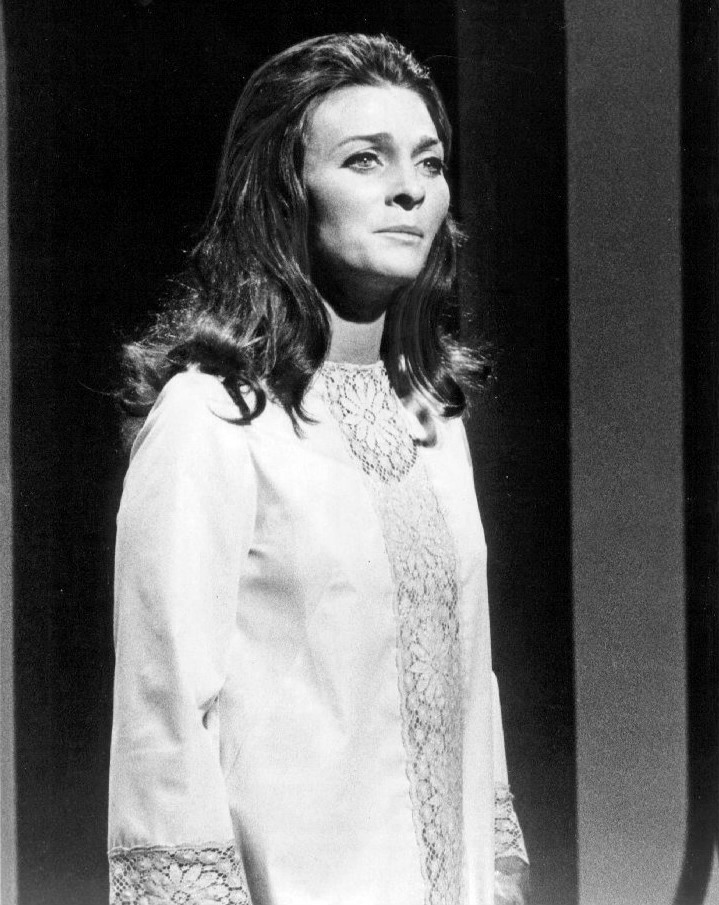
Collins performing on The Smothers Brothers Comedy Hour, 1968

Two of Collins' songs ("Who Knows Where the Time Goes?" composed by Sandy Denny and "Albatross") were featured in the 1968 film The Subject Was Roses.

=== 1970s ===
By the 1970s, Collins had a solid reputation as an art song singer and folk singer and had begun to stand out for her own compositions. She also performed a broad range of material: her songs from this period included the traditional Christian hymn "Amazing Grace", the Stephen Sondheim Broadway ballad "Send in the Clowns" (both of which were top 20 hits as singles in both the U.S. and the U.K.), a recording of Joan Baez's "A Song for David", and her own compositions, such as "Born to the Breed".

In 1971, Collins released her second live album, Living and the compilation album Colors of the Day: The Best of Judy Collins followed a year later. Collins' contemplative ninth studio album True Stories and Other Dreams (1973) featured an original song about a friend who took his own life ("Song for Martin") and another about the life of Argentine Marxist revolutionary Che Guevara ("Che"). For her tenth studio album Judith (1975), Collins collaborated with producer Arif Mardin and produced her biggest hit single with her reflective version of Stephen Sondheim's "Send in the Clowns". It became her best-selling record, eventually going platinum.

As Collins stepped up to a higher level of stardom, the longtime activist put political themes at the forefront of her eleventh studio album Bread and Roses (1976). Political statements like the title song, originally a poem by James Oppenheim commonly associated with a 1912 garment workers strike in Lawrence, Massachusetts, were balanced with such pop compositions as Elton John's "Come Down in Time", but the album failed to achieve the commercial success of Judith. Following the release of the album, Collins underwent treatment for damaged vocal cords, and after years of struggling with alcoholism, she sought medical help to give up drinking. Her compilation album So Early in the Spring... The First 15 Years (1977) sold modestly.

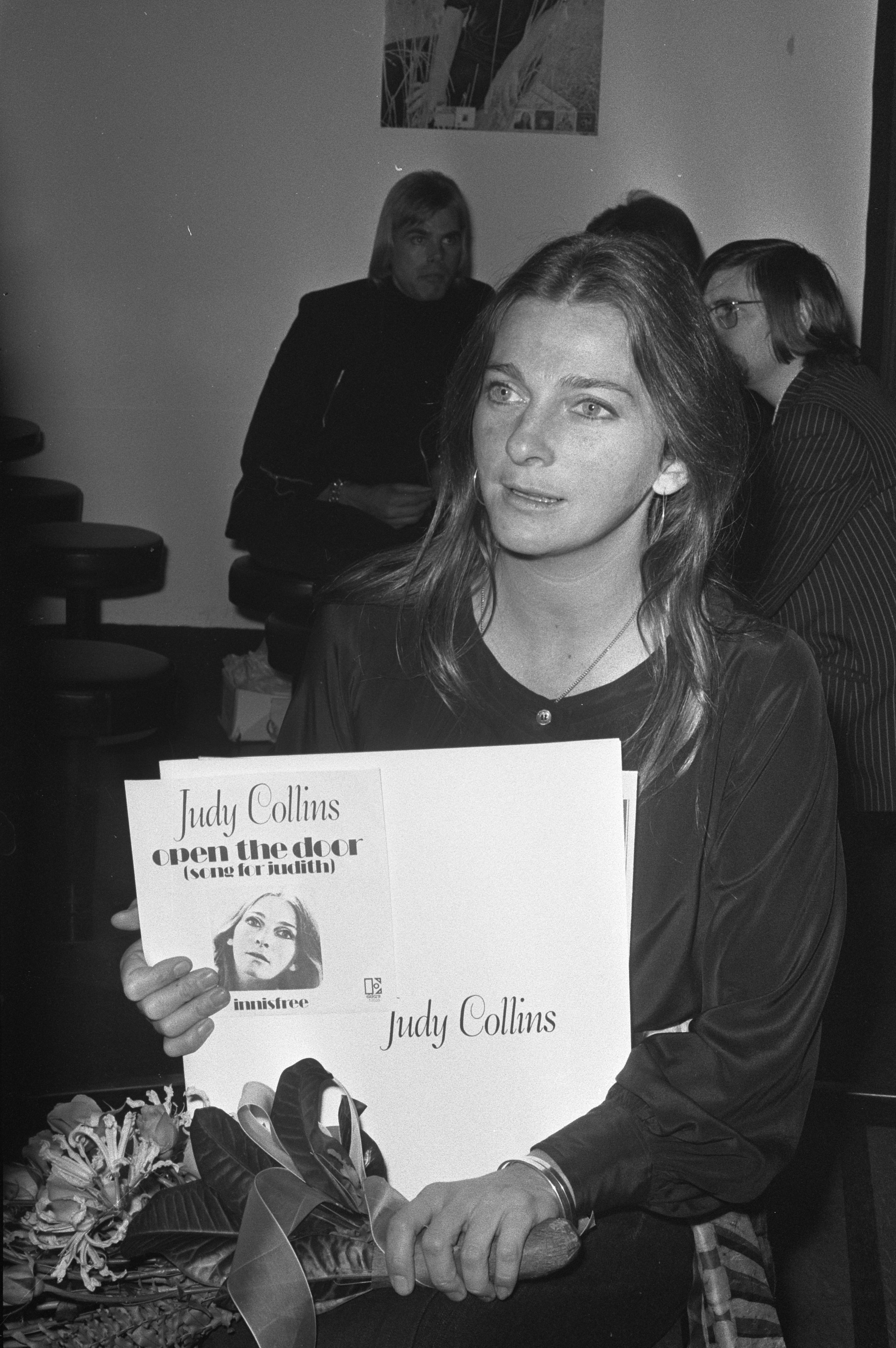
Collins in Hilton Amsterdam, a hotel, in 1971

Collins guest starred on The Muppet Show in an episode broadcast in January 1978, singing "Leather-Winged Bat", "There Was an Old Lady Who Swallowed a Fly", "Do-Re-Mi", and "Send in the Clowns". She also appeared several times on Sesame Street, where she performed "Fishermen's Song" with a chorus of Anything Muppet fishermen, sang a trio with Biff and Sully using the word "yes", and starred in a modern musical fairy tale skit called "The Sad Princess". In 1979, Collins released her twelfth studio album Hard Times for Lovers, a pop-oriented album in the same vein as Judith; she gained some extra publicity with the cover sleeve photograph of her in the nude.

=== 1980s ===
Running for My Life (1980) and Times of Our Lives (1982) were well-crafted exercises in adult pop and soft rock, but as tastes changed, Collins' sales were on the decline. Home Again (1984) found her exploring some new musical avenues, including a synth-based cover of Yaz's "Only You" and a duet with country star T. G. Sheppard on the title cut. While the "Home Again" single was a minor hit, the album was not, and after 23 years, Collins and Elektra parted ways. She performed the music for the 1983 animated television special The Magic of Herself the Elf, as well as the theme song of the Rankin/Bass Productions television film The Wind in the Willows.

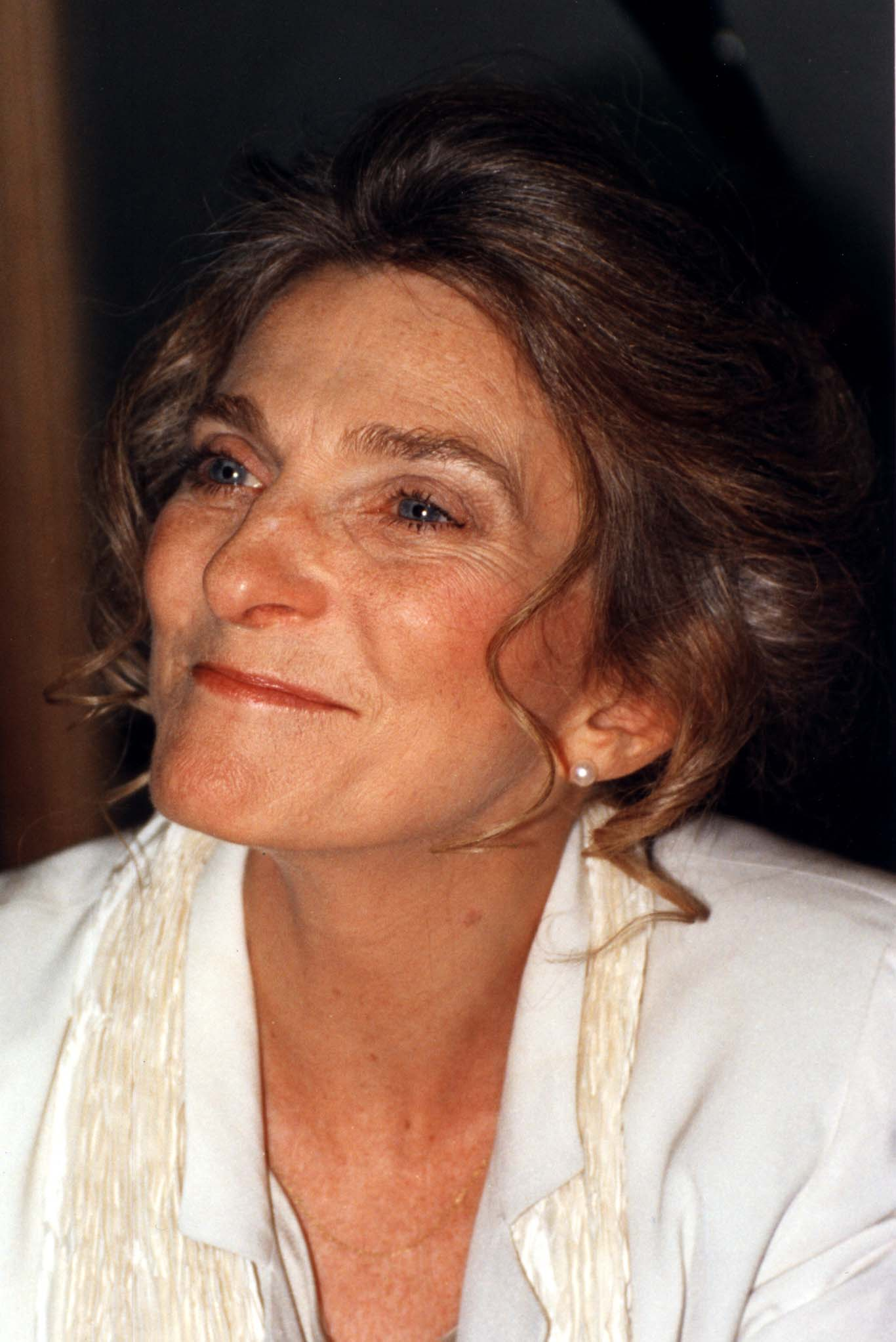
Collins at a book signing, 1995

Collins traveled to England in 1985 and struck a one-off deal with Telstar Records to record the studio album Amazing Grace, in which she re-recorded several of her better-known songs with an inspirational bent. In 1987, she signed with the independent Gold Castle label, and her first studio album for them, Trust Your Heart, which collected seven tracks from Amazing Grace and added three new selections. That same year, she released her first memoir, Trust Your Heart.

In 1989, Collins released two albums: a live disc titled Sanity and Grace, and a collaboration with clarinetist Richard Stoltzman, Innervoices.

=== 1990s ===
In 1990, Collins released her eighteenth studio album Fires of Eden on Columbia Records. The album spawned one single – "Fires of Eden", written by Kit Hain and Mark Goldenberg. The single peaked at No. 31 on Billboard's Adult Contemporary chart. At the time of its release, Collins performed it live on several occasions, including on The Tonight Show Starring Johnny Carson and The Joan Rivers Show. A music video promoting it and featuring her was also released. Later, Cher recorded "Fires of Eden" for her 1991 studio album Love Hurts. Other songs from Fires of Eden include "The Blizzard", "Home Before Dark", and a cover of the Hollies song – "The Air That I Breathe". That same year saw the release of a pair of children's albums, Baby's Morningtime and Baby's Bedtime. Collins performed at President Bill Clinton's first inauguration in 1993, singing "Amazing Grace" and "Chelsea Morning". (The Clintons have stated that they named their daughter, Chelsea, after her recording of the song.)

For her next studio album, Collins turned to a project that was both personal and familiar, a set of Bob Dylan covers titled Judy Sings Dylan... Just Like a Woman. Released in 1993, the album was a commercial success and reminded fans she was still active and in fine voice. In 1994, she issued her first Christmas album, Come Rejoice! A Judy Collins Christmas. It would prove to be the first in a series, with other holiday releases soon following, the first being the live album Christmas at the Biltmore Estate in 1997, followed by All on a Wintry Night in 2000. Collins combined her interests in music and literature for her next project. In 1995, she published a novel, Shameless, that took place against the backdrop of the music business; she also released an album of the same name that served as the soundtrack.

In 1998, Collins published her third book, Singing Lessons: A Memoir of Love, Loss, Hope and Healing, which focused on her struggles with alcoholism, depression, and the emotional trauma of her son's death. In 1999, she released Classic Broadway, a collection of vintage show tunes. That same year, she and her manager Katherine DePaul founded Wildflower Records.

=== 2000s–2020s ===
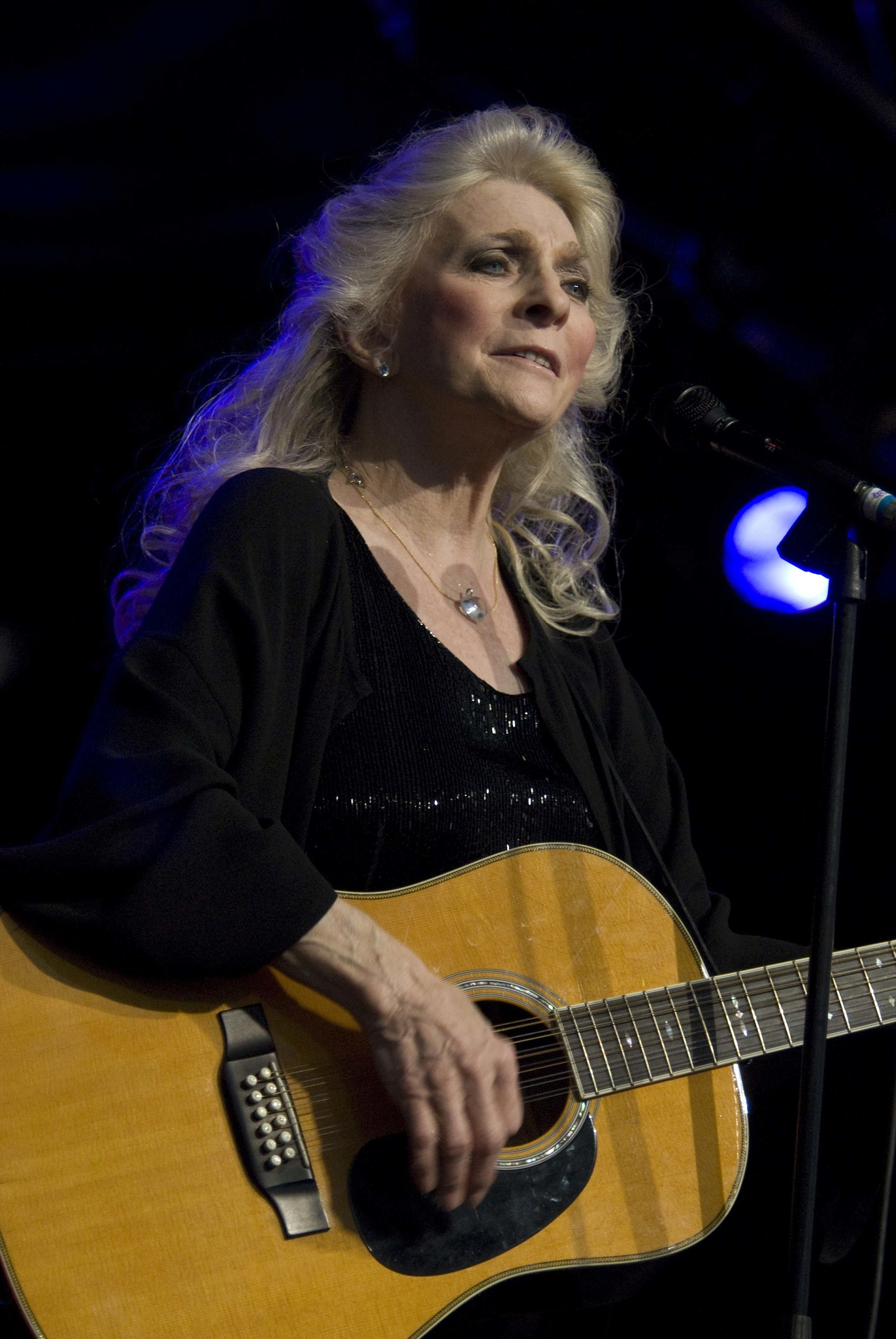
Collins performing at the Cambridge Folk Festival, 2008

Collins maintained a busy release schedule via Wildflower, issuing numerous live albums and reissues as well as new material such as 2005's Portrait of an American Girl, 2010's Paradise, and 2011's Bohemian, all of which focused on her continued strength as an interpretive vocalist. In 2006, she sang "This Little Light of Mine" in a commercial for Eliot Spitzer. In 2007, she released her own covers collection of Beatles songs, entitled Judy Collins Sings Lennon and McCartney. Various artists, including Shawn Colvin, Rufus Wainwright, and Chrissie Hynde, covered Collins's compositions for the tribute album Born to the Breed in 2008. In the same year, she received an honorary doctorate from Pratt Institute. The tribute albums Tom Thumb's Blues: A Tribute to Judy Collins and Born to the Breed: A Tribute to Judy Collins appeared in 2000 and 2008, respectively.

In 2010, Collins sang "The Weight of the World" at the Newport Folk Festival, a song by Amy Speace. Another memoir from Collins, Sweet Judy Blue Eyes: My Life in Music, appeared the following year and put its focus on her career as an artist. In July 2012, she appeared as a guest artist on the Australian SBS television programme RocKwiz. She paid homage to some of her favorite songwriters as well as her favorite vocalists with the 2015 album Strangers Again, which featured duets with Willie Nelson, Jackson Browne, Jeff Bridges, and Glen Hansard. The album also included a track with singer-songwriter Ari Hest. Collins and Hest joined forces again in 2016 for a full studio album titled Silver Skies Blue, which later earned them a Grammy Award nomination for Best Folk Album.

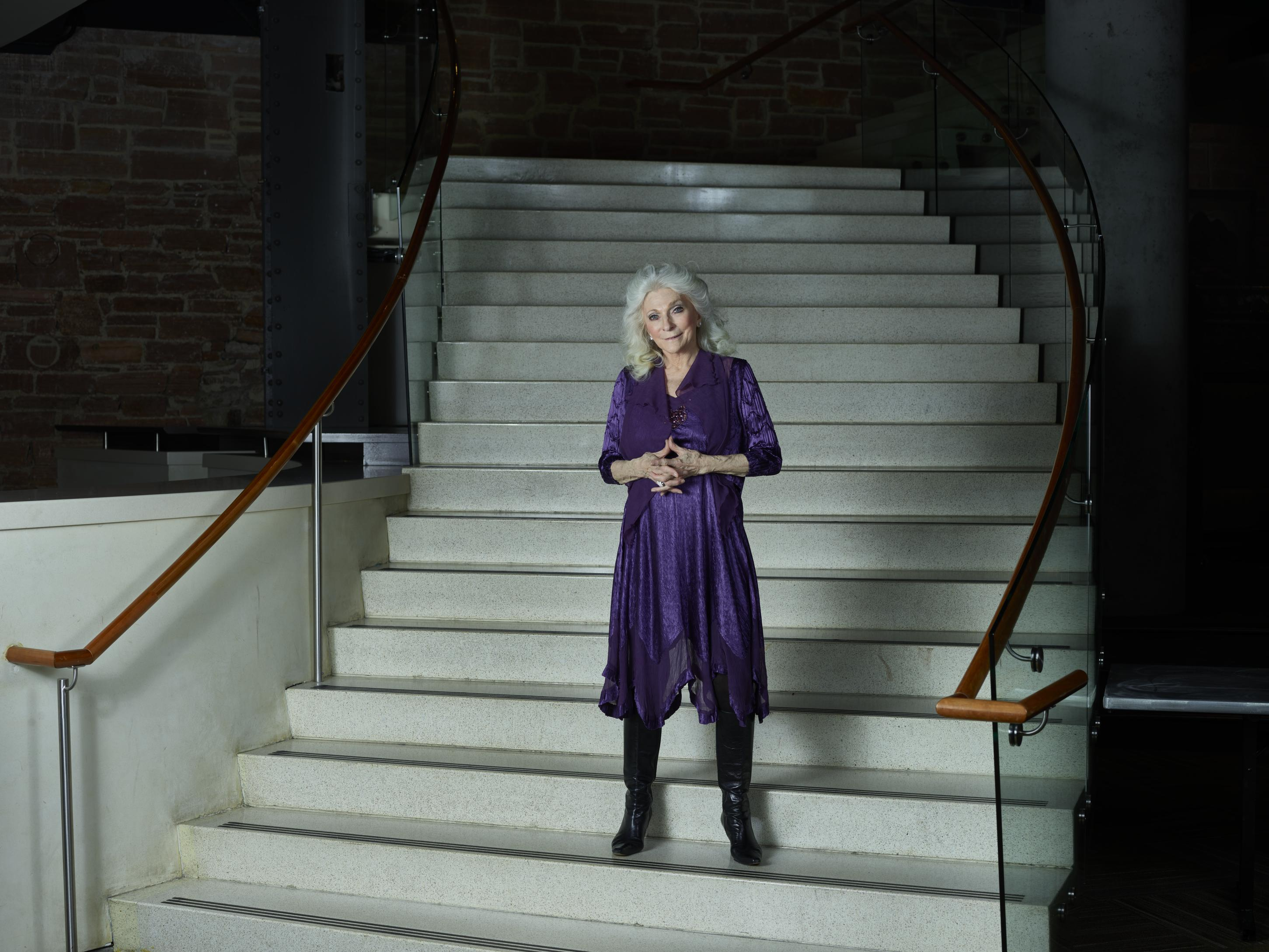
Judy Collins, prior to a performance at the Boettcher Concert Hall, part of the Denver Performing Arts Complex, in 2016

In 2017, Collins returned to the work of the songwriter who gave her "Send in the Clowns" with A Love Letter to Stephen Sondheim, and the same year, she and her longtime friend, Stephen Stills, collaborated on an album, Everybody Knows. In addition to the two albums, she bared her soul in another book, Cravings: How I Conquered Food, where she opened up about her difficult relationship with food and her years of dealing with eating disorders. In 2019, she released the album Winter Stories, a collaboration with Norwegian singer Jonas Fjeld and the North Carolina country-folk quartet Chatham County Line. In 2022, she released her first studio album of all original material, entitled Spellbound.

Collins joined the judging panel for the 7th, 9th, 10th, 11th, 12th, 13th and 14th Annual Independent Music Awards.

== Activism ==
Like many other folk singers of her generation, Collins was drawn to social activism. Her political idealism led her to compose a ballad, Che, in honor of the 1960s Marxist revolutionary Che Guevara. Collins sympathized with the Yippie movement and was friendly with its leaders, Abbie Hoffman and Jerry Rubin. On March 17, 1968, she went to Hoffman's press conference at the Americana Hotel in New York to announce the party's formation. In 1969, she testified in Chicago in support of the Chicago Seven; during her testimony, she began singing Pete Seeger's "Where Have All the Flowers Gone?" and was admonished by prosecutor Tom Foran and judge Julius Hoffman.

In 1971, Collins signed her name to a Ms. campaign, "We Have Had Abortions", which called for an end to "archaic laws" regarding abortion rights; the campaign encouraged women to share their stories and take action. In 1982, she wrote the song "Mama Mama" about a mother of five and her ambivalence over her decision to abort an unintended pregnancy. In the late 1990s, she was a representative for UNICEF and campaigns on behalf of the abolition of landmines. Later songs include "River of Gold" about the environment and "My Name is Maria" about DREAMers, who are mostly undocumented students and youth.

== Personal life ==
Collins has been married twice. She was married to Peter Taylor in 1958 and they had her only child, Clark C. Taylor, who was born the same year. The marriage ended in divorce in 1965. In April 1996, she married industrial designer Louis Nelson, whom she had been seeing since April 1978. They lived in New York City. Nelson died of cancer in 2024.

In 1962, shortly after her debut at Carnegie Hall, Collins was diagnosed with tuberculosis and was in a sanatorium for six months recuperating. She is the subject of the Stephen Stills composition "Suite: Judy Blue Eyes", which appeared on the 1969 eponymous debut studio album of Crosby, Stills & Nash.

Collins suffered from bulimia nervosa after she quit smoking in the 1970s. "I went straight from the cigarettes into an eating disorder", she told People magazine in 1992. "I started throwing up. I didn't know anything about bulimia, certainly not that it is an addiction or that it would get worse. My feelings about myself, even though I had been able to give up smoking and lose 20 pounds, were of increasing despair."

She wrote at length of her years of addiction to alcohol, the damage it did to her personal and musical lives and how it contributed to her feelings of depression. Collins admits that although she tried other drugs in the 1960s, alcohol had always been her drug of first choice just as it had been for her father. She entered a rehabilitation program in Pennsylvania in 1978 and has maintained her sobriety ever since, even through such traumatic events as the death of her only child Clark by suicide in 1992 at age 33 after a long bout with clinical depression and substance abuse. Since then, she has also become an activist for suicide prevention.

Collins is a member of the Episcopal Church. In 2000, she cancelled a planned appearance and concert at the Episcopal Church's General Convention in protest of the Church's positions against gay rights. Collins stayed connected with the church, however, when it modified its stance on homosexuality issues.

== Awards and recognition ==
=== Academy Awards ===
Academy Awards
Year	Nominated work	Award	Recipients	Result	Ref
1975	Antonia: A Portrait of the Woman	Best Documentary Feature	Judy Collins and Jill Godmilow	Nominated	

- In 2003, Antonia: A Portrait of the Woman was deemed "culturally, historically, or aesthetically significant" by the United States Library of Congress and selected for preservation in the National Film Registry.

=== Grammy Awards ===
Grammy Awards
Year	Work	Award	Result	Ref
1964	Judy Collins #3	Best Folk Recording	Nominated	
1968	In My Life	Best Folk Recording	Nominated	
1969	"Both Sides, Now"	Best Folk Recording	Won	
1970	"Bird on the Wire"	Best Folk Recording	Nominated	
1975	"Send in the Clowns"	Best Pop Vocal Performance, Female	Nominated	
2017	Silver Skies Blue with Ari Hest	Best Folk Album	Nominated	
2022	Spellbound	Best Folk Album	Nominated	

- Stephen Sondheim won the 1976 Grammy Award for Song of the Year based on the popularity of Collins' performance of "Send in the Clowns" on her album Judith.

=== Other awards ===
- For her activism and musical abilities, the Americana Music Association presented Collins with the "Spirit of Americana"/Free Speech Lifetime Achievement Award at their 2005 Honors & Awards ceremony.
- She was inducted into the Colorado Women's Hall of Fame in 2006
- She was awarded an Honorary Doctor of Fine Arts Degree from Pratt Institute in May 2009
- In 2009, she received the Lifetime Achievement Award at the BBC Radio 2 Folk Awards.
- Her rendition of "Amazing Grace" was selected for preservation in the National Recording Registry by the Library of Congress as being "culturally, historically, or aesthetically significant" in 2017.
- She received the Golden Plate Award of the American Academy of Achievement in 2019.
- Collins received the International Lifetime Achievement Award at the 2023 UK Americana Awards.

== Discography ==
=== Charted albums ===
Year	Album	US	UK	AUS	NO	US Sales	Certifications
1963	Judy Collins 3	126					
1965	Fifth Album	69					
1966	In My Life	46					RIAA: Gold
1967	Wildflowers	5					RIAA: Gold
1968	Who Knows Where the Time Goes	29					RIAA: Gold
1969	Recollections	29					
1970	Whales & Nightingales	15	16	26			RIAA: Gold
1971	Living	64					
1972	Colors of the Day: The Best of Judy Collins	37					RIAA: Platinum
1973	True Stories and Other Dreams	27					
1975	Judith	17	7	19			RIAA: Platinum
1976	Bread and Roses	25		96			
1977	So Early in the Spring... The First 15 Years	42					
1979	Hard Times for Lovers	54					
1980	Running for My Life	142					
1982	Times of Our Lives	190					
1985	Amazing Grace		34	85			
2015	Strangers Again	77					
2017	Everybody Knows	195					
2019	Winter Stories	(Note: Peaked at No. 1 on the Billboard Bluegrass Albums chart)			25		
2022	Spellbound					60	

=== Charted singles ===
Year	Song	US	US AC	UK	AUS	Album
1967	"Hard Lovin' Loser"	97	–	–	–	In My Life
1968	"Both Sides, Now"	8	3	14	37	Wildflowers
1969	"Someday Soon"	55	37	–	–	Who Knows Where the Time Goes
1969	"Chelsea Morning"	78	25	–	–	(single only)
1969	"Turn! Turn! Turn! (To Everything There Is a Season)"	69	28	–	–	Recollections
1970	"Amazing Grace"	15	5	5	10	Whales & Nightingales
1971	"Open the Door (Song for Judith)"	90	23	–	–	Living
1973	"Cook with Honey"	32	10	–	–	True Stories and Other Dreams
1973	"Secret Gardens"	122	–	–	–	True Stories and Other Dreams
1975	"Send in the Clowns"	36	8	6	13	Judith
1977	"Send in the Clowns" (re-release)	19	15	–	–	Judith
1979	"Hard Times for Lovers"	66	16	–	–	Hard Times for Lovers
1984	"Home Again" (duet with T. G. Sheppard)	–	42	–	–	Home Again
1990	"Fires of Eden"	–	31	–	–	Fires of Eden

== Filmography ==
- The Doctors (1982) Judith Howard
- Guiding Light (1982) as herself
- Baby's Bedtime (1992)
- Baby's Morningtime (1992)
- Junior (1994), the operator of a spa for pregnant women
- Christy (1994–1995), recurring role as "Aunt Hattie McHone"
- Christmas at the Biltmore Estate (1998)
- A Town Has Turned to Dust (1998), telefilm based on a 1958 Rod Serling story
- The Best of Judy Collins (1999)
- Intimate Portrait: Judy Collins (2000)
- Judy Collins Live at Wolf Trap (2003)
- Wildflower Festival (2003) (DVD with guest artists Eric Andersen, Arlo Guthrie, and Tom Rush)
- Girls (2013), series 2, episode 8: "It's Back"
- Danny Says (2016)
- The Muppet Show Season 2 as herself

== Bibliography ==
- Trust Your Heart (1987)
- Amazing Grace (1991)
- Shameless (1995)
- Singing Lessons (1998)
- Sanity and Grace: A Journey of Suicide, Survival and Strength (2003)
- The Seven T's: Finding Hope and Healing in the Wake of Tragedy (2007)
- Sweet Judy Blue Eyes: My Life in Music (2011)
- Cravings: How I Conquered Food (2017)

== Certifications ==
The years given are the years the albums and singles were released and not necessarily the years in which they achieved their peaks.

U.S. Billboard Top 40 Albums

- 1967 – Wildflowers (No. 5)
- 1968 – Who Knows Where the Time Goes (No. 28)
- 1969 – Recollections (No. 29)
- 1970 – Whales & Nightingales (No. 15)
- 1972 – Colors of the Day: The Best of Judy Collins (No. 37)
- 1972 – True Stories and Other Dreams (No. 27)
- 1975 – Judith (No. 17)
- 1976 – Bread and Roses (No. 25)

U.S. Billboard Top 40 'Pop' Singles

- 1968 – "Both Sides, Now" (No. 8)
- 1971 – "Amazing Grace" (No. 15)
- 1970 – "Cook with Honey" (No. 32)
- 1975 – "Send In the Clowns" (No. 19)

U.S. Billboard Top 40 'Adult Contemporary' Singles

- 1968 – "Both Sides, Now" (No. 3)
- 1969 – "Someday Soon" (No. 37)
- 1969 – "Chelsea Morning" (No. 25)
- 1969 – "Turn! Turn! Turn! (To Everything There Is a Season)" (No. 28)
- 1971 – "Amazing Grace" (No. 5)
- 1971 – "Open the Door (Song for Judith)" (No. 23)
- 1973 – "Cook with Honey" (No. 10)
- 1975 – "Send In the Clowns" (No. 8)
- 1979 – "Hard Times for Lovers" (No. 16)
- 1990 – "Fires of Eden" (No. 31)

Albums and singles certifications

Album title	Certification
In My Life	Gold
Wildflowers	Gold
Who Knows Where the Time Goes	Gold
Whales & Nightingales	Gold
Colors of the Day	Platinum
Judith	Platinum

== See also ==
- List of peace activists

== Notes ==
Awards
Preceded by Steve Earle	First Amendment Center/AMA "Spirit of Americana" Free Speech Award; 2005	Succeeded by Charlie Daniels
