= Mark Abramson =

American record producer and artist

- Birth name: Mark Kerner Abramson
- Born: March 16, 1934; Brookline, Massachusetts, U.S.
- Died: May 20, 2007 (aged 73); Kingston, New York, U.S.
- Genres: Folk, rock
- Occupation(s): Record producer, Film director, Visual artist, Therapist
- Years active: circa 1958–1976
- Labels: Elektra Records

Mark Kerner Abramson (March 16, 1934 – May 20, 2007) was an American record producer and artist. He produced recordings of Judy Collins, The Paul Butterfield Blues Band, Bob Gibson, Love, Phil Ochs, Tom Rush, Judy Henske, Josh White, The Wackers and many other artists.

== Career ==
Starting out as one of Elektra Records' earliest producers in 1958, he learned audio engineering working closely with label founder Jac Holzman. In Holzman's history of Elektra Follow the Music, he recalls Abramson's production work: "He had a natural musical and dramatic sense and absorbed the practical aspects of engineering rapidly. He was an artist himself, with an even temperament, able to get along very well with the artists, and he became a hybrid recording engineer/producer—our first."

In addition to music production, Abramson directed art films and promotional music shorts of Love and The Doors. Notably, the films made for The Doors' "Break on Through" and "The Unknown Soldier" were early forerunners of the music video era and were shown at live concerts.

After leaving Elektra, Abramson became more involved in the visual arts, and his photography, paintings and sculpture have been exhibited in numerous galleries. In his later years, he was Program Director for Family of Woodstock in Woodstock, New York. While filming his movie and unavailable as a record producer, Judy Collins took a sabbatical, waiting for her favorite producer to return.

== Personal life and death ==
Abramson was married in 1967 to Janet (Janis) Young in a small country church near Philadelphia. Together they had two sons, Ethan and Jared. His wife was a stage, movie and television actress, appearing in The Boston Strangler with Tony Curtis- as the only potential victim to survive, and in Loving, with George Segal, as his "adulterer partner". She was a regular on the NBC soap operas, Our Five Daughters and Another World. They separated in the late 1970s, and Young went on to teach in the drama department at Bennington College for about two decades.

Mark Abramson died in May 2007.
