= The Two Sisters (folk song) =

Traditional song

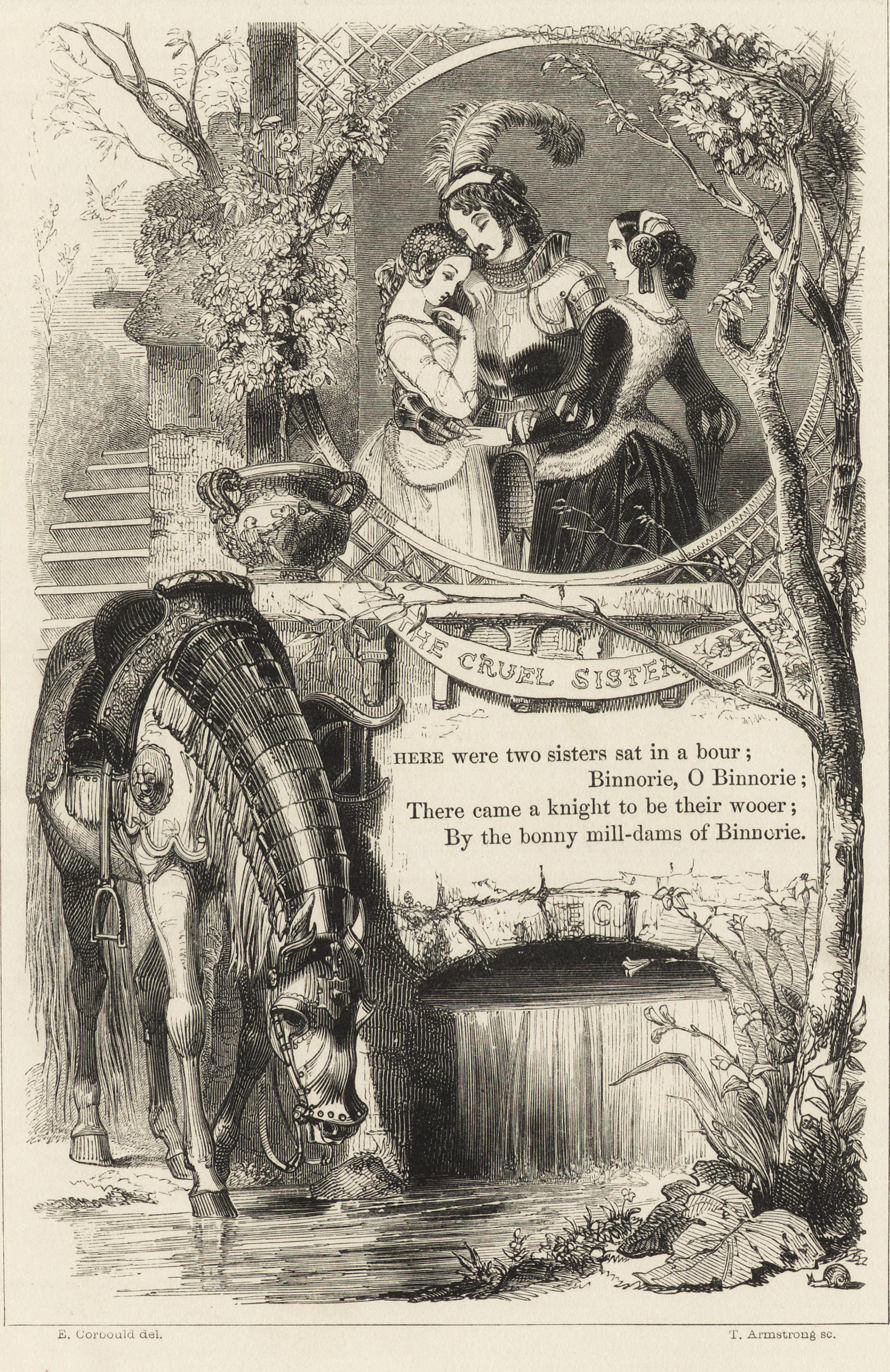
- The Cruel Sister from The Book of British Ballads (1842)

Song
- Recorded: 17th century
- Genre: murder ballad

"The Two Sisters" (also known by the Scots title "The Twa Sisters") is a traditional murder ballad, dating at least as far back as the mid 17th century. The song recounts the tale of a girl drowned by her jealous sister. At least 21 English variants exist under several names, including "Minnorie" or "Binnorie", "The Cruel Sister", "The Wind and Rain", "Dreadful Wind and Rain", "The Bonny Swans" and the "Bonnie Bows of London". The ballad was collected by renowned folklorist Francis J. Child as Child Ballad 10 and is also listed in the Roud Folk Song Index (Roud 8). Whilst the song is thought to originate somewhere around England or Scotland (possibly Northumbria), extremely similar songs have been found throughout Europe, particularly in Scandinavia.

== Synopsis ==
Two sisters go down by a body of water, sometimes a river and sometimes the sea. The older one pushes the younger in and refuses to pull her out again; generally the lyrics explicitly state her intent to drown her younger sister. Her motive, when included in the lyrics, is sexual jealousy – in some variants, the sisters are being two-timed by a suitor; in others, the elder sister's affections are not encouraged by the young man. In a few versions, a third sister is mentioned, but plays no significant role in events. In most versions, the older sister is described as dark, while the younger sister is fair.

When the murdered girl's body floats ashore, someone makes a musical instrument out of it, generally a harp or a fiddle, with a frame of bone and the girl's "long yellow hair" (or "golden hair") for strings. The instrument then plays itself and sings about the murder. In some versions, this occurs after the musician has taken it to the family's household, so that the elder sister is publicly revealed (sometimes at her wedding to the murdered girl's suitor) as the murderer.

The American variant of "The Two Sisters" typically omits the haunted instrument entirely, ending instead with an unrelated person (often a miller) robbing the murdered girl's corpse, sometimes being executed for it, and the elder sister sometimes going unpunished, or sometimes boiled in lead.

== History ==
It is first known to have appeared on a broadside in 1656 as "The Miller and the King's Daughter". Several historical resources are available via the Vaughan Williams Memorial Library, such as a manuscript of the melody and lyrics of a Scottish version entitled "Binnorie" from 1830.

Cecil Sharp collected many versions of the ballad on both sides of the Atlantic, including one from a Lucy Dunston of Bridgwater, Somerset, England in 1909, and another from a Jenny Combs of Berea, Kentucky, USA in 1917. Many authentic audio recordings have since been made (see Authentic Field Recordings).

== Parallels in other languages ==
The theme of this ballad was common in many northern European languages. There are 125 different variants known in Swedish alone. Its general Scandinavian classification is TSB A 38; and it is (among others) known as Den talende strengeleg or De to søstre (DgF 95), or Der boede en Mand ved Sønderbro in Danish, Hørpu ríma (CCF 136)in Faroese, Hörpu kvæði (IFkv 13) in Icelandic, Dei tvo systar in Norwegian, and De två systrarna (SMB 13) in Swedish. It has also spread further south; for example, as Gosli iz človeškega telesa izdajo umor (A Fiddle Made from a Human Body Reveals a Murder) in Slovenian.

In the Norse variants, the older sister is depicted as dark and the younger as fair, often with great contrast, comparing the former to soot and the other to the sun or milk. This can inspire taunts from the younger about the older's looks. However, in the Danish variant Der boede en Mand ved Sønderbro, the older sister takes the younger sister who has been intimate with a shared suitor down to a river indicating that they may both be washed clean (literally, 'white'), implying that the dark-light theme has broader implications; nevertheless the elder sister, in the act of drowning the younger over jealousy, thereby assumes upon herself any stain that could have been construed to have been upon the younger sister, as well as the act of murder which she has now committed.

In some variants, the story ends with the instrument being broken and the younger sister returning to life. In a few, she was not actually drowned, but saved and nursed back to health; she tells the story herself.

This tale is also found in prose form, in fairy tales such as The Singing Bone, where the siblings are brothers instead of sisters. This is widespread throughout Europe; often the motive is not jealousy because of a lover, but the younger child's success in winning the object that will cure the king, or that will win the father's inheritance.

A Ukrainian version of the folk song has the same name "Two sisters" and also known by the song's first line "Ой, світив місяць ще й дві зорі" meaning "The moon and two stars are shining." The story is about the older sister who was jealous about the beauty of the younger sister so she tricked the younger sister to come with her by the Danube river where she pushed her in to the river. When the girl started drowning and screamed for help the older sister threw her a yellow shawl saying: here it is for since you are the most beautiful of all.

In Polish literature from the Romantic period, a similar theme is found in the play Balladyna (1838) by Juliusz Słowacki. Two sisters engage in a raspberry-gathering contest to decide which of them gets to marry Prince Kirkor. When the younger Alina wins, the older Balladyna kills her. Finally, she is killed by a bolt of lightning in an act of divine retribution.

A Hungarian version exists, where a king has three daughters. The older two are bad and ugly and envy the younger child sister because of her beauty. One day, they murder her in the forest and place her corpse inside a fiddle. The fiddle plays music on its own and eventually is given to the royal family. The fiddle does not play for the evil sisters, but the princess is restored to life once her father tries to play it. The sisters are imprisoned, but the good princess pardons them once she becomes queen.

The ballad also appears in a number of guises in Scottish Gaelic, under the name "A' Bhean Eudach" or "The Jealous Woman." In many of the Scottish Gaelic variants the cruel sister murders her sibling while she is sleeping by knotting her hair into the seaweed on a rock at low tide. When she wakes the tide is coming in fast and as she is drowning she sings the song, detailing her tragic end.

== Connections to other ballads ==
As is frequently found with traditional folksongs, versions of The Two Sisters are associated with tunes that are used in common with several other ballads. For example, at least one variant of this ballad ("Cruel Sister") uses the tune and refrain from "Lay the bent to the bonny broom", a widely used song (whose original lyrics are lost) which is also used, for example, by some versions of "Riddles Wisely Expounded" (Child 1).

Canadian singer and harpist Loreena McKennitt's song "The Bonny Swans" is a pastiche of several traditional variants of the ballad. The first stanza mentions the third sister, but she subsequently disappears from the narrative. The song recounts a tale in which a young woman is drowned by her jealous older sister in an effort to gain the younger sister's beloved. The girl's body washes up near a mill, where the miller's daughter mistakes her corpse for that of a swan. Later, after she is pulled from the water, a passing harper fashions a harp from the bones and hair of the dead girl; the harp plays alone, powered by the girl's soul. The harp is brought to her father's hall and plays before the entire court, telling of her sister's crime. The song also mentions her brother named Hugh, and her beloved William, and gives a name to the older sister, Anne.

An early Alfred Lord Tennyson poem, "The Sisters", also bears a resemblance to the ballad: a sister scorned in love who murders the lover of her sister, and possibly the sister too, out of jealousy.

In Germany, there is a ballad called Das steinerne Brot (stone bread) which is also sometimes known as Zwei Schwestern (two sisters).

== Versions and settings ==
=== Authentic field recordings ===
Approximately 139 recordings have been made of authentic versions of the ballad sung by traditional singers, mostly in the United States and Scotland. The following are examples of these recordings:

- Ethel Findlater of Dounby, Orkney, Scotland, recorded by Peter Kennedy in 1954.
- Lucy Stewart of Fetterangus, Aberdeenshire, Scotland, recorded by James Madison Carpenter, Peter Kennedy / Hamish Henderson in 1955, and Kenneth Goldstein in 1959.
- Christina MacAllister of Aberdeenshire, Scotland, recorded by Ewan MacColl and Peggy Seeger, 1962.
- Helen Scott of Fraserburgh, Aberdeenshire, Scotland, recorded by Kenneth Goldstein, 1960.
- George Fradley of Sudbury, Derbyshire, England, recorded by Mike Yates, 1984.
- Horton Barker of Chilhowie, Virginia, United States, recorded by Arthur K. Davis, 1932.
- Charles Ingenthron of Walnut Shade, Missouri, USA, recorded by Randolph Vance, 1941.
- Jean Ritchie of Viper, Kentucky USA, recorded by Artus Moser and recorded separately with her sisters by Mary Elizabeth Barnicle in 1946.

=== Other versions and settings ===
- Andrew Bird recorded a setting titled "Two Sisters" as the fifth track of his album Music of Hair.
- Martin Carthy and Dave Swarbrick recorded a version titled "The Bows of London".
- The Irish group Clannad has a version titled "Two Sisters" on their album Dúlamán. This version inspired the name of Minneapolis Celtic-rock band Boiled in Lead.
- Oli Steadman included it on his song collection "365 Days Of Folk".
- Bob Dylan performed "Two Sisters" in the late 1950s and early 1960s, and a recording of an impromptu version in the apartment of his friend Karen Wallace from May 1960 appears on The Genuine Bootleg Series, Take 2. He also based "Percy's Song" on the variant "The Wind and the Rain".
- Jerry Garcia and his acoustic band recorded Jody Stecher's version of the ballad, "Dreadful Wind and Rain", on their 1988 album Almost Acoustic, and another recording, by Jerry Garcia and David Grisman, was later included in the 1996 posthumous album Shady Grove album.
- Folk metal band In Extremo recorded an Old Norwegian version of the song ("Two søstra") for the last track of their debut album Weckt Die Toten!.
- Ewan MacColl recorded a version in Scots called "Minorie" which can be found on several of his recordings.
- Folk singer Peggy Seeger recorded a version entitled "O The Wind and Rain" on her album Bring Me Home, and another version entitled Two Sisters based on Horton Barker's previously mentioned recordings.
- Julie Fowlis recorded another version of this song, titled "Wind and Rain".
- Pentangle released their album Cruel Sister in 1970, the title track being a rendition of this ballad.
- Rachel Unthank and the Winterset recorded "Cruel Sister" on their album Cruel Sister.
- Tom Waits includes his own version of "Two Sisters" on the Bastards disc of his Orphans: Brawlers, Bawlers & Bastards trilogy.
- Julia Wolfe composed an instrumental rendition of the ballad titled Cruel Sister in 2004.
- Custer Larue recorded the song on her album The Daemon Lover.
- The Irish band Altan recorded a version of the ballad "The Wind and Rain" on their 2005 album Local Ground.
- Loreena McKennitt covered a version of the tale "The Bonny Swans" on her fifth studio album The Mask and Mirror (1994).
- Bellowhead recorded a version called "Wind & Rain" for their album Broadside.
- Nico Muhly composed a version called "The Only Tune" for folk musician Sam Amidon in 2007.
- Norwegian folk band Folque recorded a version called "Harpa" on their 1974 self-titled debut album.
- John Jacob Niles recorded an eight-verse version of the song, collected from Arlie Tolliver of Cumberland, Kentucky in 1932.
- Old Blind Dogs recorded a version called "The Cruel Sister" on their 1993 album Close to the Bone.
- Méav Ní Mhaolchatha recorded a version titled "The Wicked Sister" on her album Silver Sea.
- Progressive bluegrass band Crooked Still recorded a version called "Wind and Rain" on their 2006 album Shaken by a Low Sound.
- The Folk metal band Subway to Sally recorded a German version called "Grausame Schwester" on their 2014 album Mitgift.
- Celtic rock band Tempest recorded "Two Sisters" on their 2001 album Balance.
- The pagan-folk Band Omnia recorded a version called "Harp of Death" on their 2016 album Prayer.
- The musical Ghost Quartet draws from this ballad as inspiration, as well as having a version of the ballad called "The Wind & Rain".
- Indie-rock band Okkervil River on the 10th Anniversary edition of their album Black Sheep Boy, titled "Oh, the Wind and Rain".
- Rab Noakes and Kathleen MacInnes constructed an arrangement in 2013 joining a Scots/English version and a Scots Gaelic version back-to-back. Rab recorded his Scots/English part of it on his I'm walkin' here album, released on Neon Records in 2015.
- Folk rock band Steeleye Span recorded "Two Sisters" on their 2016 album Dodgy Bastards.
- Traditional Irish/bluegrass band We Banjo 3 recorded "Two Sisters" on their 2016 album String Theory.
- Alasdair Roberts recorded a version called "The Two Sisters" on his album Too Long in This Condition.
- Rachael McShane & The Cartographers recorded a version called "Two Sisters" on their 2018 album When All Is Still.
- House and Land recorded a version called "Two Sisters" as the first track on their album Across the Field (2019), and the group's name is in the song's lyrics.
- June Tabor & Oysterband recorded a version called "I'll Show You Wonders" on their 2019 album Fire & Fleet, which was available at gigs and via their website.
- Emily Portman recorded a haunting version accompanied by a harp called “Two Sisters” on her debut album “The Glamoury” in 2010.
- Swedish folk band Garmarna recorded "Två systrar" on their 2020 album Förbundet.
- Sverre Jensen's mediaeval group Aurora Borealis recorded 13 Scandinavian and British versions from Norway, Sweden, Scotland, Finland, Denmark, the Faeroes and England. The album is titled Harpa, which is the predominant Norwegian name for the ballad, was recorded on authentic mediaeval instruments and was released by Grappa Musikkforlag 4132 in 1999.< CD sleevenotes >
- Anita Best and Rachel Morgan recorded "The Two Sisters" on their album The Colour of Amber.
- Brian McNeill and Iain MacKintosh recorded "The Wind and Rain" on their album "Live & Kicking" in 2000.
- The Italian folk band Emian produced an Italian-language version of the song titled "Le due sorelle" in 2019.

=== Retellings in other media ===
- Cyril Rootham's three-act opera The two sisters (1918–21, libretto by Marjory Fausset) is based on "The Twa Sisters O'Binnorie"; it opens with an unaccompanied rendition of six verses of the ballad instead of an overture.
- Percy Grainger's Danish Folksongs Suite (1926–41) incorporates melodic material the composer had noted down in 1923 from a traditional Jutish version sung by "folksongstress" Ane Nielsen Post.
- A prose version of the story was featured in Time Life's series The Enchanted World, in "Ghosts" volume in 1984. It appeared under the title, "Song of the Sorrowing Harp."
- A version of the tale by Patricia C. Wrede called "Cruel Sisters" appears in her 1996 anthology Book of Enchantments, detailing the tale including the minstrel, as told from the perspective of the third sister who often disappears in other versions of the tale. This version casts doubt on whether the accusing deceased sister is telling the truth.
- "Binnorie" in Joseph Jacobs' English Fairy Tales (1890).
- Mercedes Lackey used the tale as part of the plot of her 2016 book A Study in Sable, part of her Elemental Masters series.
- In the novel Assassin's Quest by Robin Hobb, the narrator reflects on the content of this "familiar song" he overhears at the royal court.
- In the Sarah J. Maas book A Court of Mist and Fury (the second book in A Court of Thorns and Roses series), The Weaver sings a song referencing this story.
- In the Witcher videogame, the quest "The Heat of the Day" is a retelling of the Polish version of the ballad, including the reference to the patch of raspberries.
- The video game Her Story includes the interviewee, played by Viva Seifert performing a version of the song on acoustic guitar.
- Marie Brennan retells the story at Cruel Sisters.
- Caitlín R. Kiernan's "The Ammonite Violin (Murder Ballad No. 4)" is a variation on the story.
- Lucy Holland's "Sistersong" is a retelling with the two sisters as two of the three perspective characters.
- In the Phryne Fisher novel Death in Dayleford by Kerry Greenwood the character Dot makes a reference to the song "The Cruel Sister".
- The Ursula Vernon novel Minor Mage, written under the pen name T. Kingfisher, features a character whose special skill is making instruments from the corpses of murder victims so they can tell the story of who killed them.
- The Amal El-Mohtar novella The River Has Roots is a reimagining of the ballad.

== See also ==
- List of the Child Ballads
- Fair, Brown and Trembling
- The Juniper Tree

== Works cited ==
Child, Frances James (1882). The English and Scottish Popular Ballads. Vol. I. Houghton, Mifflin and Company.. Available at Archive.org here
