= The Farmer's Curst Wife =

Traditional song

The Farmer's Curst Wife is a traditional English language folk song listed as Child ballad number 278 and number 160 in the Roud Folk Song Index.

The lyrics of the ballad are sometimes sung to the melody of the song Lillibullero.

Robert Burns based his 1792 poem "Carle of Killyburn Braes" on the ballad.

== Synopsis ==
A farmer has a wife who causes him stress. One day, the Devil takes her away to Hell. In Hell, the wife commits violent acts. She makes life in hell so bad that the Devil brings her back to her husband.

== Traditional versions ==
=== Ritchie family ===
When Cecil Sharp visited the Ritchie family of Viper, Kentucky in 1917 on his journey to collect traditional songs, he was excited to hear their version of the ballad (which they called "The Little Devils"), because it included a whistled refrain that Sharp had read about having once existed in Britain. Jean Ritchie recalled the tale of her sisters Una and Sabrina learning the lyrics of the song from their uncle Jason in order to sing it to Cecil Sharp, whose transcription of their performance can be viewed via the Vaughan Williams Memorial Library.

Alan Lomax recorded Jean Ritchie singing the song in 1949, and the recording is freely available online courtesy of the Alan Lomax archive. She then recorded the song in 1952 on her album Singing the Traditional Songs of Her Kentucky Mountain Family. The Ritchie family version ends with the humorous verse:

Oh the women they are so much better than men, When they go to hell they get sent back again.

=== United States ===
Other versions were collected in the United States. The Appalachian musicians Nimrod Workman, Horton Barker, Texas Gladden and Aunt Molly Jackson all recorded their own traditional versions of the song around the middle of the twentieth century. Elsewhere in the US, James "Iron Head" Baker and Ollie Gilbert had their versions recorded. Texas Gladden's 1932 recording can be heard online via the University of Virginia Library website.

=== Britain ===
A recording made by James Madison Carpenter of a male singer in Bampton, Oxfordshire in the 1930s can be heard on the Vaughan Williams Memorial Library website. Jimmy White of Whittingham, Northumberland was recorded singing the ballad in 1954, as was Alan Rogerson of nearby Wooler, Northumberland in 1958. Walter Pardon of Norfolk also recorded his traditional version. English versions such as that of George "Pop" Maynard which can be heard on the British Library Sound Archive website, include the whistling refrain that Cecil Sharp thought had been lost in Britain, albeit a different tune to the Ritchie version. It has also been recorded by a handful of Scottish singers.

=== Ireland ===
Seamus Ennis recorded an acclaimed version in his 1957 album The Bonny Bunch of Roses. Another acclaimed version of the song is by Thomas Moran

== Lyrics ==
The following lyrics were recorded in James Henry Dixon's Ancient Poems, Ballads, and Songs of the Peasantry of England (1857):

1 There was an old farmer in Sussex did dwell,

(chorus of whistlers)

There was an old farmer in Sussex did dwell,

And he had a bad wife, as many knew well.

(chorus of whistlers)

2 Then Satan came to the old man at the plough:

'One of your family I must have now.

3 'It is not your eldest son that I crave,

But it is your old wife, and she I will have.'

4 'O welcome, good Satan, with all my heart!

I hope you and she will never more part.

5 Now Satan has got the old wife on his back,

And he lugged her along, like a pedlar's pack.

6 He trudged away till they came to his hall-gate;

Says he, Here, take in an old Sussex chap's mate.

7 O then she did kick the young imps about;

Says one to the other, Let's try turn her out.

8 She spied thirteen imps all dancing in chains,

She up with her pattens and beat out their brains.

9 She knocked the old Satan against the wall!

'Let's turn her out, or she'll murder us all.'

10 Now he's bundled her up on his back amain,

And to her old husband he took her again.

11 'I have been a tormentor the whole of my life,

But I neer was tormented so as with your wife.'

== Popular recordings ==
- Patrick Sky on his 1966 album A Harvest of Gentle Clang
- Pete Seeger
- Hannah James and Sam Sweeney
- Bellowhead
- John Koerner
