= Pretty Saro =

English folk ballad

"Pretty Saro" (Roud 417) is an English folk ballad originating in the early 1700s. The song died out in England by the mid eighteenth century but was rediscovered in North America (particularly in the Appalachian Mountains) in the early twentieth century, where it had been preserved through oral traditions. Cecil Sharp and later folklorists and proponents of the folk revival helped keep songs such as "Pretty Saro" alive well into modern times.

== Traditional Versions ==
The famous Appalachian musician Jean Ritchie was recorded with her sisters in 1946 by Mary Elizabeth Barnacle singing her family's traditional version on the song, before recording it on the album Jean Ritchie And Doc Watson At Folk City (1963). The Appalachian traditional singer Horton Barker also recorded a traditional version on his eponymous 1962 album. Several other traditional Appalachian versions were recorded, particularly by Alan Lomax. A few traditional Ozark recordings were also made (many of which can be heard online), and one in Toronto, Canada.

== Popular Recordings ==
Notable artists who have recorded Pretty Saro include:

Artist	Album
Derroll Adams	65th Birthday Concert
Sam Amidon	All is Well
Judy Collins	A Maid of Constant Sorrow
Shirley Collins and Davy Graham	Folk Roots, New Routes
Iris Dement	Songcatcher
Bob Dylan	The Bootleg Series Vol. 10 – Another Self Portrait (1969–1971)
Chris Jones	Cloud of Dust
Bruce Molsky and Big Hoedown	Bruce Molsky and Big Hoedown
Ashley Monroe featuring Aubrey Haynie	Divided & United: The Songs of the Civil War
Jay Munly	Galvanized Yankee
Pete Seeger	God Bless the Grass
Doc Watson	Home Again!
The Dixie Bee-Liners	Through My Screen Door
John Doyle	Evening Comes Early
Bert Jansch	A Rare Conundrum
Rhiannon Giddens	Music from The American Epic Sessions: Original Motion Picture Soundtrack
Bluecoats Drum and Bugle Corps	Session 44
Martin Simpson	Live (1996)
The Westerlies	The Westerlies
Stephen Wake	The Mystical Land (2020)
Rocketship	Rarities
American Patchwork Quartet	American Patchwork Quartet (2024)
Sam Shackleton	Scottish Cowboy Ballads & Early American Folk Songs (2025)

During his Self Portrait sessions in March 1970 at Columbia Records' New York studio, Bob Dylan ran through "Pretty Saro" six consecutive times. While none of those versions made the final cut for the album, the song remained in Columbia's vault, until it was released on Another Self Portrait, a 35-track box set of songs cut for Nashville Skyline, Self Portrait and New Morning.
