= Down by the Glenside (The Bold Fenian Men) =

Irish rebel song

Song
- Genre: Irish rebel song
- Lyricist(s): Peadar Kearney

"Down by the Glenside" (Roud 9266, also known as "The Bold Fenian Men") is an Irish rebel song written by Peadar Kearney, an Irish Republican and composer of numerous rebel songs, including "The Soldier's Song" ("Amhrán na bhFiann"), now the Irish national anthem, and "The Tri-coloured Ribbon".

Kearney was a member of the Irish Republican Brotherhood, popularly known as the Fenians. He wrote the song at about the time of the 1916 Rising, referring back to the earlier Fenian Rising of 1867. It evokes the memory of the freedom-fighters of the previous generation (strong, manly forms...eyes with hope gleaming), as recalled by an old woman down by the glenside. It is effectively a call to arms for a generation of Irishmen accustomed to political nationalism.

== Versions ==
Three verses to this song were sung by Ken Curtis and The Sons of the Pioneers in the 1950 John Ford movie Rio Grande, though the film was set in the 19th-century Wild West.

Richard Dyer-Bennet recorded the song on his first self produced LP Richard Dyer-Bennet 1, (1955). The song became popular again in the 1960s, when it was recorded by The Clancy Brothers. It has since been recorded by numerous artists, including The Dubliners, Cherish The Ladies, Omnia, Mary O'Hara, Screaming Orphans, Jim McCann, Harry O'Donoghue, and The Wolfe Tones.

The song is also sung in the first episode of the BBC series Days of Hope, written by Jim Allen and directed by Ken Loach. An Irish barmaid (played by Tríona Ní Dhomhnaill, credited as Triona O'Donnell) is forced to sing after being sexually harassed by British soldiers and impresses them with her song.

A version of the song (Down by the Glenside) appears on Brigid Mae Power's 2023 album Dream from the Deep Well.

== Lyrics ==
'Twas down by the glenside, I met an old woman
A-plucking young nettles, she ne'er saw me coming
I listened a while to the song she was humming
Glory O, Glory O, to the bold Fenian men

'Tis fifty long years since I saw the moon beaming
On strong manly forms, on eyes with hope gleaming
I see them again, sure, in all my sad dreaming
Glory O, Glory O, to the bold Fenian men.

When I was a young girl, their marching and drilling
Awoke in the glenside sounds awesome and thrilling
They loved dear old Ireland, to die they were willing
Glory O, Glory O, to the bold Fenian men.

Some died by the glenside, some died near a stranger
And wise men have told us their cause was a failure
But they stood by old Ireland and never feared danger
Glory O, Glory O, to the bold Fenian men

I passed on my way, God be praised that I met her
Be life long or short, sure I'll never forget her
We may have brave men, but we'll never have better
Glory O, Glory O, to the bold Fenian men
