= Jean Ritchie =

American folk singer, songwriter and musician (1922–2015)

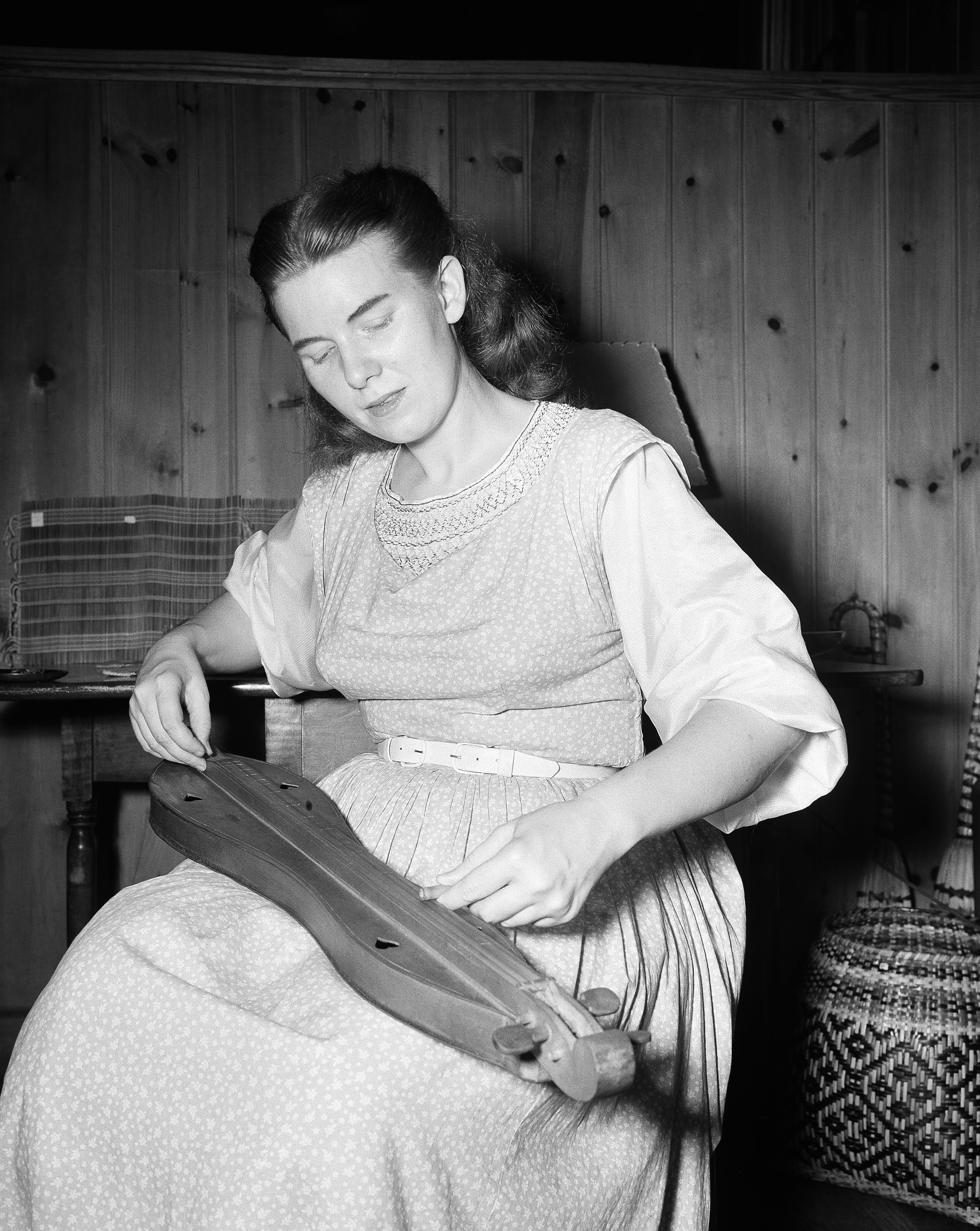
- Ritchie playing the dulcimer, c. 1950s
- Born: Jean Ruth Ritchie; December 8, 1922; Viper, Kentucky, U.S.
- Died: June 1, 2015 (aged 92); Berea, Kentucky, U.S.
- Education: University of Kentucky
- Occupation: Folk musician
- Labels: Folkways; Elektra; Sire; Greenhays; Flying Fish; Riverside; Warner Bros.; Tradition
- Spouse: George Pickow (m. 1950; died 2010)
- Children: Jonathan and Peter Pickow (1958–2020 and 1954-)

Jean Ruth Ritchie (December 8, 1922 – June 1, 2015) was an American folk singer, songwriter, and Appalachian dulcimer player, called by some the "Mother of Folk". In her youth she learned hundreds of folk songs in the traditional way (orally, from her family and community), many of which were Appalachian variants of centuries-old English, Scottish and Irish songs, including dozens of Child Ballads. In adulthood, she shared these songs with wide audiences, as well as writing some of her own songs using traditional foundations.

She is ultimately responsible for the revival of the Appalachian dulcimer, the traditional instrument of her community, which she popularized by playing the instrument on her albums and writing tutorial books.

She also spent time collecting folk music in the United States and in Britain and Ireland, in order to research the origins of her family songs and help preserve traditional music.

She inspired a wide array of musicians, including Bob Dylan, Joan Baez, Shirley Collins, Joni Mitchell, Emmylou Harris and Judy Collins.

== Out of Kentucky ==
=== Family ===
Jean Ritchie was born to Abigail (née Hall) Ritchie (1877–1972) and Balis Wilmar Ritchie (1869–1958) of Viper, an unincorporated community in Perry County in the Cumberland Mountains of southeastern Kentucky. Along with the Combs family of adjacent Knott County, (Note: The Combs family repertoire formed the basis of a doctoral thesis on the British ballads in America by Professor and dulcimer specialist Josiah Combs of Berea College for the Sorbonne University, published in Paris in 1925. Combs' book was translated by D. K. Wilgus in 1967 as Folk-Songs of the Southern United States (Folk-Songs Du Midi Des Etats-Unis) (Austin: University of Texas Press).) the Ritchies of Perry County were one of the two "great ballad-singing families" of Kentucky celebrated among folk song scholars. Jean's father Balis had printed up a book of old songs entitled Lovers' Melodies in 1910 or 1911, which contained the most popular songs in Hindman at that time, including "Jackaro", "Lord Thomas and Fair Ellender", "False Sir John and May Colvin" and "The Lyttle Musgrave". However, Balis preferred playing the Appalachian dulcimer to singing, often singing entire ballads in his head along with his dulcimer playing. In 1917, the folk music collector Cecil Sharp collected songs from Jean's older sisters May (1896–1982) and Una (1900–1989), whilst her sister Edna (1910–1997) also learnt the old ballads, much later releasing her own album of traditional songs with dulcimer accompaniment. Most of the Ritchie siblings seemed dedicated to performing and preserving traditional music. Many of the Ritchies attended the Hindman Settlement School, a folk school where students were encouraged to cherish their own backgrounds and where Sharp found many of his songs. It is possible that many of the Ritchies' songs were absorbed from neighbors, relatives, friends, school mates and even books, as well as being passed through the family.

The paternal ancestors of the Ritchie family, Alexander Ritchie (1725–1787) and his son James Ritchie Sr. (1757–1818) of Stewarton, East Ayrshire, Scotland, emigrated to the United States. James Ritchie Sr. fought in the Revolutionary War in 1776 (including at the Siege of Yorktown), and lived in Virginia before settling on Carr Creek in what is now Knott County, Kentucky, with his family. When he drowned in 1818, his family moved back to Virginia except his son Alexander Crockett Ritchie Sr. (1778–1878), Jean Ritchie's great-great-grandfather.

Most of the Ritchies later fought on the Confederate side in the Civil War, including Jean's paternal grandfather Justice Austin Ritchie (1834–1899), who was 2nd Lieutenant of Company C of the 13th Kentucky Confederate Cavalry.

Alan Lomax wrote that:

They were quiet, thoughtful folks, who went in for ballads, big families and educating their children. Jean's grandmother was a prime mover in the Old Regular Baptist Church, and all the traditional hymn tunes came from her. Jean's Uncle Jason was a lawyer, who remembers the big ballads like "Lord Barnard". Jean's father taught school, printed a newspaper, fitted specs, farmed and sent ten of his fourteen children to college.

Her "uncle" Jason (1860–1959), who was actually her father's cousin, practiced law while owning a farm in Talcum, Knott County, Kentucky. He was the source of several of Jean Ritchie's songs and Cecil Sharp narrowly missed meeting him in 1917, stating in his diary that "they couldn't get hold of him".

=== Early life ===
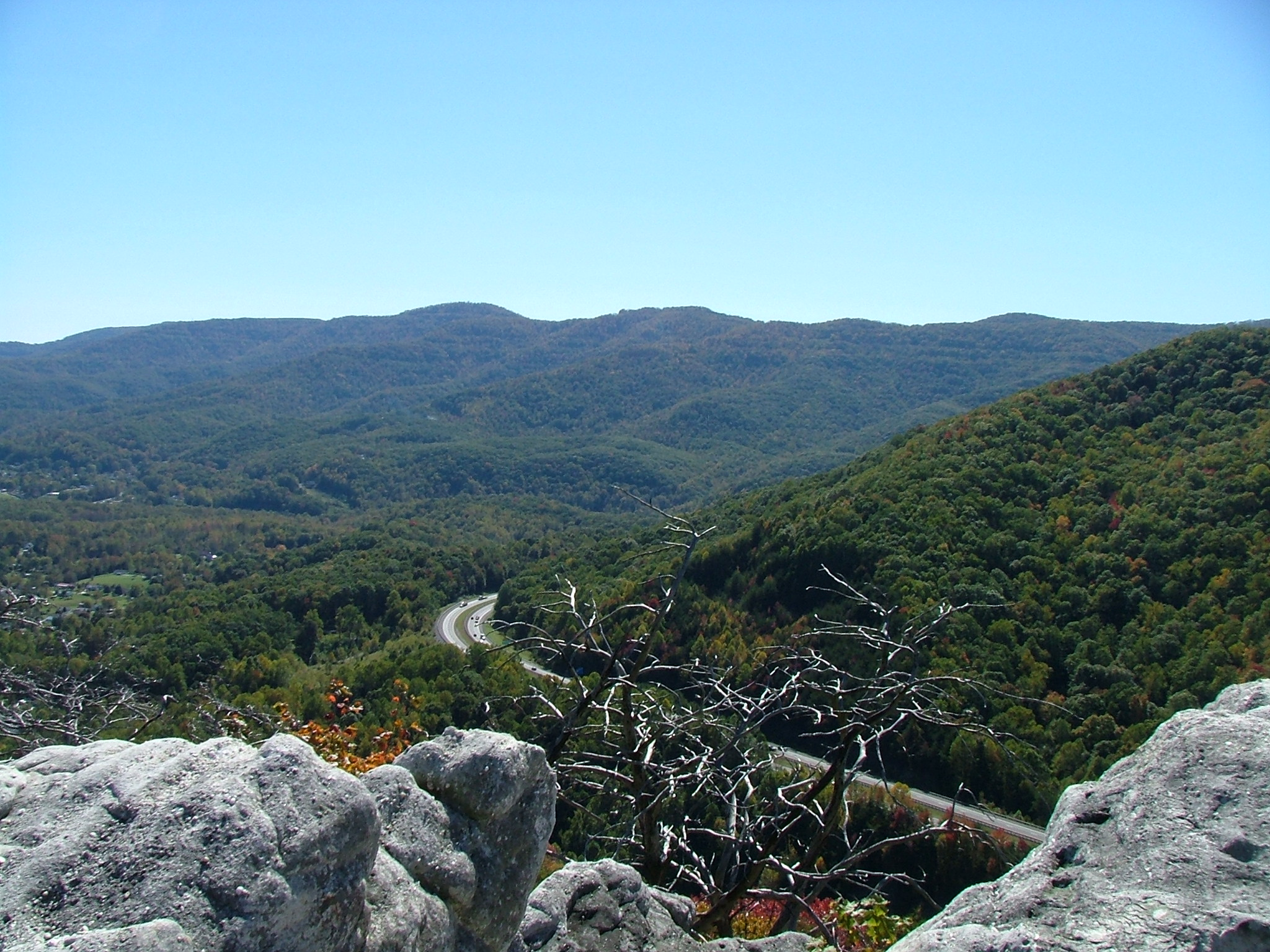
The Cumberland Mountains

As the youngest of 14 siblings, Ritchie was one of ten girls who slept in one room of the farming family's farm house. Ritchie and her family sang for entertainment, but also to accompany their manual work. When the family gathered to sing songs, they chose from a repertoire of over 300 songs including hymns, old ballads, and popular songs by composers such as Stephen Foster, which were mostly learnt orally and sung unaccompanied. The Ritchies would sing improvised harmonies to accompany some of their songs, including "Pretty Saro".

Ritchie graduated from high school in Viper and enrolled in Cumberland Junior College (now a four-year University of the Cumberlands) in Williamsburg, Kentucky, and from there graduated Phi Beta Kappa with a B.A. in social work from the University of Kentucky in Lexington in 1946. At college she participated in the glee club and choir as well as learning the piano. According to Ritchie, Maud Karpeles later said "[Ritchie] cannot be termed a folksinger, because she has been to college," which she took as a compliment.

During World War II, she taught in an elementary school. Meanwhile, in 1946, whilst still in Kentucky, Ritchie was recorded performing traditional songs with her sisters Edna, Kitty, and Pauline by Mary Elizabeth Barnicle and by Artus Moser.

== New York ==
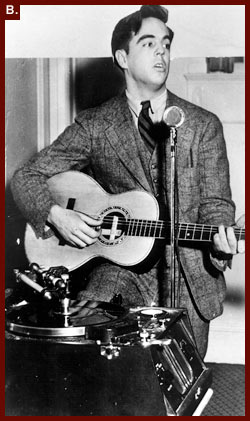
Alan Lomax

After graduating she got a job as a social worker at the Henry Street Settlement in New York, where she taught her Appalachian songs and traditions to local children. This caught the attention of folk singers, scholars, and enthusiasts based in New York, and she befriended Woody Guthrie, Oscar Brand, Pete Seeger, and Alan Lomax. To many, Ritchie represented the ideal traditional musician, due to her rural upbringing, dulcimer playing, and the fact her songs came from within her family.

In 1948, Ritchie shared a stage with The Weavers, Woody Guthrie, and Betty Sanders at the Spring Fever Hootenanny. By October 1949, she was a regular guest on Oscar Brand's Folksong Festival radio show on WNYC.

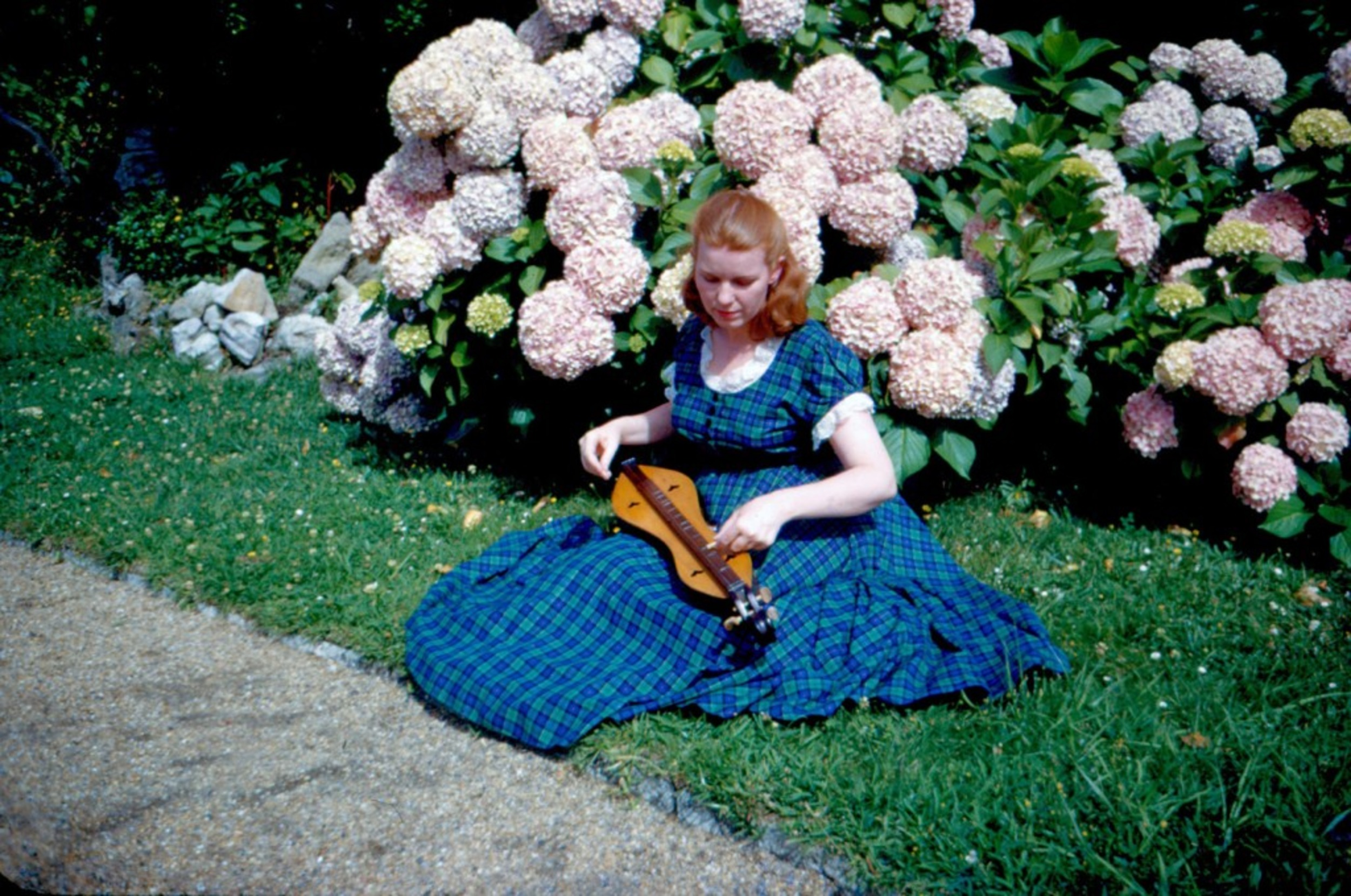
Ritchie playing the dulcimer in 1950, photo from the Library of Congress

In 1949 and 1950, she recorded several hours of songs, stories, and oral history for Lomax in New York City. All of Lomax's recordings of Ritchie are available online courtesy of the Lomax Digital Archive. She was recorded extensively for the Library of Congress in 1951.

By 1951, Ritchie became a full-time singer, folksong collector, and songwriter. Elektra records signed her and she released her first album of family songs, Singing the Traditional Songs of Her Kentucky Mountain Family (1952), which included family versions of such songs as "Gypsum Davy", "The Cuckoo", and "The Little Devils", a song which had particularly fascinated Cecil Sharp when he heard it from Una and Sabrina Ritchie in 1917.

== Fulbright expedition ==
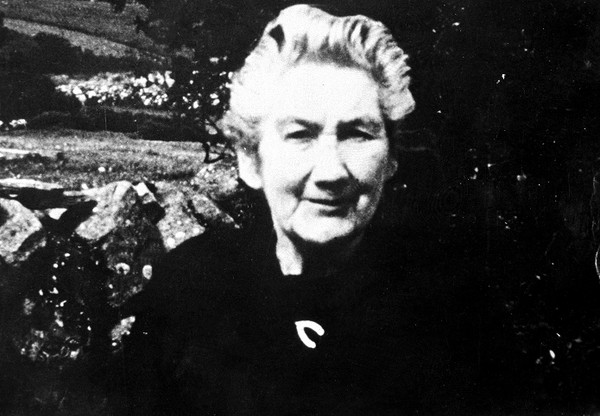
Elizabeth Cronin

In 1952, Ritchie was awarded a Fulbright scholarship to trace the links between American ballads and the songs from England, Scotland, and Ireland. As a song-collector, she began by setting down the 300 songs that she already knew from her mother's knee. Ritchie and her husband, George Pickow, then spent 18 months tape recording, interviewing and photographing singers, including Elizabeth Cronin, Tommy and Sarah Makem, Leo Rowsome, and Seamus Ennis in Ireland; Jeannie Robertson and Jimmy MacBeath in Scotland; and Harry Cox and Bob Roberts in England. When people asked what sort of songs they were looking for, Ritchie would sometimes ask them if they knew Barbara Allen and sing a few verses for them. In 1954, Ritchie released some of the British and Irish recordings on the album Field Trip, side by side with Ritchie family versions of the same songs. A broader selection was issued by Folkways on the two LPs Field Trip–England (1959) and As I Roved Out (Field Trip–Ireland) (1960). Some transcriptions and photographs were later published in Ritchie's book From Fair to Fair: Folksongs of the British Isles (1966).

While in Britain, Ritchie sang at concerts for the English Folk Dance and Song Society, including its annual Royal Albert Hall festival, and presented several BBC radio programmes, appearing on The Ballad-Hunter which was presented by her friend Alan Lomax. On one occasion, Maud Karpeles took Ritchie and Pickow to visit Ralph Vaughan Williams and his wife Ursula, for whom she sang "Come All Ye Fair and Tender Ladies"; Pickow photographed the four of them together.

== Musical achievements ==
In 1955, Ritchie wrote a book about her family called Singing Family of the Cumberlands. The book documented the role of the family songs in everyday life, such as accompanying everyday tasks on the farm and in the home, or being sung when gathered on the porch in the evening to "sing the moon up." Singing Family of the Cumberlands is widely regarded as an American classic, and continues to be used in American schools.

As well as work songs and ballads, Ritchie knew hymns from the "Old Regular Baptist" church she attended in Jeff, Kentucky. These were sung as "lining out" songs, in a lingering soulful way, including the song "Amazing Grace," which she helped popularize. Family versions of "Amazing Grace" and the hymn "Brightest And Best" were released on the 1959 album Jean Ritchie Interviews Her Family, With Documentary Recordings.

Ritchie directed and sang at the first Newport Folk Festival in 1959, and served on the first folklore panel for the National Endowment for the Arts.

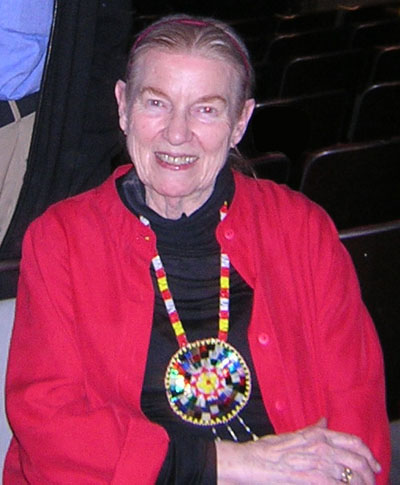
Ritchie after a performance on April 26, 2008

Her album Ballads from Her Appalachian Family Tradition (1961) compiled many traditional Ritchie family versions of Child Ballads, including "False Sir John," "Hangman," "Lord Bateman," "Barbary Allen," "There Lived an Old Lord (Two Sisters)," "The Cherry-Tree Carol" and "Edward."

Her traditional version of "My Dear Companion" (Roud 411) appeared on the album Trio recorded by Linda Ronstadt, Dolly Parton, and Emmylou Harris. Judy Collins recorded some of Ritchie's traditional songs, "Tender Ladies" and "Pretty Saro," and also used a photograph by George Pickow on the front of her album "Golden Apples of the Sun" (1962).

In 1963, Ritchie recorded an album with Doc Watson entitled Jean Ritchie and Doc Watson Live at Folk City (1963). The traditional Appalachian song "Shady Grove" was popularized by Doc Watson after he most likely learnt it from Jean Ritchie, who in turn learned it from her father Balis Ritchie.

As folk music became more popular in the 1960s, new political songs overshadowed the traditional ballads. Whilst Ritchie largely stuck to the traditional songs, she wrote and recorded Kentucky-themed songs with wider implications, such as the destruction of the environment by loggers and the strip-mining techniques of coal firms. These songs included "Blue Diamond Mines," "Black Waters," and "The L&N Don't Stop Here Anymore," which Johnny Cash covered after he heard June Carter Cash sing it. Ritchie had written numerous songs about mining under the pseudonym "'Than Hall," to avoid troubling her non-political mother, and believing they might be better received if attributed to a man.

"Nottamun Town" (which Ritchie had learned from her uncle Jason and performed in 1954 on Kentucky Mountains Songs and in 1965 on A Time For Singin) was covered by Shirley Collins (1964), Bert Jansch (1966), and Fairport Convention (1969). Bob Dylan used the tune for his 1963 song "Masters of War" on the album The Freewheelin' Bob Dylan.

From her "uncle" Jason, Ritchie had learned to alter tunes and lyrics from verse to verse and performance to performance, viewing elements of improvisation and variation as a natural part of traditional music. Her versions of family songs and original compositions vary slightly between performances, and she often created new songs by using bits of material from existing ones or adding newly composed verses to flesh out song fragments she recalled from her childhood.

Her record None but One (1977), which won the 1977 critics' award in Rolling Stone, introduced her music to a younger audience and secured her place in mainstream folk music.

Her 50th anniversary album was Mountain Born (1995), which features her sons Peter and Jonathan.

Ritchie was the subject of the 1996 documentary Mountain Born: The Jean Ritchie Story, which was produced by Kentucky Educational Television.

== The dulcimer revival ==
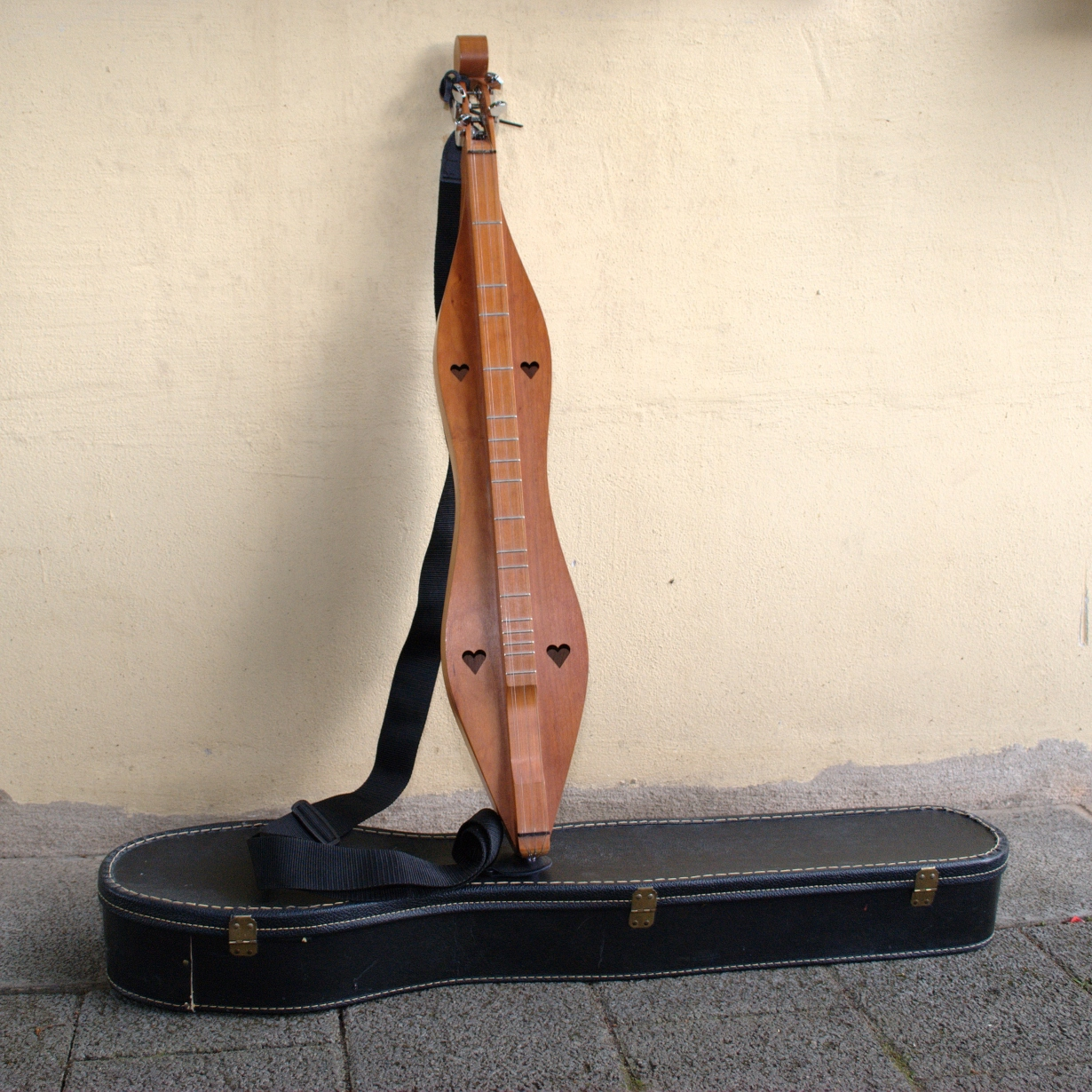
Appalachian dulcimer

Ritchie is credited with bringing national and international attention to the Appalachian dulcimer as the main initiator of the "dulcimer revival." Distinct from the hammer dulcimer, the Appalachian dulcimer (or "mountain dulcimer") is an intimate indoor instrument with a soft, ethereal sound, probably first played by Appalachian Scotch-Irish immigrants in the early half of the nineteenth century. The Ritchies strummed their dulcimers with a goose-feather quill.

Her father Balis (1869–1958) had played the Appalachian dulcimer but forbade his children to touch it. At age five or six, Ritchie defied this prohibition and covertly played the instrument. By the time Balis decided to teach her how to play, Jean was already accustomed to the instrument, so father labeled her as a "natural born musician". By 1949, Jean's dulcimer playing had become a hallmark of her style. After Jean's husband George Pickow made her one as a present, the couple decided there might be a potential market for them. Morris Pickow, Pickow's uncle, set up an instrument workshop for them under the Williamsburg Bridge in Brooklyn. At first, they were shipped to New York in an unfinished state by Ritchie's Kentucky relative, Jethro Amburgey, then back to the woodworking instructor at the Hindman Settlement School. George placed a finish and Jean tuned the dulcimers, and soon they had sold 300 dulcimers. Later, the couple manufactured the dulcimers from start to finish themselves.

Ritchie's use of the dulcimer and her tutorial, The Dulcimer Book (1974), inspired folk revival musicians both in the US and Britain to record songs using the instrument. Because fans kept asking her "Which album has the most dulcimer?", she finally recorded an album called The Most Dulcimer in 1984, which included the dulcimer on every song.

== Personal life and death ==
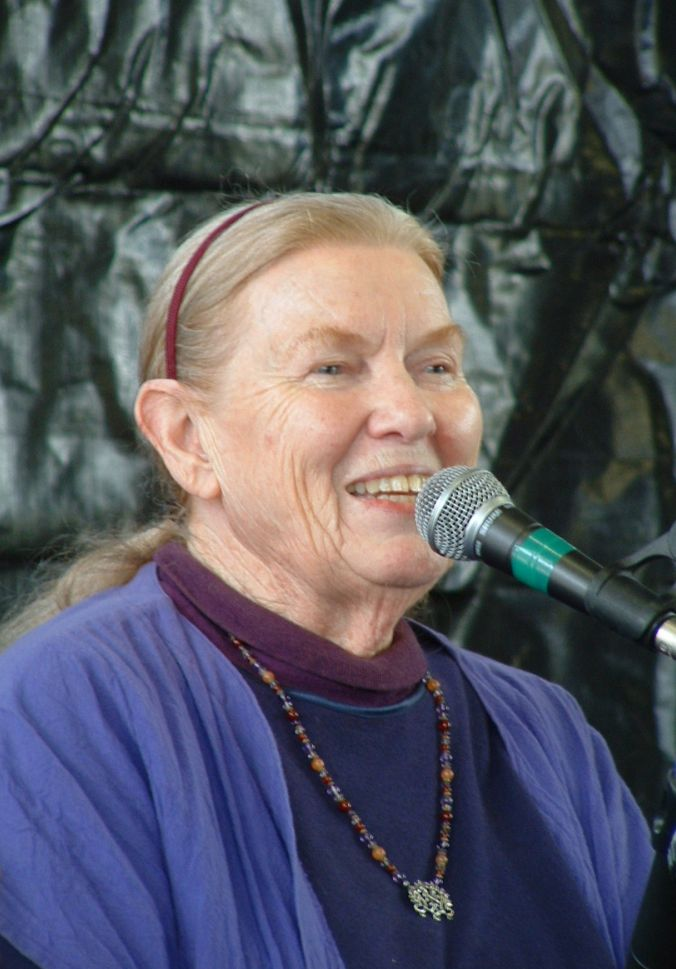
Ritchie in 2004

Ritchie was married to photographer George Pickow from 1950 until his death in 2010, with whom she had two sons, Peter (1954–) and Jonathan (1958–2020). She lived in Baxter Estates, New York, and was inducted into the Long Island Music Hall of Fame in 2008.

In early December 2009, Ritchie was hospitalized after suffering a stroke which impaired her ability to communicate. She recovered to some degree then returned to her home in Berea, Kentucky. A friend reported on her 90th birthday, "Jean has been living quietly in Berea for the last few years, in good spirits and well cared for by neighbors and family." She died at home in Berea on June 1, 2015, aged 92.

== Discography ==
- Singing the Traditional Songs of Her Kentucky Mountain Family (1952)
- Appalachian Folk Songs: Black-eyed Susie, Goin' to Boston, Lovin' Hanna (195–)
- Kentucky Mountains Songs (1954)
- Field Trip (1954)
- Courting Songs (1954) (with Oscar Brand)
- Shivaree (1955)
- Songs from Kentucky (1956)
- American Folk Tales and Songs (1956)
- Saturday Night and Sunday Too (1956)
- Children's Songs & Games from the Southern Mountains (1957)
- Singing Family of the Cumberlands (1957)
- Riddle Me This (1957) (with Oscar Brand)
- The Ritchie Family of Kentucky (1959)
- Carols of All Seasons (1959)
- Field Trip – England (1959)
- British Traditional Ballads in the Southern Mountains, Vol. 1 Folkways (1960) (Child ballads)
- British Traditional Ballads in the Southern Mountains, Vol. 2 Folkways FA 2302 (1960) (Child ballads)
- As I Roved Out (Field Trip-Ireland) (1960)
- Ballads from Her Appalachian Family Tradition (1961)
- Precious Memories (1962)
- Jean Ritchie and Doc Watson Live at Folk City (1963)
- The Appalachian Dulcimer: An Instructional Record (1964)
- A Time For Singing (1965)
- Marching Across the Green Grass & Other American Children's Game Songs (1968)
- Clear Waters Remembered (1974) Geordie 101
- Jean Ritchie At Home (1974) Pacific Cascade Records LPL 7026
- None But One (1977)
- High Hills and Mountains (1979)
- Sweet Rivers (1981) June Appal JA 037 (hymns)
- Christmas Revels. Wassail! Wassail! (1982)
- The Most Dulcimer (1984)
- O Love Is Teasin' (1985)
- Kentucky Christmas, Old and New (1987)
- Childhood Songs (1991)
- Mountain Born (1995)
- Legends of Old Time Music (2002, DVD)
- Ballads (2003; vol. 1 and 2 above, issued on a single CD)
- Dear Jean: Artists Celebrate Jean Ritchie (2014, tribute album)

== Published works ==
- Ritchie, Jean (1955). Singing Family of the Cumberlands. Illustrated by Maurice Sendak. New York: Oxford University Press. ISBN 978-0-8131-0186-6. LCCN 55005554.
- Ritchie, Jean (1963). The Dulcimer Book; Being a Book about the Three-stringed Appalachian Dulcimer, Including Some Ways of Tuning and Playing; Some Recollections in its Local History in Perry and Knott Counties, Kentucky. New York: Oak Music. LCCN 63020754.
- Ritchie, Jean (1965). Apple Seeds and Soda Straws. illustrated by Don Bolognese. New York: H.Z. Walck. LCCN 65013223.
- Ritchie, Jean (1965/1997) Folk Songs of the Southern Appalachians ISBN 978-0-8131-0927-5. The original 1965 edition was issued by Oak Publications, the 1997 expanded version by University Press of Kentucky. The task of transcribing Ritchie's sung music into musical notation was carried out (1965) by Melinda Zacuto and Jerry Silverman.
- Jean Ritchie's Swapping Song Book ISBN 978-0-8131-0973-2
- Jean Ritchie's Dulcimer People (1975)
- Ritchie, Jean, ed. (1953). A Garland of Mountain Song; Songs from the Repertoire of the Ritchie family of Viper, Kentucky (New ed.). New York: Broadcast Music. LCCN m53001732.
- Ritchie, Jean (1971). Celebration of Life: Her songs, Her poems. Port Washington: Geordie Music Publishing. ISBN 0-8256-9676-3.
- Ritchie, Jean; Brumfield, Susan (2015). Jean Ritchie's Kentucky Mother Goose: Songs and Stories from My Childhood. Milwaukee, WI: Hal Leonard Books. ISBN 978-1-4950-0788-0.

== Awards and honors ==
- Rolling Stone Critics Award in (1977) for her album None But One
- Folk Alliance's Lifetime Achievement (1998)
- National Heritage Fellowship (2002) awarded by the National Endowment for the Arts, the highest honor for folk and traditional arts in the United States

== See also ==
- List of the Child Ballads
