= A Maid of Constant Sorrow =

Studio album by Judy Collins
- Released: November 1961
- Recorded: 1961
- Genre: Folk
- Length: 35:26
- Label: Elektra
- Producer: Jac Holzman

Judy Collins chronology
A Maid of Constant Sorrow (1961)	The Golden Apples of the Sun (1962)

Professional ratings
Review scores
Source	Rating
AllMusic	3/5 stars
Billboard	4/5 stars
The Encyclopedia of Popular Music	3/5 stars
The Rolling Stone Album Guide	3/5 stars

A Maid of Constant Sorrow is the debut album by American singer and songwriter Judy Collins, released in 1961 on Elektra Records and featuring traditional folk songs.

== Content and style ==
On the album Collins' voice and guitar are sparsely accompanied by Fred Hellerman on second guitar and Erik Darling on banjo. The title song is a variant of "Man of Constant Sorrow". The selections range from the Scottish anthem "Wild Mountain Thyme" to the Irish standards "Bold Fenian Men" and "The Prickilie Bush". The album also includes more obscure numbers, such as "Tim Evans", "Wars of Germany" and "John Riley".

These songs are in the style of social protest, similar to early recordings by Bob Dylan. They reveal a style from Collins different than her later, better-known releases. In "Tim Evans", written by Ewan MacColl (Grammy award-winning writer in 1972 of "The First Time Ever I Saw Your Face"), she sings about Timothy Evans who was wrongfully convicted and hanged in Britain in 1950 for the killing of his wife and daughter ("Go down, you murderer, go down"), whose exoneration comes only after having been hanged. Her alto vocals on lively songs like "O Daddy Be Gay" contrast with the social message material.

In 2001, Elektra re-released the album on CD with Collins' second album, Golden Apples of the Sun (1962).

== Track listing ==
All songs traditional, arranged by Judy Collins, except where otherwise noted.

Side one

1. "Maid of Constant Sorrow" – 2:35
2. "The Prickilie Bush" – 3:25
3. "Wild Mountain Thyme" (Frank McPeake) – 2:30
4. "Tim Evans" (Ewan MacColl) – 2:51
5. "Sailor's Life" – 2:41
6. "Bold Fenian Men" – 2:44

Side two

1. "Wars of Germany" – 3:10
2. "O Daddy Be Gay" – 2:34
3. "I Know Where I'm Going" (Herbert Hughes) – 1:50
4. "John Riley" – 3:30
5. "Pretty Saro" – 3:03
6. "The Rising of the Moon" – 4:07

== Personnel ==
- Judy Collins – guitar, vocals

Additional musicians

- Fred Hellerman – second guitar
- Erik Darling – banjo

Technical

- Jac Holzman – production supervisor
- Mark Abramson – editing
- William S. Harvey – cover design
- Lida Moser – cover photo
