= The Wind and Rain =

The Wind and Rain may refer to:

- The Two Sisters (folk song), a murder ballad about one sister killing the other one, some versions are known under the name “The Wind and Rain”
- Feste's Song, a song from the Shakespeare's comedy “Twelfth Night”, widely published under the name “Hey, Ho, the Wind and the Rain” or just “The Wind and the Rain”.
