= Goyo =

Goyo may refer to:

- Goyo, a character from Tom Clancy's Rainbow six siege

== People ==
- Goyo (singer), member of Colombian hip hop group ChocQuibTown
- Goyo Benito (b. 1946), Spanish footballer
- Goyo Blasco (1909–1983), Spanish footballer
- Goyo Fonseca (b. 1965), Spanish footballer
- Goyō Hashiguchi (1880–1921), Japanese artist
- Goyo Jiménez (b. 1970), Spanish comedian
- Goyo Manzano (b. 1956), Spanish football manager
- Goyo Montero (b. 1975), Spanish ballet dancer
- Goyo Vargas (b. 1970), Mexican boxer
- Dakota Goyo (b. 1999), Canadian actor
- Gregorio Conrado Álvarez "El Goyo" (1925–2016), Uruguayan army general
- Gregorio Cárdenas Hernández "Goyo" (1915–1999), Mexican serial killer
- Gregorio Díaz Alfonso "Goyo" (1929–1996), Cuban rumba musician, co-founder of Los Muñequitos de Matanzas
- Gregorio Hernández Ríos "El Goyo" (1936–2012), Cuban rumba musician
- Gregorio Jiménez de la Cruz "Goyo" (1972–2014), Mexican journalist
- Gregorio Sauceda-Gamboa "El Goyo" (b. 1965), Mexican drug trafficker
- Gregory “Goyo” Fernando Pappas (b. 1960), American philosopher

== Media ==
- Goyo: The Boy General, 2018 Philippine historical epic film
- Goyo (2024 film), 2024 Argentine romantic drama film

== Other uses ==
- Don Goyo, also known as Popocatépetl, volcano in Mexico
- Goyo FC, Mongolian football club

== See also ==
- Gollo people
