= Without Mercy =

Without Mercy may refer to:

- Without Mercy (film), American silent melodrama directed in 1925 by George Melford
- Without Mercy (album), 1984 release by English band The Durutti Column
- Without Mercy (Omnia album), 2000 release, under its Latin title Sine Missione, by Dutch band Omnia
