= The L&N Don't Stop Here Anymore =

Jean Ritchie song

Song by Jean Ritchie
- Released: 1965
- Genre: Ballad

"The L&N Don't Stop Here Anymore" is a ballad written and released by Jean Ritchie in 1965.

Though Jean Ritchie typically eschewed controversial topics, the subject of impoverishing coal miners was touchy enough for the musician that she originally released "L&N" in 1965 under her maternal grandfather's name, Than Hall. Ritchie grew up in Viper, Kentucky's Slabtown Holler, and a Louisville and Nashville Railroad passenger train ran right by the mouth of the hollow. Difficult times began when the local coal mines closed and the trains stopped coming; "The L&N Don't Stop Here Anymore" reflects that time. In 2008, Ritchie still owned the family farm in Viper and fought against mountaintop removal mining, a form of surface mining she called "a sin".

Michelle Shocked and Kathy Mattea covered the song, but it was made famous by Johnny Cash, who published his own cover of the ballad after hearing June Carter Cash sing it.
