= Kurt Severin =

American photographer, journalist and adventurer

Kurt Severin (July 31, 1902 – March 1984) was a German-born American photographer, journalist, and adventurer active from the 1930s to 1970s.

== Early life ==
Kurt Severin was born in 1902 in Hanover, Germany. While still in school he took up photography as a hobby. Instead of fulfilling his parents' wishes that he become a painter, he left school early to start a career as a typewriter salesman. He did not get into photography until 1927 when he was in Central America as a special correspondent for the Berliner Illustrirte Zeitung.

Severin's photographs were at first distributed by the Three Lions agency and then by Black Star, on which LIFE magazine depended for a large part of the approximately 200 photographs selected for publication each week which could not be supplied by the mere ten staff photographers it was employing at its peak in the 1950s. Bertram D. Wolfe in the New York Times of November 12, 1944, described him as "a photographer who first won a professional reputation by managing to click a camera just as a bullfighter got his pants torn off by a bull. Aided by this happy incident, he wandered as free-lance photographer for fifteen years through the cities, plains, jungles and mountains of Latin America." Rotary magazine in 1958 also profiled him; "Kurt Severin, photographer…, paints, writes, and travels widely, especially in Central and South America. He lives in Miami, Florida, a good departure point for trips southward."

His output was exhaustive and his travels from his base in Florida covered South and Central American countries Peru, Bolivia, Colombia, Brazil, Venezuela, Guatemala, Mexico, Paraguay, Uruguay, Costa Rica, Panama and the Caribbean, and he also produced stories in New Guinea and other Pacific islands, and in Russia.

== A prodigious photojournalist ==
Severin was wide-ranging and adaptable, photographing subjects in combat and in jungle settings, but also comfortable covering stories on the elite students and staff of Harvard Law School and the 'coming out' of a cotton magnate's daughter An inveterate adventurer, he professed that "I don't know fear. It is one thing I am not acquainted with."'

He photographed the coffee port of Santos in Brazil in 1930; the Chaco War 1932-35, showing combat with light Swiss and Czechoslavakian-made weapons, and Bolivian men leaving their home town by farm truck after being drafted in to their national army for combat against Paraguay; 'coca-chewing Andean Indians'; the 'Auslandsdeutsche' of Tovar a Baden village in Venezuela (1934); extraction of rubber in Guatemala 1935 and its transport by Chicleros of the rainforest of northern Guatemala over the Lago Peten Itza to Flores where the gum was processed; a locust plague in Uruguay 1936; a feature on Ralph Cook Craig, winner of the sprint double at the 1912 Summer Olympics, in his office in Albany, for Berliner Illustrirte Zeitung's special edition on the Olympics (1936); the river port of Barranquilla at the Rio Magdalena (1938); and on piranhas (1937).

== 1940s ==
Severin's stories ranged from the comic to the tragic. In 1942 his humorous series showing chimpanzees sharing a milk bottle appeared in LOOK, then in 1945 Severin photographed popular playwright and author Stefan Zweig, who had lived in Petrópolis near Rio de Janeiro since 1940, on a bus and on the steps of the New York Public Library Main Branch, only months before Zweig and his young wife poisoned themselves February 23, 1942.

Other stories covered Marajó Island in Brazil and its cowboys; Peruvian workers demonstrating how the ancient Incas polished the large surfaces of their stone buildings, by hauling a rough boulder back and forth across the rock face; Panama (1945) and another feature on the "Architecture of the Prehistoric Civilization of the Andes in South America" with details of masonry; and a matador getting dressed with the help of an assistant (1945).

== 1950s ==
In the 1950s Severin illustrated, and also often wrote, general interest and travel stories and on ethnographic and political subjects; on Pan American Grace Airways aircraft; the rarely witnessed puberty ceremony for a San Bias girl of the Cuna Indians; children 'rescued from Castro' by a Catholic welfare organisation at a refugee camp south of Miami waiting for resettlement in other cities; workers in Curaçao making hats, one of the island's main trades; a New Orleans marching band playing in the street during a carnival pageant in Louisiana; Costa Rican churchgoers; the city of Arequipa in southern Peru; Naomi, the dancer at 'The Silver Slippers' club in Cuba; tourists queueing in Moscow's Red Square to enter the Mausoleum of Vladimir Ilich Lenin; marimba making in Guatemala and traditional leather-tooled men's money bags in made in Colombia that were being adopted by American women; and water pots in Colombia.

A curious and enthusiastic amateur zoologist, in 1957 Severin precipitated the myth that cheetahs could reach 70 mph when he conducted a basic experiment using an upturned bicycle and some fishing line to pull along a meat-scented bag, clocking how long it took a cheetah to run 73-metre course. His results – showing cheetahs reaching speeds of 70 miles per hour - were soon accepted as scientific fact and only debunked in the 1970s.

In 1955 Edward Steichen selected his picture of Colombian dancers for the section 'Dance' in the world-touring Museum of Modern Art exhibition The Family of Man that was seen by 9 million visitors.

== 1960s to 1970s ==
In the 1960s Severin portrayed Mercury astronaut Alan Shepard in the NASA Control Room and other launch activities in July 1961; documented the civil rights demonstrations with American singer Harry Belafonte addressing crowds at the Lincoln Memorial during the March on Washington, 1963; and photographed couples dancing the rhumba in a club in Cuba. In 1972 he was in New Guinea to record the Asaro 'Mud Men' for Australia's Walkabout magazine.

== Publications ==
Publications to which Severin contributed pictures and writing, from the 1930s to the 1970s, ranged from the popular to the learned and included: LIFE, LOOK, the Foreign Service Journal, the Rotarian, Natural History:The Magazine of the American Museum of Natural History, The Pacific Spectator (published for the Pacific Coast Committee for the Humanities of the American Council of Learned Societies by Stanford University Press), Travel, Americas, National Geographic, Etnologiska Studier, The Inter-American, McLeans, The Pan American, Popular Photography, Minicam Photography, Lotería, Revista Brasileira De Geografia, Anuario De Estudios Americanos, Walkabout.

He co-authored Severin, Kurt; Sorsby, Lenore (1944), To the South (1st ed.), Eagle Books, distributed by Duell, Sloan and Pearce

Severin contributed photographs to numbers of books, for example Carr, Archie (1957), The windward road : adventures of a naturalist on remote Caribbean shores, Hale.

Many of Severin's photographs are now distributed by Getty Images.

He features as a character in Berlin in the 1920s in the historical comic book Berlin by Jason Lutes.
