= Stenny =

Stenny may refer to:

- Stenhousemuir, a town in Scotland
- Steve and Jenny of the Dutch pagan folk band Omnia
