= Head Above Water =

Head Above Water may refer to:

- Head Above Water (album), by Avril Lavigne, 2019
  - "Head Above Water" (song), from the above album, 2018
- "Head Above Water", a 2012 song by Men Without Hats from Love in the Age of War
- "Head Above Water", a 2025 song by Twocolors and Safri Duo
- Head Above Water (film), directed by Jim Wilson and released in 1996
- Head Above Water (book), autobiography by Buchi Emecheta

== See also ==
- Head Above the Water, a Brigid Mae Power album
