= The Two Worlds =

Studio album by Brigid Mae Power
- Released: 9 February 2018
- Studio: Analogue Catalogue, County Down, Ireland; The Half Dome
- Genre: Irish folk music
- Language: English
- Label: Tompkins Square

Brigid Mae Power chronology
The Ones You Keep Close (2017)	The Two Worlds (2018)	Head Above the Water (2020)

The Two Worlds is a 2018 studio album by Irish folk musician Brigid Mae Power. The album has received positive reviews from critics.

== Reception ==
Professional ratings
Aggregate scores
Source	Rating
AnyDecentMusic?	7.2/10 (6 reviews)
Metacritic	82/100 (6 reviews)
Review scores
Source	Rating
The Guardian	4/5 stars
The Irish Times	3/5 stars
The Line of Best Fit	8/10
Pitchfork	7.4/10
Record Collector	4/5 stars
Sputnikmusic	4.0/5
Uncut	4/5 stars

Editors at AnyDecentMusic? rated this album a 7.2 out of 10, based on six reviews. Brigid Mae Power received positive reviews from critics noted at review aggregator Metacritic. It has a weighted average score of 82 out of 100, based on six reviews.

In The Guardian, Laura Snapes rated this release 4 out of 5 stars, characterizing the music as "steely songs about abuse and recovery" and calling it "less oblique" than 2016's self-titled album. Dustin Van Nguyen of The Irish Times gave this album 3 out of 5 stars, writing that it "encapsulates a romantic vision of rustic, pastoral terrain" and that few musicians "can maintain either the chilly sense of isolation or epic sweep of Power's best numbers". Janne Oinonen of The Line of Best Fit gave The Two Worlds 8 out of 10, stating that Peter Broderick "squeezes maximum atmospherics out of a sparse sonic palette and the unadorned melodies that carry Power's clear-eyed observations about the world around her and inside her". Mother Jones' Jon Young favorably reviewed this release, ending that it "sticks with you long after it’s over".

Sam Sodomsky rated this album 7.4 out of 10 for Pitchfork, calling it "a dizzyingly isolated album, music that gains momentum as it burrows deeper". Record Collector's Mike Goldsmith gave The Two Worlds 4 out of 5 stars, calling it "so much better" than Powers' debut full-length, writing that it is "emotional and feminine, but now so much tougher and dark as hell". Atari of Sputnikmusic calls this release "completely intimate" and "conjured up from the musician’s most isolated, profound moments". Writing for Uncut, Michael Bonner gave The Two Worlds 4 out of 5 stars, praising Powers' ability to balance the personal and political, stating that "the two worlds co-exist beautifully here, the soft Power and the raw".

== Track listing ==
All songs written by Brigid Mae Power.

1. "I’m Grateful" – 4:33
2. "Don’t Shut Me Up (Politely)" – 5:20
3. "So You’ve Seen My Limit" – 3:48
4. "On My Own with You" – 3:45
5. "Is My Presence in the Room Enough for You?" – 4:20
6. "Down on the Ground" – 3:53
7. "Peace Backing Us Up" – 3:53
8. "How’s Your New Home?" – 4:55
9. "The Two Worlds" – 4:08
10. "Let Me Go Now" – 4:31

== Personnel ==
- Brigid Mae Power – instrumentation, vocals, artwork
- Peter Broderick – instrumentation, recording, mixing, mastering at The Sparkle, Woods, Oregon, United States
- Julie Mclarnon – recording

== See also ==
- List of 2018 albums
