= None but One =

- Original 1977 release

Studio album by Jean Ritchie
- Released: 1977
- Studio: Ultima Studios, Blauvelt, New York
- Genre: folk music / folk rock
- Label: Sire Records
- Producer: Al Steckler, Ron Frangipane

Jean Ritchie chronology
Jean Ritchie At Home (1974)	None but One (1977)	Christmas Revels. Wassail! Wassail! (1982)

None but One is a studio album released by American singer Jean Ritchie in 1977 on Sire LP record SA-7530. The album was a stylistic departure for Ritchie in that it featured "modern" instruments and production values. It resulted in significant critical acclaim, but the album suffered serious distribution problems. A song from the album, "Now is the Cool of the Day" became an anthem for environmentalists opposed to mountaintop removal.

== Background ==
Jean Ritchie stated that her goal was to record folk music the way that she heard it, with no regard to broadcast sensibilities. However, her husband George Pickow suggested that she create an album with airplay in mind, in order to familiarize a larger section of the public with Ritchie's work.

== The recording ==
Recording took place at Ultima Studios in Blauvelt, New York, with production by Al Steckler and Ron Frangipane. The album differed from Richie's usual output in that electric instruments were used alongside traditional acoustic Appalachian instruments, and featured a higher degree of production work than usual. The recording includes backing vocals by several folk musicians Ritchie considered friends who were well-known and her sons Jon and Peter Pickow.

The title track, inspired by a traditional celebration held in Lincolnshire, is a song promoting racial harmony. The final track is an environmental hymn, soon included in the Quaker hymnal, which would go on to become an identifying anthem of the movement to halt Mountaintop removal mining. Ritchie allowed the song's use by Kentuckians for the Commonwealth in support of their activities in opposition to mountaintop removal. She would perform this song in 2007 at Concert for the Mountains, held in New York City in conjunction with the United Nations Conference on Environmental Sustainability. Many of the other tracks are also social commentaries.

== Release, reception and legacy ==
Ritche was concerned about reception of a "new sound", but None but One became Ritchie's most critically acclaimed album, and is her most widely recognized. It was given the highest award for folk music from both Rolling Stone (1977) and Melody Maker (1980). Rolling Stone called it "as plain and anciently beautiful as any mountain music ever recorded." The high-profile positive reception was a surprise to Ritchie, and she noted that what was "new" to her was referred to as "ancient" by Rolling Stone. An Arizona Republic review stated that while previous recordings by Ritchie were educational in nature regarding Appalachian music or the dulcimer, this album was "pure listening pleasure", and noted the breadth of the album stylistically, ranging from a cappella singing to rock accompaniment while remaining true to "old mountain timbre and tonality." Lynn Short of the Morristown Daily Record thought the disc fit well with Ritchie's previous output, considering the Ritchie compositions to be indistinguishable from traditional material. She names "Fair Nottamun Town" and "Sweet Sorrow in the Wind" as the strongest tracks, and while calling them "difficult to criticize" singles out "The Riddle Song" and "Flowers of Joy" to be weaker efforts.

Initial reaction was positive, and the album saw strong sales in folk-music venues and indeed received the planned-for airplay. Although acclaimed, the album's sales were severely curtailed because of distribution problems resulting from Sire's switch from ABC Records to Warner Brothers Records as their distributor, which caused Sire to cease promoting the album. Frustrated by these distribution problems, Ritchie and her husband decided to form their own record label, Greenhays Recordings, "out of self-defense."

== Track listing ==
No.	Title	Length
1.	"Fair Nottamun Town" (Jean Ritchie)	2:52
2.	"Too Many Shadows" (Jean Ritchie)	3:16
3.	"Black Waters" (Jean Ritchie)	4:07
4.	"None but One" (Jean Ritchie)	6:25
5.	"The Orphan's Lament" (public domain arr. Jean Ritchie)	2:52
6.	"Flowers of Joy" (Jean Ritchie)	3:38
7.	"See That Rainbow Shine" (Jean Ritchie)	3:18
8.	"The Riddle Song" (public domain arr. Peter Pickow)	3:00
9.	"Sweet Sorrow in the Wind" (Jean Ritchie)	3:52
10.	"Wondrous Love" (public domain arr. Jean Ritchie)	2:22
11.	"Now Is the Cool of the Day" (Jean Ritchie)	2:26

== Personnel ==
- Claire Bey - vocal: "The Orphan's Lament"
- Oscar Brand - vocal: "The Riddle Song"
- Charlie Brown III - electric guitar
- Richard Crooks - drums
- John Crowder - electric bass
- Jeff Davis - background vocals "Now Is the Cool of the Day"
- Sal Di Troia - acoustic guitar
- Ron Frangipane - piano, organ
- Howard Gordon - drums: "The Riddle Song"
- Brook Hedick - background vocals "Now Is the Cool of the Day"
- Janis Ian - background vocals: "Black Waters", "The Orphan's Lament"
- Cecilia Kirtland - background vocals "Now Is the Cool of the Day"
- Ken Kosek - fiddle
- Jon Pickow - banjo, dulcimer - background vocals: "Flowers of Joy", "Now Is the Cool of the Day"
- Peter Pickow - dulcimer, recorders, autoharp, dobro - background vocals: "Now Is the Cool of the Day", "Too Many Shadows"
- David Pitt - background vocals "Now Is the Cool of the Day"
- Patty Platzman - background vocals "Now Is the Cool of the Day"
- Susan Reed: background vocals: “Wondrous Love"
- Pamela Schall - cello - background vocals "Now Is the Cool of the Day"
- Mary Travers - background vocals: "Flowers of Joy"
- Eric Weissberg - mandolin, pedal steel
