= Singing the Traditional Songs of Her Kentucky Mountain Family =

1952 studio album by Jean Ritchie

Singing the Traditional Songs of Her Kentucky Mountain Family is the first studio album of American folk singer Jean Ritchie. It was released in 1952 by Elektra Records. The album consists of renditions of traditional Appalachian folk songs, some of which are performed a cappella.

== Track listing ==
- O Love is Teasin'
- Jubilee
- Black is The Color
- A Short Life of Trouble
- One Morning in May
- One Morning in May (Version 2)
- Old Virginny
- Skin and Bones
- The Little Devils
- My Boy Willie
- Hush Little Baby
- Gypsum Davy
- The Cuckoo
- The Cuckoo (Version 2)
- Little Cory
- Keep Your Garden Clean

== Background ==
Elektra Records producer Mitch Miller first became aware of Ritchie through her performances in Greenwich Village in the late 1940s and early 50s. Shortly before she signed with Elektra, Ritchie made recordings for Alan Lomax.

The album cover was designed by George Pickow, Ritchie's husband.
