= Three Lions Inc. =

American photo agency founded in 1937

Three Lions Inc. was an American photo agency founded in 1937 by its president Max Georg Löwenherz (May 28, 1909 – September 13, 2003), and which by the 1980s held offices in Fifth Avenue, then at East 32nd St. New York. It also operated a London outlet.

== Founding ==
Son of German Jews David and Clara Löwenherz, Löwenherz created the business name as a play on his own, which means 'lion-heart' in German, and in honour of three brothers; himself, Heinz and Walter, who were the sons of the Coburg businessman. In 1933 Max was one of few who were released from mass arrests of Coburg Jews by the Nazis, and he fled with brother Walter to join Heinz in a picture agency in Amsterdam. Max set up a similar business after migrating to Manhattan in 1937, and was later joined by Walter. After the Nazi takeover of the Netherlands, Heinz and his family were transported to Germany where they were killed in the Holocaust. Löwenherz became a donor-member of The Warburg Society.

Max Löwenherz also made a notable collection of letters and autographs, Lion Heart Autographs, an interest inherited by his son David (b.1951)

== Photographers ==
The agency commissioned international photographers, including Kurt Severin, Stefan Lorant, Orlando Suero and George Pickow, marketing their illustrations and photojournalism for books, calendars, advertisements and magazine, newspaper articles and covers for diverse recording companies, ranging from Tops and Crown to Atlantic and RCA, under the slogan "our cover pictures are known everywhere'.

== Subjects ==
Celebrities portrayed for the agency include John F. Kennedy, actors Brigitte Bardot, Sharon Tate, Diana Ross, Julie Andrews, Paul Newman, Robert Redford, Steve McQueen, Jack Nicholson, musicians Louis Armstrong, Little Richard, Theodore Bikel, Pete Seeger, Judy Collins and Lee Marvin, artists Eugen Spiro whose portrait of Löwenherz is in the Leo Baeck Institute, Ivan Meštrović, Edward Hopper, and model Pamela Green.

== Closure ==
The agency was sold in 1983 and Löwenherz donated 600 of the company's archive of Kennedy photographs and negatives, most taken by Suero in May 1954, to the Peabody Institute of Johns Hopkins University.
