= Golden Apples of the Sun (album) =

Studio album by Judy Collins
- Released: July 1962
- Genre: Folk
- Length: 37:54
- Label: Elektra
- Producer: Jac Holzman

Judy Collins chronology
A Maid of Constant Sorrow (1961)	Golden Apples of the Sun (1962)	Judy Collins #3 (1963)

Professional ratings
Review scores
Source	Rating
AllMusic	3/5 stars
The Encyclopedia of Popular Music	4/5 stars
The Rolling Stone Album Guide	3/5 stars

Golden Apples of the Sun is the second studio album by American singer and songwriter Judy Collins, released by Elektra Records in 1962.

In 2001, Elektra re-released the album on CD with Collins' first album, A Maid of Constant Sorrow (1961).

== Critical reception ==
In retrospective reviews, Bruce Eder of AllMusic wrote that Collins "generates a much more attractive sound and body of work, with a freer, less rigid approach that gives the songs a chance to breathe and flow." Richard Harrington of The Washington Post called the title track "brilliant", writing that the album presents Collins "in her traditional folksinger stage, reinvigorating folk standards."

== Track listing ==
All songs traditional, arranged by Judy Collins, unless otherwise noted.

Side one

1. "Golden Apples of the Sun" (lyrics by William Butler Yeats, from the poem "The Song of Wandering Aengus"; music by Judy Collins) – 3:55
2. "Bonnie Ship the Diamond" – 2:19
3. "Little Brown Dog" – 3:12
4. "Twelve Gates to the City" – 3:17
5. "Christ Child Lullaby" – 2:55
6. "Great Selchie of Shule Skerry" – 5:03

Side two

1. "Tell Me Who I'll Marry" – 3:46
2. "Fannerio" – 3:05
3. "Crow on the Cradle" (Sydney Carter) – 3:25
4. "Lark in the Morning" – 0:56
5. "Sing Hallelujah" (Mike Settle) – 2:39
6. "Shule Aroon" – 3:17

== Personnel ==
- Judy Collins – guitar, keyboards, vocals

Additional musicians

- Walter Raim – second guitar
- Bill Lee – bass

Technical

- Jac Holzman – production supervisor
- Mark Abramson – engineer
- William S. Harvey – cover design
- George Pickow – cover photo
- Peter J. Welding – liner notes
