= Brigid Mae Power (album) =

Studio album by Brigid Mae Power
- Released: 10 June 2016
- Studio: The Sparkle, Woods, Oregon, United States
- Genre: Irish folk music
- Language: English
- Label: Tompkins Square

Brigid Mae Power chronology
I Told You the Truth (2014)	Brigid Mae Power (2016)	The Ones You Keep Close (2017)

Brigid Mae Power is a 2016 studio album by Irish folk musician Brigid Mae Power. It has received positive reviews from critics.

== Reception ==
Professional ratings
Aggregate scores
Source	Rating
AnyDecentMusic?	7.4/10 (5 reviews)
Metacritic	85/100 (5 reviews)
Review scores
Source	Rating
The Irish Times	4/5 stars
The Observer	4/5 stars
Pitchfork	7.5/10

Editors at AnyDecentMusic? rated this album a 7.4 out of 10, based on five reviews. Brigid Mae Power received positive reviews from critics noted at review aggregator Metacritic. It has a weighted average score of 85 out of 100, based on five reviews.

Writing for The Irish Times, Joe Breen rated this album 4 out of 5 stars, writing that "working with Oregon-based performer Peter Broderick has liberated her, she said, and this sparse, spectral collection is the evidence". Kitty Empire also gave a 4-star review for The Observer, writing that this album is "so full of feeling" and notes the powerful emotions in Power's lyrics. Pitchfork's Laura Snapes called this album "a liminal space made up of droning guitars, metallic piano reverberations, and lyrics that trace some barely escaped threat" with "clear seriousness" and a "sense of newfound freedom".

== Track listing ==
All songs written by Brigid Mae Power.

1. "It’s Clearing Now" – 7:40
2. "Sometimes" – 5:07
3. "Let Me Hold You Through This" – 3:31
4. "Is It My Low or Yours" – 3:45
5. "Lookin' at You in a Photo" – 4:31
6. "I Left Myself for a While" – 5:10
7. "Watching the Horses" – 5:06
8. "How You Feel" – 4:27

== Personnel ==
- Brigid Mae Power – instrumentation, vocals, cover painting
- Peter Broderick – instrumentation, recording, mixing, mastering
- Cory Gray – recording for piano and vocals on "Sometimes", "I Left Myself for a While", and "How You Feel"

== See also ==
- List of 2016 albums
