= Artus Moser =

Artus Moser (September 14,1894 – December 23,1992) was born in Hickory, North Carolina. He was an American folklorist, educator and musician who collected hundreds of folk songs in his native Western North Carolina and the Appalachian Mountains.

Moser grew up in Swannanoa. In 1917 Moser Graduated from Biltmore High school before serving a year in France during the First World War. He then completed undergraduate and master's degrees at the University of North Carolina at Chapel Hill, before studying at various other institutions.

Moser became a professor of social sciences at Asheville-Biltmore College in 1943.

In 1945, Moser contributed his archive to the Library of Congress, which in return loaned him a portable disc recorder and encouraged him to expand his collection. He made recordings of many traditional musicians including Jean Ritchie, Bascom Lamar Lunsford, Samantha Bumgarner and Virgil Sturgill.

He also sang songs for other folk music collectors such as Kenneth Goldstein, and recorded two albums with Folkway Records entitled North Carolina Ballads (1955) and North Carolina Mountain Folksongs and Ballads (1974). The Artus Moser archive contains his recordings, plus non-musical resources such as photographs, videos and stories.

Moser collected folk songs throughout the rest of his life, and died on Christmas Eve 1992 at the age of 98.
