= Dream from the Deep Well =

Studio album by Brigid Mae Power
- Released: 30 June 2023
- Studio: Green Door Studio, Glasgow, Scotland, United Kingdom
- Genre: Irish folk music
- Length: 47:44
- Language: English
- Label: Fire

Brigid Mae Power chronology
| Burning Your Light (2021) | Dream from the Deep Well (2023) |

Dream from the Deep Well is the fourth studio album by Irish folk musician Brigid Mae Power.

== Reception ==
Professional ratings
Review scores
| Source | Rating |
|---|---|
| AllMusic | 3.5/5 stars |
| The Arts Desk | 3/5 stars |
| Hot Press | 8/10 |
| The Irish Times | 4/5 stars |
| musicOMH | 3/5 stars |
| Uncut | 4/5 stars |
| Under the Radar | 7/10 |

Editors at AllMusic rated this album 3.5 out of 5 stars, with critic Marcy Donelson writing this album "is remarkably timeless-feeling as well as soft-spoken". Writing for The Arts Desk, Kieron Taylor gave Dream from the Deep Well 3 out of 5 stars, writing that Powers' music is more direct on this release than previous albums. Writing for Hot Press Lucy O'Toole rated this album an 8 out of 10, calling it "an album that directly faces up to our current times, while also recognising the ongoing influence of the past". Siobhán Kane of The Irish Times writes that tracks have "spindly eeriness" and are "gorgeously discomfiting" that is "vital, intelligent and dreamy music"; she gave the album 4 out of 5 stars. At musicOMH, Steven Johnson gave Dream from the Deep Well 3 out of 5 stars, summing up that it is "a heavy, lugubrious listen in places but is also the sound of an artist pursuing their art with integrity and investing themselves fully, showing that, while adversity can at times feel all encompassing, there are ways to overcome and find resolution". Sharon O'Connell of Uncut rated this album 4 out of 5 stars, calling this Power's "most resolute set yet". In Under the Radar, Irina Shtreis gave this release a 7 out of 10, calling it "a response to the times when it was created" that neither tries to sugarcoat or escape reality. Uncut editor Michael Bonner included this album on his list of the best of the year.

== Track listing ==
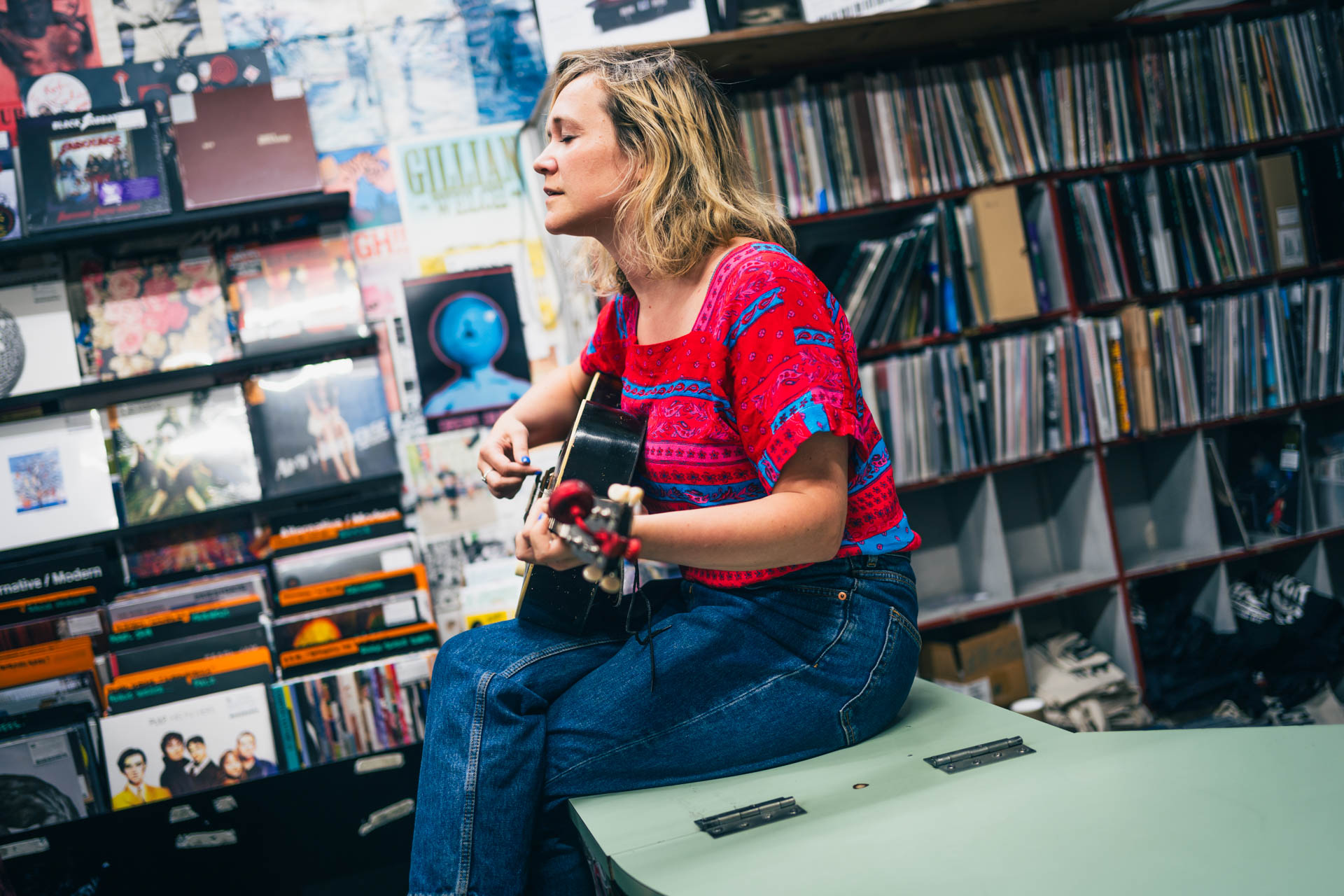
Brigid Mae Power at Rough Trade West in 2023

All songs written by Brigid Mae Power, except where noted.

1. "I Know Who Is Sick" (traditional) – 2:02
2. "Counting Down" – 4:03
3. "Maybe It's Just Lightning" – 4:09
4. "I Must Have Been Blind" (Tim Buckley) – 4:50
5. "The Waterford Song" – 4:28
6. "Ashling" – 3:22
7. "I'll Wait Outside for You" – 6:44
8. "Dream from the Deep Well" – 3:28
9. "I Don't Know Your Story" – 4:00
10. "Some Life You've Known" – 6:27
11. "Down by the Glenside" (traditional) – 4:06

== See also ==
- List of 2023 albums
