= Inter-American Journal of Philosophy =

- Discipline: Philosophy
- Language: English, Portuguese, Spanish
- Edited by: Gregory Fernando Pappas

Publication details
- History: 2010-present
- Publisher: Texas A&M University
- Frequency: Biannual
- Open access: Yes

Standard abbreviations
- ISO 4: Inter-Am. J. Philos.

Indexing
- ISSN: 2157-1694
- OCLC no.: 660057872

Links
- Journal homepage

The Inter-American Journal of Philosophy is a biannual online peer-reviewed academic journal of philosophy established in 2010. It publishes papers in English, Portuguese and Spanish with a declared goal "to help bridge the gap in philosophy between the Americas by fostering a new philosophical dialogue", and "seeks to publish articles focused on past, present and possible future philosophical connections between philosophers and philosophic traditions in different parts of the Americas." The journal is abstracted and indexed by the Philosopher's Index. The editor-in-chief is Gregory Fernando Pappas (Texas A&M University).

As of January 2015 the members of the journal's editorial board are from Argentina, Brazil, Canada, Chile, Colombia, Guatemala, Peru, Spain, the United States and Uruguay, reflecting the "Inter-American" title.
