= Head Above the Water =

Studio album by Brigid Mae Power
- Released: 5 June 2020
- Studio: The Green Door, Dunfanaghy, Ireland
- Length: 46:33
- Label: Fire
- Producer: Brigid Mae Power; Alasdair Roberts; Peter Broderick

Brigid Mae Power chronology
The Two Worlds (2018)	Head Above the Water (2020)	Burning Your Lights (2021)

Professional ratings
Aggregate scores
Source	Rating
AnyDecentMusic?	7.6/10
Metacritic	82/100
Review scores
Source	Rating
AllMusic	3.5/5 stars
Clash	7/10
The Line of Best Fit	8/10
Mojo	4/5 stars
MusicOMH	4/5 stars
Pitchfork	7.8/10
The Observer	4/5 stars

Head Above the Water is the third studio album by Irish singer-songwriter Brigid Mae Power. It was released on 5 June 2020 under Fire Records.

The first single from the album "Wedding of a Friend" was released on 7 April 2020.

== Critical reception ==
Head Above the Water was met with "universal acclaim" reviews from critics. At Metacritic, which assigns a weighted average rating out of 100 to reviews from mainstream publications, this release received an average score of 82, based on 8 reviews. Aggregator Album of the Year gave the album a 79 out of 100 based on a critical consensus of 9 reviews. AnyDecentMusic? gave the release 7.6 out of 10.

== Track listing ==
Head Above the Water track listing
No.	Title	Length
1.	"On a City Night"	5:09
2.	"Wearing Red That Eve"	3:33
3.	"Wedding of a Friend"	4:39
4.	"Not Yours to Own"	3:25
5.	"I Was Named After You"	6:06
6.	"We Weren't Sure"	4:10
7.	"You Have a Quiet Power"	4:47
8.	"I Had to Keep My Circle Small"	5:18
9.	"The Blacksmith"	5:28
10.	"Head Above the Water"	3:58

== Personnel ==
- Brigid Mae Power – lead vocals, producer
- Peter Broderick – producer
- Liam Chapman – drums
- Brian MacGloinn – violin, vocals
- Brian Pyle – mastering
- Alasdair Roberts – producer
- Samuel Smith – engineer
