= Sine Missione =

Studio album by Omnia
- Released: 2000
- Genre: Pagan folk

Omnia chronology
Sine Missione	Sine Missione 2

Sine Missione (Latin: Without mercy) is the first album by Dutch Pagan folk band Omnia, recorded in 1999 and released in 2000. It was supposed to be an archeologically and historically promotional CD and not to be used for the popular market. It contains constructions of Roman and Gallo-Roman music. At this point Omnia was a theatre group (combat and ritual performances) of 8 to 14 people.

The CD is a collector's item since there were only 150 pieces released.

For the recording, crystals where placed in the microphones. This unique concept was developed by Norbert Veel (Liessel, NL). It gives a "unique sonic and emotional fidelity unknown in most modern recordings"

== Track listing ==
1. Sacrificium
2. Flora
3. Telethusa
4. Nox
5. Morrigan
6. Odi et Amo
7. Tartarus
8. Morpheus
9. Lesbia
10. Mars
11. Cernunnos
12. Iuno
13. Gaudia
14. Isis
15. Priapus
16. Rufa solo
