= Gregory Fernando Pappas =

American philosopher

- Born: February 9, 1960 (age 66)
- Awards: Ford Foundation Postdoctoral Fellowship, the William James and the Latin American Thought prizes, Mellow Prize

Education
- Education: University of Texas at Austin (Ph.D.)

Philosophical work
- Era: 21st-century philosophy
- Region: Western philosophy
- Institutions: Texas A&M University
- Website: http://goyopappas.com/

Gregory Fernando Pappas is a professor of philosophy at Texas A&M University. He is currently a National Humanities Center Fellow (for 2021-2022) And was senior fellow at Maria Sibylla Merian International Centre for Advanced Studies in the Humanities and Social Sciences Conviviality-Inequality in Latin America. Pappas works within the American Pragmatist and Latin American traditions in ethics and social-political philosophy. He is the author of numerous articles on the philosophy of William James, John Dewey, and Luis Villoro.

In 2018 Pappas was distinguished research fellow for the Latino Research Initiative at The University of Texas at Austin. He is the author of John Dewey’s Ethics: Democracy as Experience and Pragmatism in the Americas. He is the editor-in-chief of The Inter-American Journal of Philosophy, which is the first online journal devoted to inter-American philosophy with an inter-American editorial board that includes prominent philosophers from the Americas. He was a Fulbright scholar for the 2012–2013 academic year in Argentina and president of the Society for the Advancement of American Philosophy.

Pappas has been the recipient of a Ford Foundation Postdoctoral Fellowship, the William James and the Latin American Thought prizes by the American Philosophical Association, and the Mellow Prize by the Society for the Advancement of American Philosophy.

== Books ==
- John Dewey’s Ethics: Democracy as Experience
- Pragmatism in the Americas
