= Brigid Mae Power =

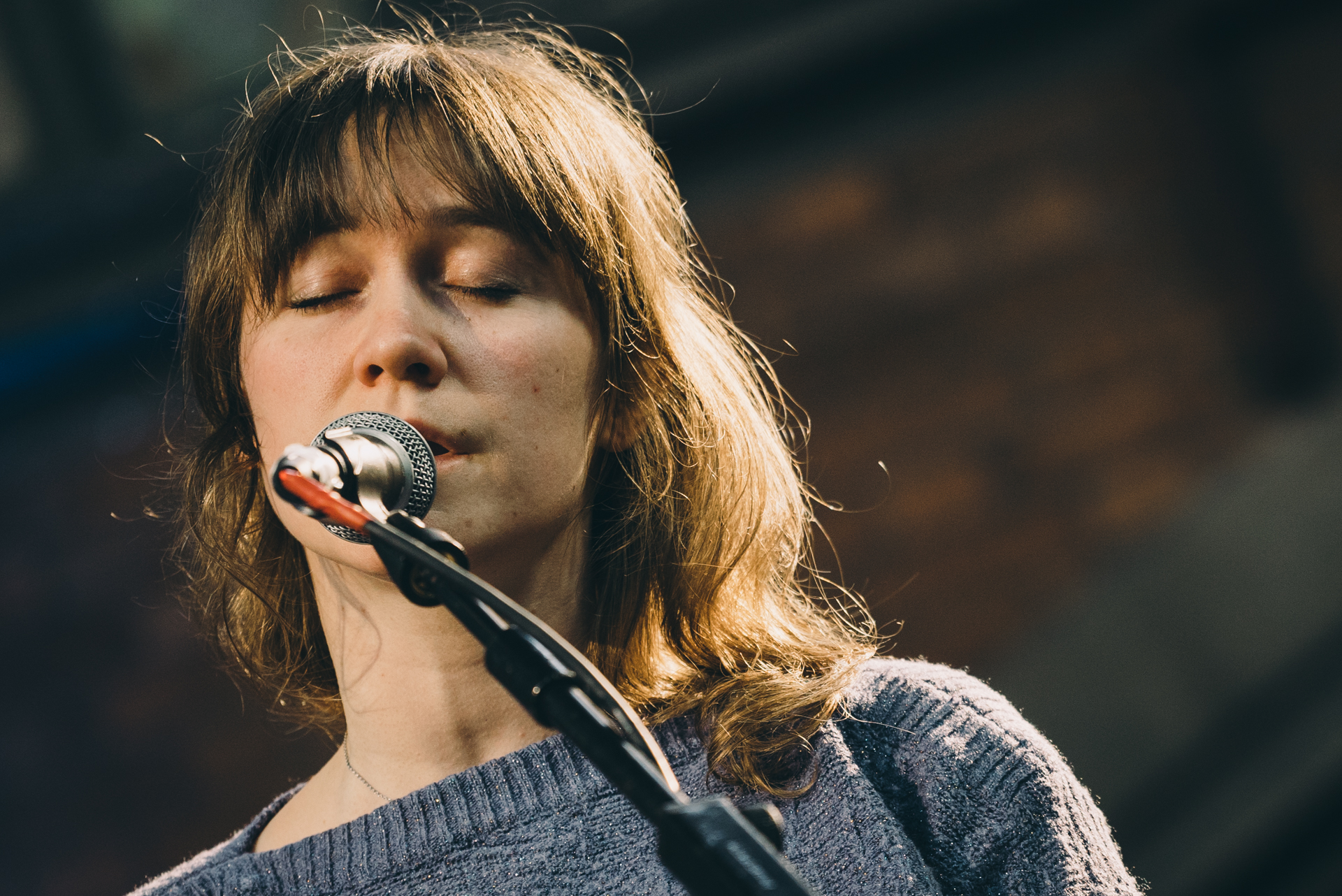
- Brigid Mae Power performing in 2017

Background information
- Born: London, England
- Origin: London/Galway
- Genre: folk
- Years active: 2010–present
- Labels: Fire Records, Tompkins Square Records

Brigid Mae Power is an Irish singer, songwriter, and musician.

== Early life ==
Born in London, England to Irish parents, Power's family moved to Ireland when she was eleven years old. There, she learned to play the button accordion before taking up singing and piano as a teenager.

== Career ==
Power began releasing music under the name "Brigid Power-Ryce" in 2010 when her debut EP, You Are Here, was released by the independent label Rusted Rail. This was followed by two self-released EPs, Ode to an Embryo in 2011 and Eee Tuts in 2013. Her live album, I Told You The Truth, recorded in St. Nicholas Collegiate Church in Galway, was released in 2014 by the label Abandon Reason. In a review of the album, The Irish Times wrote: "the setting gives her haunting vocals a spiritual resonance".

After meeting American musician Peter Broderick at a gig, Power travelled to Broderick's Studio in Portland, Oregon in 2015 to record her debut studio album. After finishing the album's production, she received a two-album deal from American label Tompkins Square Records.

Power's self-titled debut album, Brigid Mae Power, was released in 2016 and was a critical success, receiving positive reviews from Pitchfork, Record Collector, and The Guardian. In an interview with Uncut, Power stated that the album was inspired by her experiences as a single mother. She promoted the album with a tour of the UK and Japan.

In 2016, she married Peter Broderick; by 2023, they had separated.

Power's second studio album, The Two Worlds, was released in 2018. The album was met with widespread critical acclaim from the music press, with Pitchfork writing: "The Two Worlds is Power's most ambitious and her most introspective". The album received 4-star reviews from Uncut, The Guardian and Record Collector. The Line of Best Fit also wrote: "Stately, solemn, slow-burning and seriously beautiful, most of The Two Worlds isn't far removed from its predecessor's intimate templates".

Power's third album, Head Above the Water, was released in 2020 by Fire Records. In 2021, she appeared on Other Voices.

Power released her fourth LP, Dream from the Deep Well, in 2023. The album likewise received favourable reviews from critics, with an aggregate score of 76% on Metacritic. The album also entered the UK Official Folk Albums Chart at number 10.

== Discography ==
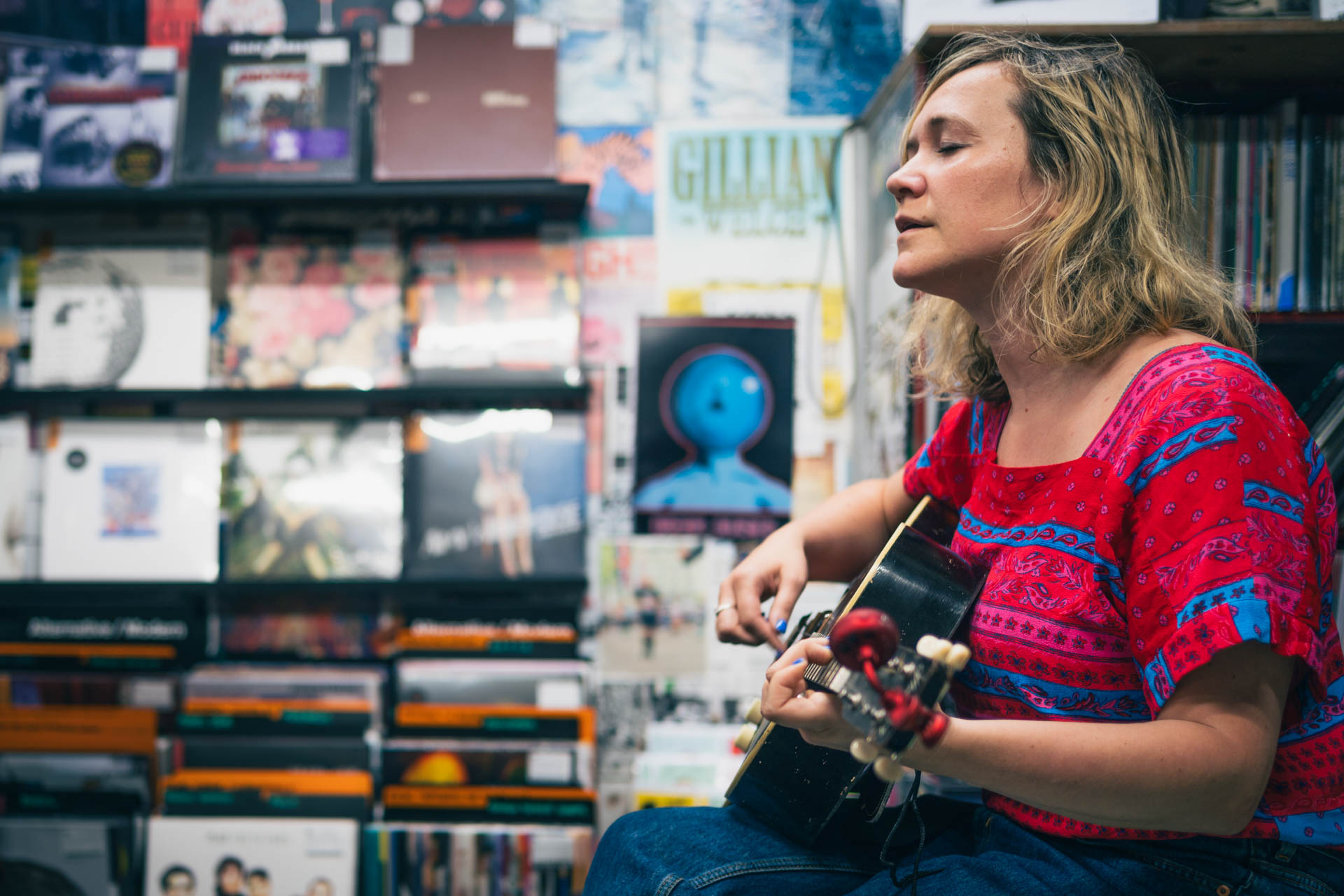
Brigid Mae Power at Rough Trade West in 2023

Albums

- Brigid Mae Power (2016)
- The Two Worlds (2018)
- Head Above the Water (2020)
- Dream from the Deep Well (2023)
- Songs for You (2025)

EPS

- You Are Here (2010)
- Ode to an Embryo (2011)
- Eee Tuts (2013)
- The Ones You Keep Close (2017)
- Burning Your Light (2021)

Live albums

- I Told You the Truth (2014)
