= George Pickow =

American photographer

- Born: February 11, 1922; Los Angeles, United States
- Died: December 10, 2010 (aged 88); Roslyn, New York
- Known for: Photography, Film

George Pickow (February 11, 1922 – December 10, 2010) was an American photographer and filmmaker who chronicled the folk and jazz music scenes in the United States, United Kingdom, and other countries. He was married to the well-known Kentucky folk musician Jean Ritchie.

== Early life ==
Pickow was born in Los Angeles but grew up in Brooklyn, New York. In the early 1940s, he was introduced to folk music when he heard Cisco Houston and Woody Guthrie jamming every night in a tiny cabin at the left-wing Camp Unity in upstate New York. Pickow studied painting at Cooper Union and made training films for the Navy in World War II.

== Work ==
In 1952, Pickow accompanied his wife Jean Ritchie on a Fulbright Scholarship to collect folk songs in Britain and Ireland. When Alan Lomax, then working out of London for the BBC, and his collaborator Peter Kennedy of the English Folk Dance and Song Society, decided to document the unique May Eve and May Day Festivals at Padstow in Cornwall, they selected Pickow to be their cameraman. The result was the 16-minute color film Oss Oss Wee Oss (1953).

In 1961, Pickow and Lomax collaborated on a short film documentary about the Greenwich Village folk revival scene intended to be shown on the BBC. This never happened, however, and ten years later Alan's daughter Anna Lomax Wood, edited the surviving scraps and fragments in her father's office into a short film, Ballads, Blues, and Bluegrass. In addition to Ritchie, Ballads, Blues, and Bluegrass features what one reviewer called "killer footage" of performances by Clarence Ashley, Guy Carawan, Willie Dixon, Ramblin' Jack Elliott, Roscoe Holcomb, Peter La Farge, Ernie Marrs, The New Lost City Ramblers, Memphis Slim, and the first known footage of a very young Doc Watson. In the audience are Maria Muldaur and Bob Dylan. Despite apocryphal tales, John Cohen of the New Lost City Ramblers affirms that Bob Dylan is not the male clog dancer at the beginning of the film.

In 1967, he helped film the Newport Folk Festival.

His photographs depict many musical artists, ranging from Louis Armstrong, Little Richard, and Theodore Bikel, to Pete Seeger and Judy Collins, as well as visual artists such as Edward Hopper and the model Pamela Green. He marketed his imagery through the international agency Three Lions Inc. for which he was the principal photographer, then partner.

His career also included an extensive documentation of Jean Ritchie's work and his photographs illustrated many of her books. In 1996 the Ritchie Pickow Photographic Archive was acquired by the James Hardiman Library, National University of Ireland, Galway.

== Marriage and family ==
Pickow and Ritchie met in 1948 at a square dance at the Henry Street Settlement. The following day, Pickow invited her to accompany him on a photo shoot at the Fulton Fish Market. "The result — Ms. Ritchie perched on the hood of a truck, holding a rather large lobster — was published in a trucking-industry magazine." They married in 1950 and had two sons, Peter and Jon.

== Death ==
Pickow, who had been in declining health for some time, died December 10, 2010, two days after his wife Jean Ritchie's 88th birthday.
