= Mary Elizabeth Barnicle =

American folklorist, professor (1891–1978)

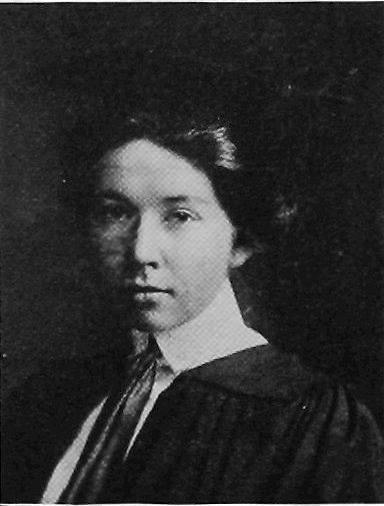
- Born: April 17, 1891
- Died: November 26, 1978 (aged 87)
- Resting place: Maryville
- Occupation: Professor
- Spouse(s): Tillman Cadle

Mary Elizabeth Cadle (née Barnicle; April 17, 1891 - November 26, 1978) was an American folklorist, Medieval English literature professor, and activist interested in women's and African-American rights, suffrage, and the labor movement. She collected and made numerous field recordings of folk songs and stories throughout the South and Caribbean from the mid-1930s until the early 1950s. She collected with Alan Lomax and later her husband, Tillman Cadle.

== Early life ==
Mary Elizabeth Barnicle was born on April 17, 1891, in Natick, Massachusetts. Her family later moved to Providence, Rhode Island, where they remained throughout her education, and where she taught evening school from 1910 to 1911. Barnicle attended Brown University, where she participated in the suffrage movement and graduated with her bachelor's degree in 1913. She was a graduate scholar in English at Bryn Mawr College from 1913 to 1914 and while continuing to teach, completed her Ph.D. around 1920. Cadle taught English and folklore at the University of Minnesota and Connecticut College. She spent a year teaching at Antioch College and left in 1924 to join the faculty of New York University, where she remained throughout the 1940s.

== Career ==
Barnicle's home in Greenwich Village was considered part of the folk music revival of the 1930s and 1940s. Leadbelly, Aunt Molly Jackson, and Sarah Ogan, among others, would spend time in her home. By the mid-1930s, Barnicle and Zora Neale Hurston had struck up a friendship, with Hurston speaking in Barnicle's NYU classes and Barnicle joining Hurston in Harlem to meet and record her friends. Previously, Barnicle had also become friends with John and Alan Lomax and proposed a collection trip with Alan during his summer break from college. However, in May 1935, she proposed instead that she, Hurston, and Alan Lomax would tour and collect throughout the Southeast. That summer, while he was on summer break from the University of Texas, Lomax, Hurston, and Barnicle toured the Southern United States and parts of the Bahamas (specifically Nassau and Andros) to record folk songs and stories. Hurston ended up only accompanying them for part of the trip due to disagreements with Barnicle; Hurston returned home and Barnicle and Lomax continued to the Bahamas without her. During their trip, Alan was in charge and had two years of collecting and recording experience, Barnicle kept notes and had knowledge of ballads and folk songs, and Hurston served as their gatekeeper and guide to Southern and African American culture. Together, they attended gatherings, meetings, and met with individuals with a large recording device, on which they made over two hundred records of African American folk songs and stories.

During that same year, Tillman Cadle, a labor activist and coal miner, would travel to New York to have surgery on a shoulder injury and while there, he met Barnicle through his friend, Jim Garland. Cadle and Barnicle shared a love and interest in documenting and collecting ballads. Around 1936, Cadle and Barnicle married but they lived apart until after World War II. During that time, Cadle would frequently travel between New York City and Kentucky, making extended visits to both locations and he and Barnicle would make field recordings of folk artists. Cadle would also often serve as gatekeeper for Barnicle to record in Appalachia as he would contact and set up meetings with individuals for her to record. Between 1937 and 1949 Mary Elizabeth and Tillman Cadle traveled around eastern Tennessee and Kentucky recording folk songs, love songs, ballads, and work songs.

Mary Elizabeth Barnicle recorded interviews for the Library of Congress' "Voices Remembering Slavery: Freed People Tell Their Stories" (formerly "Voices From the Days of Slavery: Former Slaves Tell Their Stories") collection. She also recorded and worked with Lead Belly (Huddie Ledbetter), she took him around New York City and introduced him to others in the folk music movement, namely Woody Guthrie and Pete Seeger. She joined the faculty of the University of Tennessee - Knoxville as an English instructor in October, 1946 but retired 3 years later. In 1949, Tillman Cadle moved to Rich Mountain Gap, near Townsend, Tennessee, not far from Knoxville, and Barnicle joined him there.

Barnicle retired in 1950, and she and Cadle moved to Natick, Massachusetts, they would live there and in Worcester until 1971, when they moved back to their home in Rich Mountain Gap.

== Legacy ==
Barnicle was a member of the Modern Language Association and Vice President of the Folklore Society of Tennessee in 1949. She died November 26, 1978, at her and Cadle's Rich Mountain Gap Home.

Mary Elizabeth Barnicle collections are held at:

- Mary Elizabeth Barnicle and Tillman Cadle Collection, Archives of Appalachia, East Tennessee State University - Collection contains biographical information, audio tapes and discs, field recordings, and an interview with Tillman Cadle.
- Papers of Mary Elizabeth Barnicle Cadle, 1915-1978, Schlesinger Library, Radcliffe Institute, Harvard University - Collection contains lecture notes, tales and songs, correspondence, and photographs
- Recordings from Mary Elizabeth Barnicle and Alan Lomax's trip throughout the American South and Bahamas are held in the American Folklife Collection of the Library of Congress.
