= Viper, Kentucky =

Unincorporated community in Kentucky, United States

- Unincorporated community
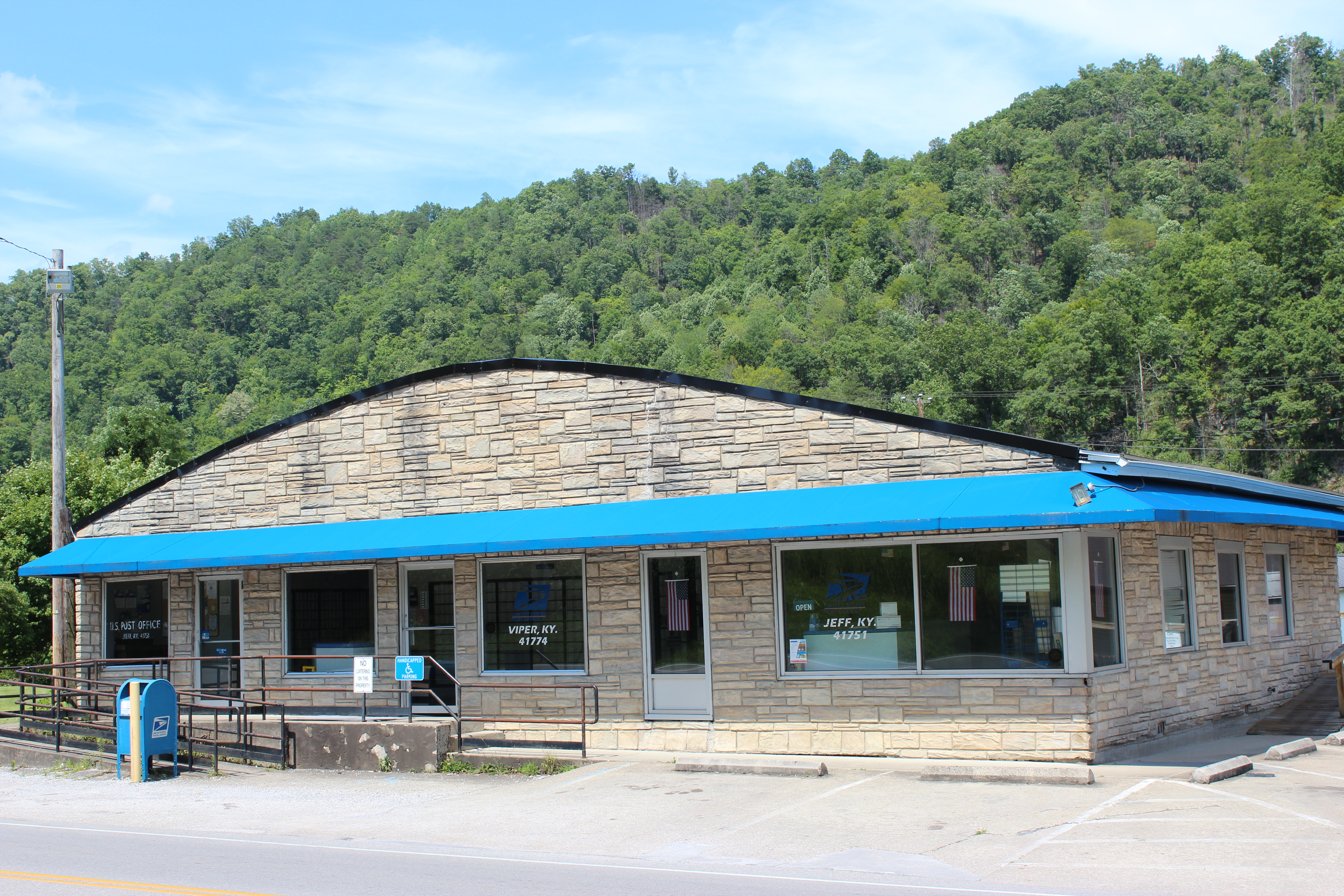
- Jeff and Viper Post Office

- Location within Kentucky
- Coordinates: 37°10′58″N 83°08′54″W
- Country: United States
- State: Kentucky
- County: Perry
- Elevation: 902 ft (275 m)
- Time zone: UTC-5 (Eastern (EST))
  - Summer (DST): UTC-4 (EDT)
- ZIP code: 41774
- Area code: 606
- GNIS feature ID: 516188

Viper is an unincorporated community in Perry County, Kentucky, United States.

== History ==
The community was named on account of viper snakes near the original town site.

== Geography ==
Today, Viper is served by Kentucky Route 7, 5 miles (8.0 km) south-southeast of Hazard. Viper has a post office with ZIP code 41774.

== Notable person ==
- Jean Ritchie, folk singer
