= Horton Barker =

American traditional and gospel singer (1889–1973)

- Born: August 23, 1889; Laurel Bloomery, Tennessee, U.S.
- Died: August 12, 1973 (aged 83)
- Occupation: Traditional Singer

Horton Barker (August 23, 1889 – August 12, 1973) was an Appalachian traditional singer.

== Early life ==
Barker was born in Laurel Bloomery, Tennessee, US. Blind nearly all his life, Barker learned his unusually wide repertoire at the School for the Deaf and Blind in Staunton, Virginia, as well as at folk festivals in Whitetop, Virginia.

== Career ==
Barker's pure-toned tenor voice earned him a bare living around the region but also brought him to the attention of folklorist Alan Lomax, who recorded Barker in 1937, and later folksinger, folksong collector, and field recorder Sandy Paton, who recorded Barker's 1962 LP Horton Barker: Traditional Singer. In his early 70s when this LP was recorded, Barker still had a fine singing voice, and the record was praised for its interesting range of material, from ballads (including four Child ballads) to sacred songs "in the older rubato style." This record was released on the Folkways label, catalog number FA 2362.

At the age of 75, Barker appeared at the 1965 Newport Folk Festival. A brief portion of the song "Pretty Sally" from Barker's Saturday performance at that festival is featured in the 1967 documentary film Festival, directed by Murray Lerner.

== Death ==
Horton Barker died in 1973 at the age of 83.
