= Omnia (band) =

Dutch band

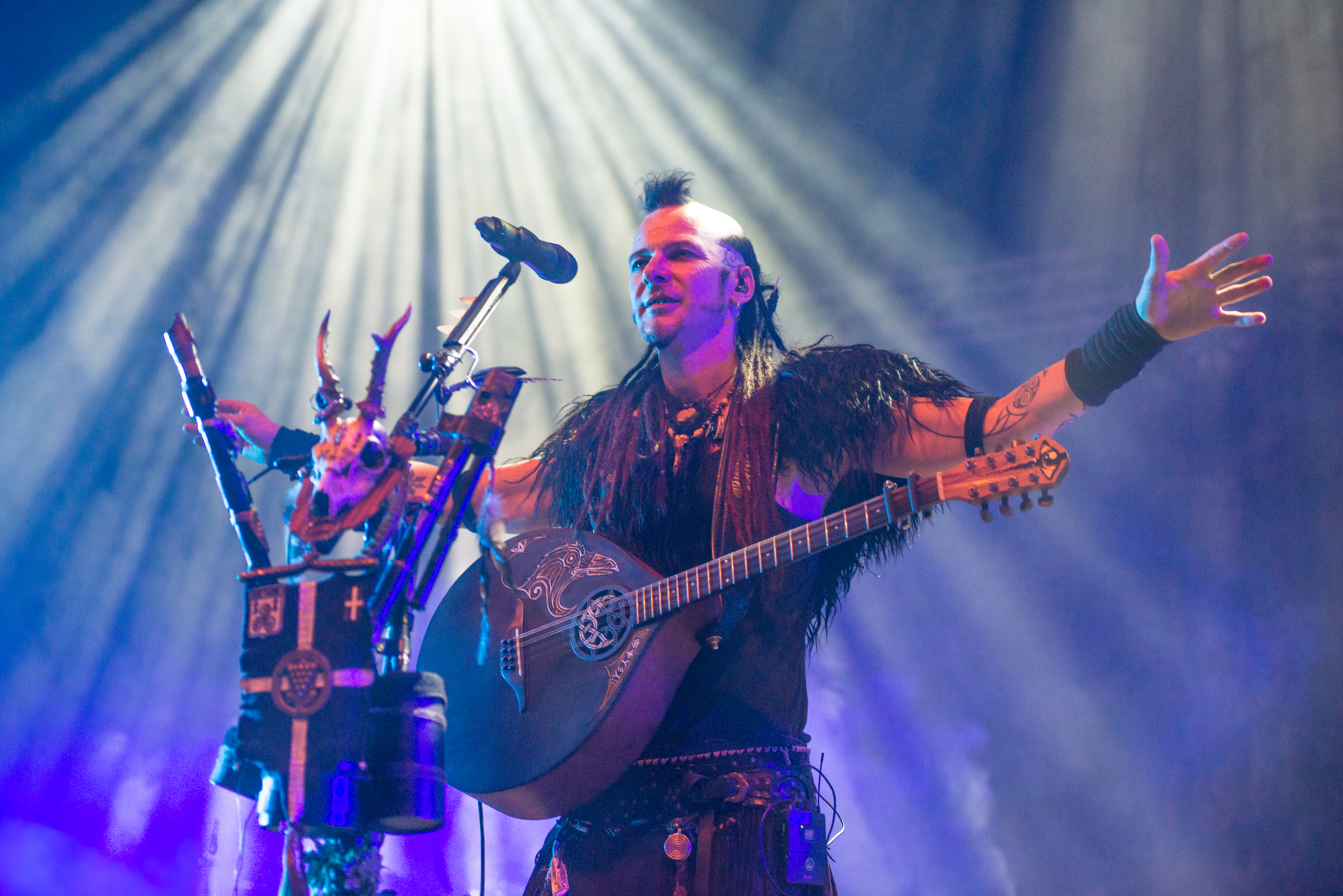
- Omnia performing in 2014

Background information
- Origin: Netherlands
- Genre: Pagan folk
- Years active: 1996–present
- Label: PaganScum Records/Terra OMNIA Productions
- Members: Steve "Sic" Evans-van der Harten; Jennifer Evans-van der Harten; Daphyd "Crow" Sens; Aleš Uratnik
- Website: www.worldofomnia.com

Omnia is a self-described "neoceltic pagan folk" band based in the Netherlands, whose members over the years have had Irish, Dutch, Cornish, Belgian, Indonesian, and Persian backgrounds. Their music takes the form of various cultural routes, from places such as Ireland, England, Cornwall, and Iran. The name of the band is a Latin word that means "everything".

They sing in English, French, Breton, Finnish, German, Dutch, Swedish, Latin, and Hindi, and play Celtic harp, mouth harp, hurdy-gurdy, bodhrán, guitar, bouzouki, didgeridoo, flutes of all kinds, bagpipes, various drums and percussion instruments.

== History ==
=== Origin ===
In 1994, Sic collaborated with Walter Maioli, an Italian researcher of ancient musical instruments, multi-instrumentalist, and composer. Together, they reconstructed prehistoric and early Roman music for the archaeological theme park Archeon.

In 1995, Sic founded the Gallo-Roman band Pantheon. This group performed compositions dedicated to various gods and goddesses of the classical Roman period and the Celtic Iron Age. The compositions were played on self-made reconstructions of Roman and ancient Celtic double flutes and shawms.

Commissioned by the Provincial Archaeological Museum in Velzeke (Belgium), performances were given featuring Roman music, gladiator fights, and Roman religious rituals. This laid the foundation for the historical theatre company that was established in January 1996. All props and costumes for these performances were created in the workshop of Chaos in Motion, an artists’ collective founded in the late 1980s by Sic and Misja van Laatum. The name Omnia originated from Chaos in Motion’s motto Omnia chaos est (“everything is chaos”).

== Present ==
After selling their property in Netherlands, Omnia frontman Steve "Sic" Evans-van der Haren and Jennifer Evans-van der Harten started to live on a 40 acre property "Terra Omnia" in rural Slovenia and continue to make music. They deleted band's Facebook profile but continue to be present on Instagram, YouTube, Spotify and Apple Music. Steve occasionally publishes articles on the band's website with closed comment section including his views on politics, capitalism or paganism, and promotes various conspiracy theories, criticism of wester civilisation etc. In November 2025 he made transphobic and anti-drag queen remarks in his article in reaction of being accused of homophobic views.

== Band line-up ==
=== Present band line-up ===
- Steve "Sic" Evans van der Harten (lead vocals, double flute, overtone flute, whistle, bouzouki, darbukka, dombek, davul, mouth harp)
- Jennifer "Jenny" Evans van der Harten (lead vocals, Celtic tall harp, piano, hurdy-gurdy, bodhrán, hammered dulcimer)
- Daphyd "Crow" Sens (triple-slide didgeridoo, mouth harp, vocals).
- Aleš Uratnik (Guitar)

=== Prior band members ===
- Noel "Caicus" Franken (percussion)
- Joyce "Gaudia" Hellendoorn (vocals, flute and percussion)
- Saskia "Zaza" van Koningsbrugge (dance, percussion)
- Mirjam "Ursula" van den Boogaard (percussion)
- Mark "Argus" van den Broek (acrobatics and juggling)
- René "Gaius" van de Schuur (fencing)
- Tijn "Timor" Rams (fencing)
- Floris "Florissimo" Pasma (juggling and fire performance)
- Ben "Kleine Ben" van Koert (percussion)
- Nico "Catilina" van Malssen (percussion, mask play, haruspex) (1995–1997)
- Angela "Thalia" van Malssen (dance) (1995–1996)
- Louis "Luka" Aubri (fencing, didgeridoo, vocals and percussion) (1996–2010)
- Susanne Ruhling (vocals, dance and percussion) (c. 1998–c. 2003)
- Joseph "Joe" Hennon (DADGAD guitar) (2004–2010)
- Michel "Mich" Rozek (drums) (2007–2009)
- Misja "Barca" van Laatum (vocals, percussion) (2007–2009)
- Joost "Yoast" van Es (guitar and violin) (2009)
- Tom "Tommy" Spaan (drums and percussion) (2009–2011)
- Philip Steenbergen (acoustic guitar, DADGAD guitar, darbuka) (2010–2013)
- Satria "Sunfire" Karsono (guitar, vocals, banjo) (2013–2016)
- Rob "Thunder" van Barschot (drums and percussion) (2011–2018)

== Discography ==
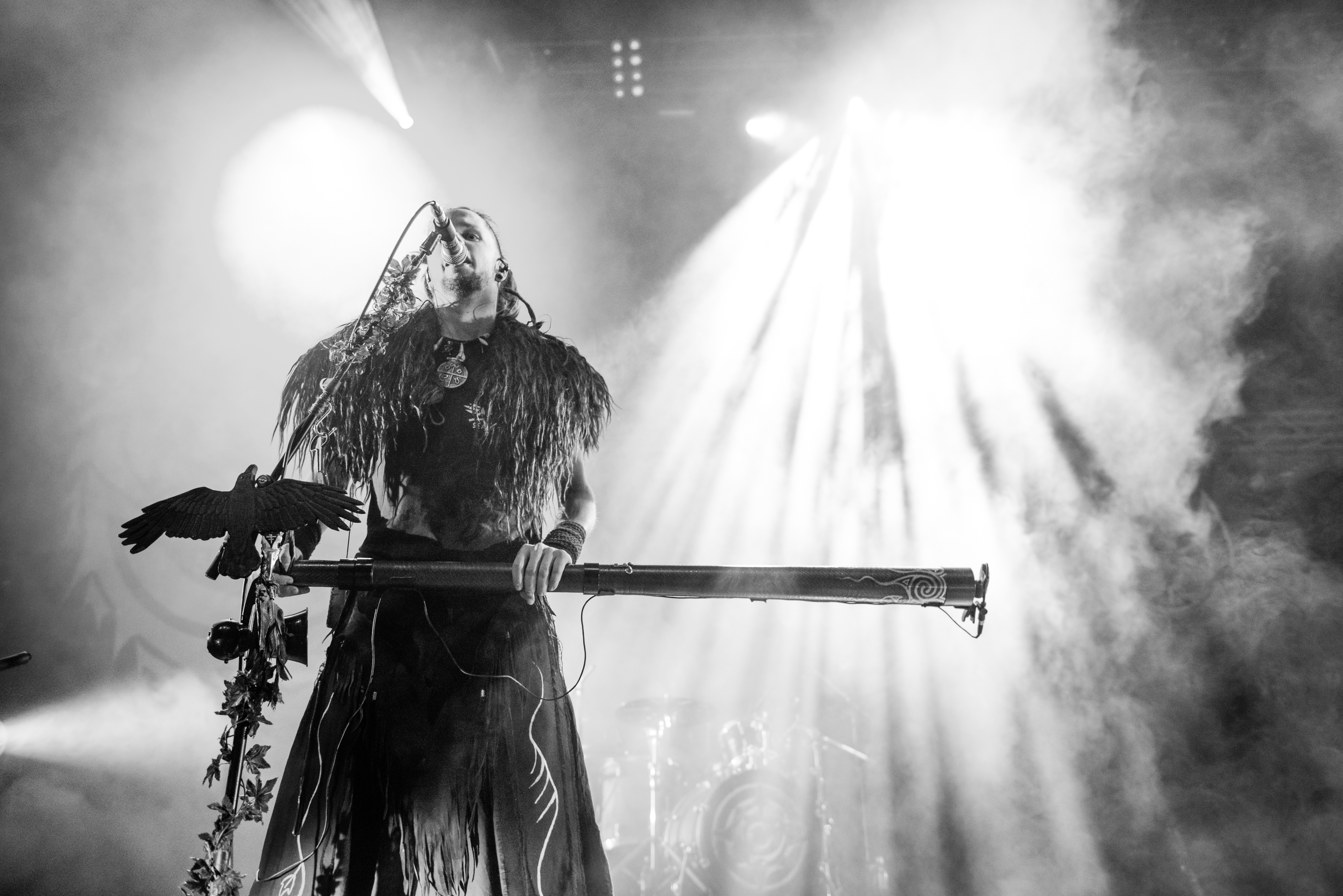
Daphyd "Crow" Sens with Didgeridoo

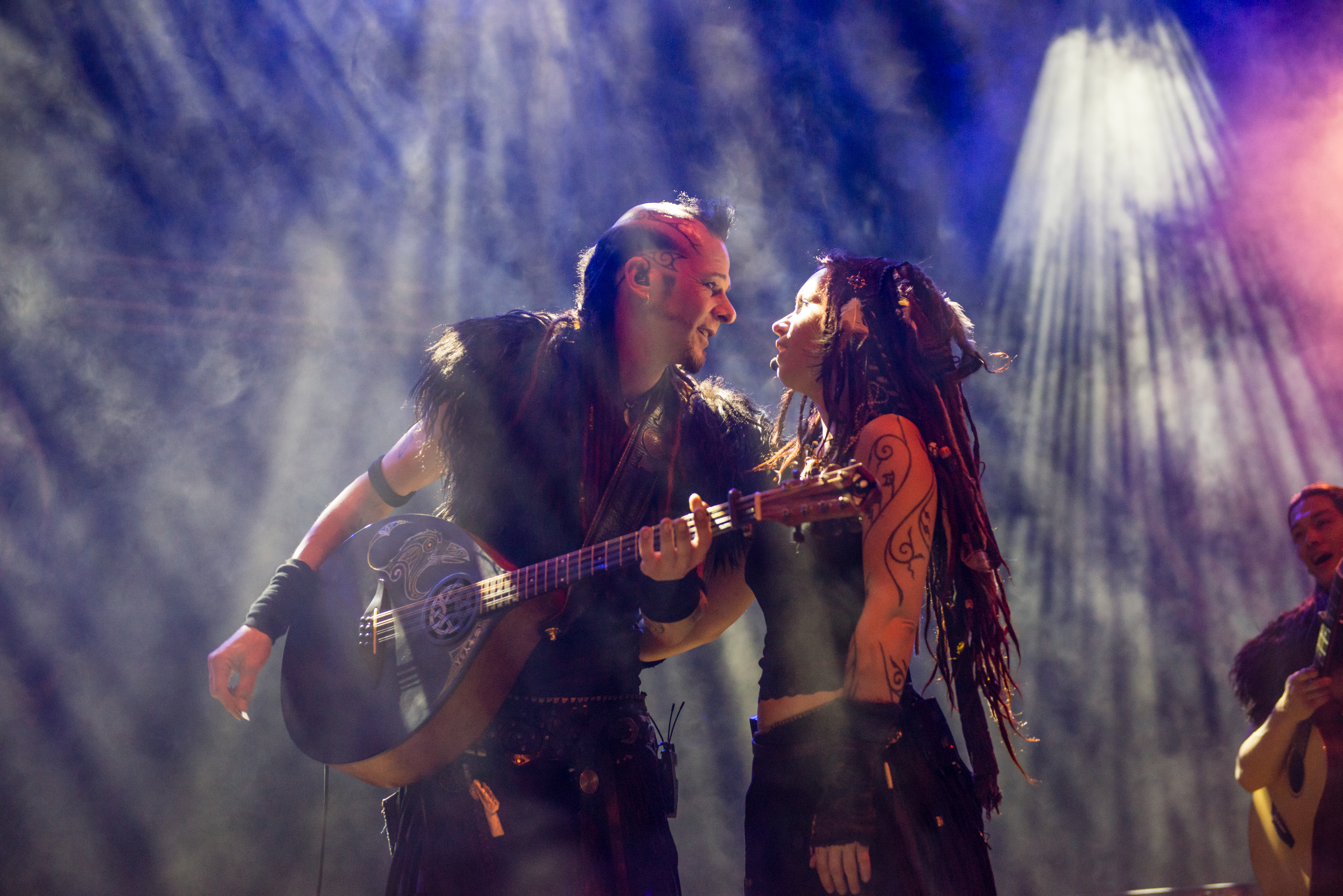
Steve and Jenny

=== Studio albums ===
- Sine Missione (recorded 1999, released 2000, no label)
- Sine Missione II (2002, Emmuty records)
- OMNIA "3" (2003, Zap Prod.)
- Crone of War (2004, Zap Prod.) — An album that focuses on Celtic mythology, such as the Mabon festival and gods such as Cernunnos and Taranis.
- PaganFolk (2006, PaganScum records) — An album with numerous traditional instruments employed. The style has been compared to the music of the German band Faun.
- Alive! (2007 PaganScum records). — The witches scene from Shakespeare's Macbeth, "The Raven" by Edgar Allan Poe and a poem by Lewis Carroll were set to music on this release. The artwork was created together with Alan Lee.
- Wolf Love (2010, PaganScum records) — Contains all the different music styles OMNIA is capable of. Includes a free DVD of live material of the 2010 line-up . "Jabberwocky" by Lewis Carroll was set to music on this release.
- Musick and Poëtree (2011, PaganScum records) — a two-disc CD with one recorded with members of the 2011 line-up and the other recorded by Stenny, solo. Notable songs are Free and a cover of the classic Wim Sonneveld song Het dorp about the modernisation of rural life in the Netherlands, which is sung by Steve Sic in Dutch, the first ever Dutch language song by OMNIA.
- Earth Warrior (2014)
- Naked Harp (2015) Jenny's solo album.
- Prayer (2016)
- Reflexions (2018)

=== Live albums ===
- Live Religion (2005, PaganScum records) — Live album recorded in a church with one microphone.
- PaganFolk At The Fairy Ball (2008, PaganScum records) — A live album downloadable for free from the official website
- Live on Earth (2012)

=== Compilations and remixes ===
- Cybershaman (2007, PaganScum records) — A remix album featuring eight Omnia songs in Trance music and Electronic style.
- History (2007, PaganScum records) (American sampler) — Compilation album specifically made and remastered for United States sales.
- World Of Omnia (2009, PaganScum records) — Partly a re-mastered compilation of older OMNIA works together with reworked new recordings and two original tracks.

=== DVD ===
- Pagan Folk Lore (2008, PaganScum records) — live DVD containing interviews and performances of the 2008 line-up

== Links related to songs performed by Omnia ==
- An Dro
- Lughnasadh
- Morrígan
- Odi et Amo
- Teutates
- "Twa Corbiez" (a version of The Three Ravens)
- "Dúlamán"
- Bealtaine

== See also ==
- Music of the Netherlands
- Music of Cornwall
- Paganism
- Celtic Neopaganism
- Pagan rock
