= List of songs recorded by the Badlees =

Between 1990 and 2010 The Badlees recorded seven full-length albums and two EPs, all of which are studio albums. There have been no live recordings of the band released as of 2010.

== Songs (alphabetical) ==
Song	Composer(s)	Album	Year	Time
"34 Winters"	Feltenberger	Up There, Down Here	1999	4:55
"90% of the Time"	Naydock	The Day's Parade	1998	5:42
"A Better Way to Save the World"	Badlees	Unfortunate Result of Spare Time	1993	3:55
"A Fever"	Naydock, Palladino	Amazing Grace	1999	4:56
"A Little Faith"	Alexander	Up There, Down Here	1999	7:31
"A Matter of Time"	Badlees	Unfortunate Result of Spare Time	1993	5:30
"Ain't No Man"	Smith	Amazing Grace	1999	3:05
"All Right Now"	Alexander, Badlees	Love Is Rain	2009	2:51
"Amazing Grace to You"	Alexander	Amazing Grace	1999	4:34
"Angeline Is Coming Home"	Naydock, Badlees	River Songs	1995	4:09
"Angels of Mercy"	Alexander, Badlees	River Songs	1995	4:11
"Anodyne"	Alexander, Naydock, Badlees	Love Is Rain	2009	4:57
"Appalachian Scream"	Feltenberger, Yashinsky	Amazing Grace	1999	3:37
"Atlantic City"	Springsteen	The Day's Parade	1998	3:35
"Back Where We Come From"	Alexander	Diamonds in the Coal	1992	3:26
"Bendin' the Rules"	Alexander, Naydock, Smith, Badlees	River Songs	1995	6:10
"The Best Damn Things in Life Are Free"	Alexander	It Ain't for You	1990	4:19
"Beyond These Walls"	Alexander, Naydock	Amazing Grace	1999	2:43
"Cellarbird and Zither"	Alexander	Up There, Down Here	1999	0:48
"Diamonds in the Coal"	Alexander	Diamonds in the Coal	1992	4:42
"Diamonds in the Coal"	Alexander	The Day's Parade	1998	4:29
"Dirty Neon Times"	Alexander, Naydock	Diamonds in the Coal	1992	3:49
"Don't Let Me Hide"	Alexander	Up There, Down Here	1999	4:37
"Done For Love"	Alexander, Badlees	Renew	2002	3:13
"Don't Ever Let Me Down"	Alexander, Badlees	Love Is Rain	2009	3:59
"Drive Back Home"	Alexander, Badlees	Love Is Rain	2009	4:40
"Easier Done Than Said"	Badlees	Unfortunate Result of Spare Time	1993	4:10
"Fear of Falling"	Alexander, Badlees	River Songs	1995	4:50
"Four Leaf Clover"	Alexander, Badlees	Renew	2002	3:59
"Gone"	Alexander	Amazing Grace	1999	2:13
"Grill the Sucker"	Badlees	River Songs	1995	1:13
"Gwendolyn"	Alexander, Badlees	River Songs	1995	4:21
"Heaven On Earth"	Alexander, Feltenberger	Diamonds in the Coal	1992	3:32
"Hindsightseeing"	Alexander, Badlees	Renew	2002	3:46
"I Don't Believe in You"	Alexander, Badlees	Renew	2002	2:53
"I Liked You Better"	Alexander, Welsh, Badlees	River Songs	1995	4:21
"I'm Not Here Anymore"	Alexander	Amazing Grace	1999	4:32
"In a Minor Way"	Alexander	Amazing Grace	1999	3:21
"Interlude / Badlee Rap"	Loose Bruce, Badlees	Diamonds in the Coal	1992	1:21
"It Ain't for You"	Alexander	It Ain't for You	1990	3:58
"It Don't Matter Anymore to Me"	Badlees	Unfortunate Result of Spare Time	1993	3:34
"Just One Moment"	Alexander	Diamonds in the Coal	1992	3:41
"Last Great Act of Defiance"	Alexander, Naydock	It Ain't for You	1990	3:39
"Last Great Act of Defiance"	Alexander, Naydock	The Day's Parade	1998	3:45
"Laugh to Keep From Cryin'"	Badlees	Unfortunate Result of Spare Time	1993	3:56
"Laundromat Radio"	Badlees	Unfortunate Result of Spare Time	1993	3:41
"Leaning On the Day's Parade"	Alexander, Naydock	The Day's Parade	1998	2:40
"Like a Rembrandt"	Alexander, Naydock	Diamonds in the Coal	1992	3:35
"Little Eddie"	Alexander, Naydock	Unfortunate Result of Spare Time	1993	4:07
"Little Hell"	Smith	Up There, Down Here	1999	3:19
"Long Goodnight"	Smith	Amazing Grace	1999	4:00
"Love All"	Alexander	Up There, Down Here	1999	3:08
"Luther's Window"	Alexander	Up There, Down Here	1999	3:56
"Mama They Must Be Crazy"	Alexander, Naydock	It Ain't for You	1990	3:17
"Me, Myself, and I"	Alexander, Naydock	Unfortunate Result of Spare Time	1993	4:25
"Middle of the Busiest Road"	Alexander, Naydock	Up There, Down Here	1999	4:50
"Mystery Girl"	Alexander, Naydock	Diamonds in the Coal	1992	3:31
"The Next Big Thing"	Alexander, Naydock	Diamonds in the Coal	1992	3:42
"Nothing Much of Anything"	Naydock, Badlees	River Songs	1995	3:36
"Once In a While"	Alexander, Naydock. Badlees	Renew	2002	2:59
"Ore Hill"	Feltenberger, Badlees	River Songs	1995	5:55
"Part of a Rainbow"	Alexander, Badlees	Love Is Rain	2009	4:34
"Peter Pan"	Alexander, Badlees	Love Is Rain	2009	3:25
"Poison Ivy"	Alexander	Amazing Grace	1999	3:25
"Queen of Perfection"	Alexander, Badlees	River Songs	2009	3:03
"Radio at Night"	Alexander, Naydock, Badlees	Love Is Rain	2009	3:46
"The Real Thing"	Alexander, Naydock	Diamonds in the Coal	1992	3:57
"Renew"	Alexander, Badlees	Renew	2002	3:40
"Road to Paradise"	Feltenberger	Diamonds in the Coal	1992	3:42
"Running Up That Hill"	Naydock, Badlees	Up There, Down Here	1999	4:27
"The Second Coming of Chris"	Feltenberger, Alexander	Up There, Down Here	1999	4:36
"See Me As a Picture"	Alexander, Badlees	Renew	2002	2:45
"She's the Woman"	Badlees	Unfortunate Result of Spare Time	1993	3:25
"Silly Little Man"	Alexander	Up There, Down Here	1999	4:18
"Sister Shirley"	Alexander, Naydock	Diamonds in the Coal	1992	3:45
"Song for a River"	Alexander, Naydock, Badlees	River Songs	1995	8:17
"Spending My Inheritance"	Alexander	Diamonds in the Coal	1992	4:37
"Star to Fall"	Alexander, Badlees	Love Is Rain	2009	4:02
"Starthrower"	Alexander, Badlees	Love Is Rain	2009	3:53
"These Are the People That Own the World"	Alexander	Renew	2002	4:00
"Thinking In Ways"	Alexander, Naydock	Up There, Down Here	1999	4:52
"Time Turns Around"	Alexander	Amazing Grace	1999	2:53
"Too Many Changes"	Alexander, Badlees	Renew	2002	4:56
"Tore Down Flat in Jackson"	Naydock, Badlees	Unfortunate Result of Spare Time	1993	4:56
"Two States"	Alexander	Love Is Rain	2009	5:19
"The Unfunny"	Naydock, Badlees	Unfortunate Result of Spare Time	1993	3:14
"Way Back Home"	Alexander, Badlees	Love Is Rain	2009	4:18
"We Will"	Alexander, Badlees	Love Is Rain	2009	4:10
"Well Laid Plans"	Alexander, Naydock, Badlees	Love Is Rain	2009	4:18
"Which One of You"	Alexander, Naydock	Up There, Down Here	1999	4:23
"You're Not the Only One"	Badlees	Unfortunate Result of Spare Time	1993	3:55
