= Unforgettable Big Band =

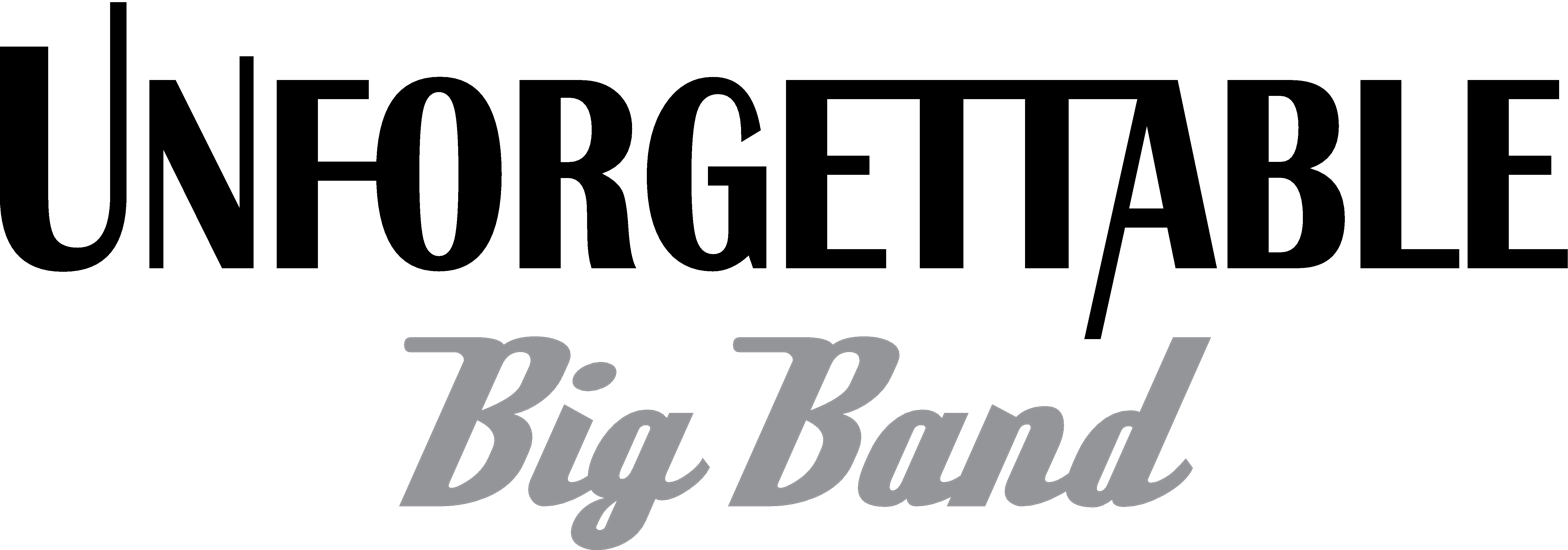
- The official logo of the Unforgettable Big Band

Background information
- Also known as: Unforgettable Big Band, Inc.
- Origin: York, York County, Pennsylvania, United States
- Genres: Big band
- Years active: 2000–present
- Website: www.unforgettablebigband.com

The Unforgettable Big Band is a community big band based in York, Pennsylvania that was founded in 2000. The band performs a diverse repertoire, incorporating genres of swing, pop, rock, country, patriotic anthems, and opera. While rooted in the traditions of the big band era, the ensemble also includes music from earlier periods as well as contemporary selections.

The band has received local recognition, winning multiple Central Pennsylvania Music Awards, and maintains a presence across the Mid-Atlantic region.

== History ==
The Unforgettable Big Band was founded in the summer of 2000 by saxophonist Steve Spangler in Lake Meade, Adams County, within East Berlin, Pennsylvania. Initially, a small group of local musicians gathered biweekly in Spangler’s garage to play big band music. With input from Jim Spark, Minister of Music at First Presbyterian Church in York, the group gradually expanded, with Spark serving as musical director and Spangler as band manager.

The band's first public performance was at a charity fundraiser for the Lake Meade Homeowners Association, which became a recurring event. As its reputation grew, the band acquired a sound system and stage lighting, and rehearsals were moved to First Presbyterian Church in York.

Early performances focused on events for World War II veterans and local charities. Over time, the band broadened its outreach, supporting organizations such as Habitat for Humanity, the Shriners, and Wounded Warriors of PA. The band also performs at local theaters.

In the late 2000s, clarinetist and saxophonist Thomas "Thom" McLaughlin became the band’s musical director, with Lindy Mack as assistant director and arranger. The band expanded its regional presence, performing at events such as the Les Brown Festival in Tower City, the National Cherry Blossom Festival in Washington, D.C., and the Frank Sinatra Centennial Celebration in Hoboken, New Jersey.

The band transitioned into a nonprofit organization, emphasizing education and preservation of big band music.

The Unforgettable Big Band has been recognized for its contributions to the Central Pennsylvania music scene, winning two Central Pennsylvania Music Awards. In 2019, the band won "Best Variety/Dance Band" at the inaugural Central Pennsylvania Music Awards. In 2021, the band won the "Cover-to-Cover" Award for their recording of Fighter by York-based country artist Corina Aucker arranged by musical director Lindy Mack.

== Notable performances ==
In 2017, York's Unforgettable Big Band hosted the "Big Swing Thing," an event aimed at reviving the swing era and returning the Valencia to a hub of dancing. The event featured multiple swing and dance bands from around the Mid-Atlantic region. Then-director of the band Thomas "Thom" McLaughlin planned and executed the event annually until his unexpected passing in November 2021.

In 2026, the band, under the direction of Lindy Mack, hosted a program on the eve of the Semiquincentennial called "Freedom Is Not Free": A Celebration of the York Community and America's 250th, held at the Valencia Ballroom in York, Pennsylvania. Presented as a vintage World War II USO-style show and canteen, the evening honored the York Plan, a wartime model of industrial cooperation credited with contributing to the Allied war effort, and paid tribute to the community's veterans, active-duty service members, and first responders. The event was co-chaired by lead male vocalist Jim Scofield and Assistant Director Michael Kirk, and drew over 450 attendees. The program received formal commendations from York Mayor Sandie Walker, Pennsylvania Governor Josh Shapiro, the York County Board of Commissioners, and U.S. Representative Scott Perry, recognizing the band's contribution to the county's Semiquincentennial commemorations. All profits from the event were donated to local veterans' and first responder charities, including Pennsylvania Wounded Warriors, Wreaths Across America, and American Gold Star Mothers.

== Current band ==
The band consists of a traditional big band set-up of saxophones, trumpets, trombones, a rhythm section, and vocalists. Members include:

- Saxophones: Dave Murphy, John Mohr, Donald Kessler, Michael Kirk, Carissa Duttry, Suzanne Mescan
- Trumpets: Jim Smolko, Chris McKee, Randy Gutacker, Kirk Frey
- Trombones: Nick Berger, Lani Deatherage, Jim Young, Tami Morningstar, Nate Krebs
- Rhythm Section: Lindy Mack, John Batzer, Jay Rubin, Brenton Downs
- Vocalists: Jim Scofield, Christy Weist, Anna Pavoncello

== Leadership ==
The band is incorporated and managed by its by-laws. Per these, there is an officer board composed of four officers elected annually at an annual business meeting. The officer board selects the musical director, and the musical director selects the assistant musical director.

The 2025 officer board of the Unforgettable Big Band is as follows:

- Kirk Frey, President
- Nick Berger, Vice President
- Jay Rubin, Treasurer
- Christy Weist, Secretary

The current musical directors of the Unforgettable Big Band are as follows:

- Lindy Mack, Musical Director
- Lani Deatherage, Assistant Musical Director

== Discography ==
The band has released several albums and singles on streaming services and CDs:

- American Feeling (2013)
- Fifteen 4 Fifteen (2015)
- Sinatra Centennial: A Tribute to the Man and His Music (2015)
- Fighter [Single] (2021)
- You Can't Do That with a Big Band! (2024)
- Ladies Night: Great Women of the Big Band Era (2025)
- Unforgettable [Single] (2025)

== Awards and nominations ==
Award	Year	Category	Result
Central Pennsylvania Music Hall of Fame	2020	Best Ensemble	Won
Central Pennsylvania Music Hall of Fame	2021	Best Variety/Dance Band	Nominated
Central Pennsylvania Music Hall of Fame	2021	Cover-to-Cover Award	Won
Central Pennsylvania Music Hall of Fame	2022	Best Variety/Dance Band	Nominated
Central Pennsylvania Music Hall of Fame	2024	Best Variety/Dance Band	Nominated
Central Pennsylvania Music Hall of Fame	2026	Best Jazz Band	Nominated
