= Central Pennsylvania Music Hall of Fame =

Museum and hall of fame in Hummelstown, Pennsylvania

- Established: 2019
- Location: Hummelstown, Pennsylvania
- Coordinates: 40°15′47″N 76°41′17″W
- Type: Hall of fame
- Founder: Brandon Valentine
- Website: cpmhof.com

The Central Pennsylvania Music Hall of Fame is a nonprofit organization and museum in Hummelstown, Pennsylvania. Founded in 2019 by the musician Brandon Valentine, the organization recognizes the music history of Central Pennsylvania and honors musicians from the region. It also focuses on youth music education and presents the annual Central Pennsylvania Music Awards. The organization's multi-room museum opened in 2023, featuring plaques for all Hall of Fame inductees as well as autographed albums and guitars from Central Pennsylvania artists. The Central Pennsylvania Music Hall of Fame has inducted over 40 musicians and bands.

== History ==
The Central Pennsylvania Music Hall of Fame was founded in 2019 by Brandon Valentine, a musician and graduate of Lebanon Valley College. The nonprofit organization recognizes the music history of Central Pennsylvania and honors musicians from the region. In 2023, it opened a multi-room museum in Hummelstown, Pennsylvania, displaying plaques for all Hall of Fame inductees as well as autographed albums and guitars from Central Pennsylvania artists, including Bret Michaels and Taylor Swift.

The organization also presents the Central Pennsylvania Music Awards (CPMAs), held annually alongside the Hall of Fame induction ceremony. Described by local media as the "local Grammys", the CPMAs include more than 40 categories recognizing musicians, bands, venues, studios, photographers, radio programs, podcasts, and others. The organization held its first Central Pennsylvania Music Awards and Hall of Fame induction ceremony in 2020 at the Whitaker Center for Science and the Arts in Harrisburg, Pennsylvania.

The organization also focuses on youth music education. Its initiatives include the Youth Music Showcase, the Central Pennsylvania Youth All-Star Band, and music education camps teaching ukulele and bucket drumming. The Youth Music Showcase presents performances by artists and bands aged 18 or younger. First held in 2022 at The Englewood in Hershey, Pennsylvania, the showcase has since taken place at Lebanon Valley College and Millersville University. The Central Pennsylvania Youth All-Star Band has recorded and released cover versions of popular songs. The organization also produces the radio program The Local Show on The River 97.3—hosted by Valentine and Glenn Hamilton—which spotlights Central Pennsylvania artists and bands, as well as the Central Pennsylvania Music Podcast, a talk-show-style podcast featuring music and media guests.

== Inductees ==
The Hall of Fame Selection Committee holds an annual election to choose inductees. It consists of seven members from the organization's board of directors or advisory board, as well as three annually changing at-large members from the Central Pennsylvania music community. Eligible nominees include active, retired, or deceased musicians, bands, and music-related entities that have influenced the local or regional music scene. Nominees must have a significant connection to Central Pennsylvania and must have been active for at least ten years. The committee evaluates nominees according to their "resume/legacy, skill, musicianship, integrity, character, and contributions to the local/regional/national music scene".

=== 2020 ===
- Dan Hartman
- The Magnificent Men
- Poison
- The Sharks
- Bobby Troup
- Robert White

=== 2021 ===
- The Badlees
- Jimmy Dorsey
- Tommy Dorsey
- Jeffrey Gaines
- Halestorm
- Pentagon

=== 2022 ===
- Les Brown
- The Del McCoury Band
- The Emperors
- Live
- Bret Michaels
- The Pixies Three
- Third Stream

=== 2023 ===
- Breaking Benjamin
- The Buoys
- The Legends
- The Maxwell Project
- The Quin-Tones
- Steve Rudolph

=== 2024 ===
- Blitz Dynette
- Vince DiCola
- Fuel
- Hybrid Ice
- Fred Waring

=== 2025 ===
- August Burns Red
- Anita Humes
- The Innocence Mission
- The Jordan Brothers
- Mike Reid
- Soulville All-Stars

=== 2026 ===
- The Couriers
- Bill Fisher
- Martie Maguire
- The Ocean Blue
- Eddie Rambeau

=== 2027 ===
- Taylor Swift
