= Valencia Ballroom =

Dance hall in York, Pennsylvania

Coordinates: 39.9648°N 76.7295°W

The Valencia Ballroom is a historic venue located at 142 North George Street in downtown York, Pennsylvania. Built in 1911 as the Coliseum, it became a renowned swing dance hall in the 1930s, hosting legendary big band artists like Frank Sinatra, Glenn Miller, and Tommy Dorsey during the Swing era. One of the few surviving ballrooms from that period, it remains a cultural landmark, now used for private and public events.

== History ==
Constructed in 1911, the building originally known as the Coliseum served as a lecture hall and performance space in York’s downtown. After World War I, it hosted sports like basketball and wrestling. Peter Tassia, a local businessman from a family-owned grocery distribution company, acquired the building in 1928. Initially considered for cold storage, the Tassia family shifted plans in 1929 to book national music acts. The first event, a student hop with the Blue Moon Orchestra, took place on May 2, 1929.

In 1931, the venue introduced air conditioning, a pioneering feature believed to make it America’s first air-conditioned ballroom. Its growing popularity prompted an expansion and new facade—the Spanish-inspired brick front the building displays today—in 1934, designed by architect Harry R. Lenker. It reopened in October 1934 with a performance by Mal Hallett’s orchestra. Further expansions followed in 1937. From the 1940s to the mid-1970s, the Valencia thrived, benefiting from York’s location along Route 30, which made it a stop for touring bands. The Tassia family also ran a nearby radio station, broadcasting live performances.

In 1939, the Valencia celebrated its 10th anniversary with a book, “Valencia, York, PA. 10th Year Anniversary 1929-1939,” documenting bands, performance dates, and photographs. The venue closed to the public in the mid-1970s, ending the Tassia family’s operation. York’s Dutch Club then used it as their headquarters for about 15 years. Later operators included Kinsley Construction and Altland House, with the Rockfish Hospitality Group managing it today.

== Architecture ==
The Valencia Ballroom features a 260-by-60-foot hall with a rare spring-leveled maple dance floor equipped with shock-absorbing springs, one of only a few in the United States. Its interior showcases fourteen murals depicting landscapes from Spain’s Valencia region, reflecting its namesake. The exterior has a stainless-steel marquee with neon lighting, adding Art Deco flair. These elements, along with its early air conditioning, made it a standout venue.

== Notable performances ==
During the 1930s and 1940s, the Valencia hosted prominent big band artists, including Frank Sinatra, Glenn Miller, Tommy Dorsey, Benny Goodman, Artie Shaw, Count Basie, Kay Kyser, Les Brown, Buddy Rich, Duke Ellington, Woody Herman, Guy Lombardo, Jimmy Lunceford, Jack Teagarden, Paul Whiteman, Cab Calloway, Sammy Kaye, Hal Kemp, Ozzie Nelson, and Bob Crosby. Tommy Dorsey performed six times, Duke Ellington once, and the local Blue Moon Orchestra 649 times. On March 3, 1939, Kay Kyser drew a record 2,500 fans.

The venue also reflected the era’s racial tensions. While it welcomed Black musicians, they faced discrimination in York. In 1941, two Black members of Gene Krupa’s band were denied service at a nearby eatery after performing, prompting Krupa’s protest. Beyond music, the Valencia hosted industrial expositions, business shows, and fashion shows.

In 2017, York's Unforgettable Big Band hosted the "Big Swing Thing," an event aimed at reviving the swing era and returning the Valencia to a hub of dancing. Then-director of the band Thomas "Thom" McLaughlin planned and executed the event annually until his unexpected passing in November 2021. In 2026, the band, under the direction of Lindy Mack, hosted a program on the eve of the Semiquincentennial called "Freedom Is Not Free": A Celebration of the York Community and America's 250th. The event was co-chaired by lead male vocalist Jim Scofield and Assistant Director Michael Kirk, and drew over 450 attendees. All profits were donated back toward local veterans and first responder charities, including Pennsylvania Wounded Warriors, Wreaths Across America, and Gold Star Mothers.

== Current status ==
Managed by the Rockfish Hospitality Group, the Valencia Ballroom hosts weddings, corporate events, and community gatherings. Recent events include the Valencia Supper Club, featuring curated menus, and the York City Cocktail Competition, supporting local bartenders. Its continued use ensures the preservation of its historic legacy.
