= All in Time (film) =

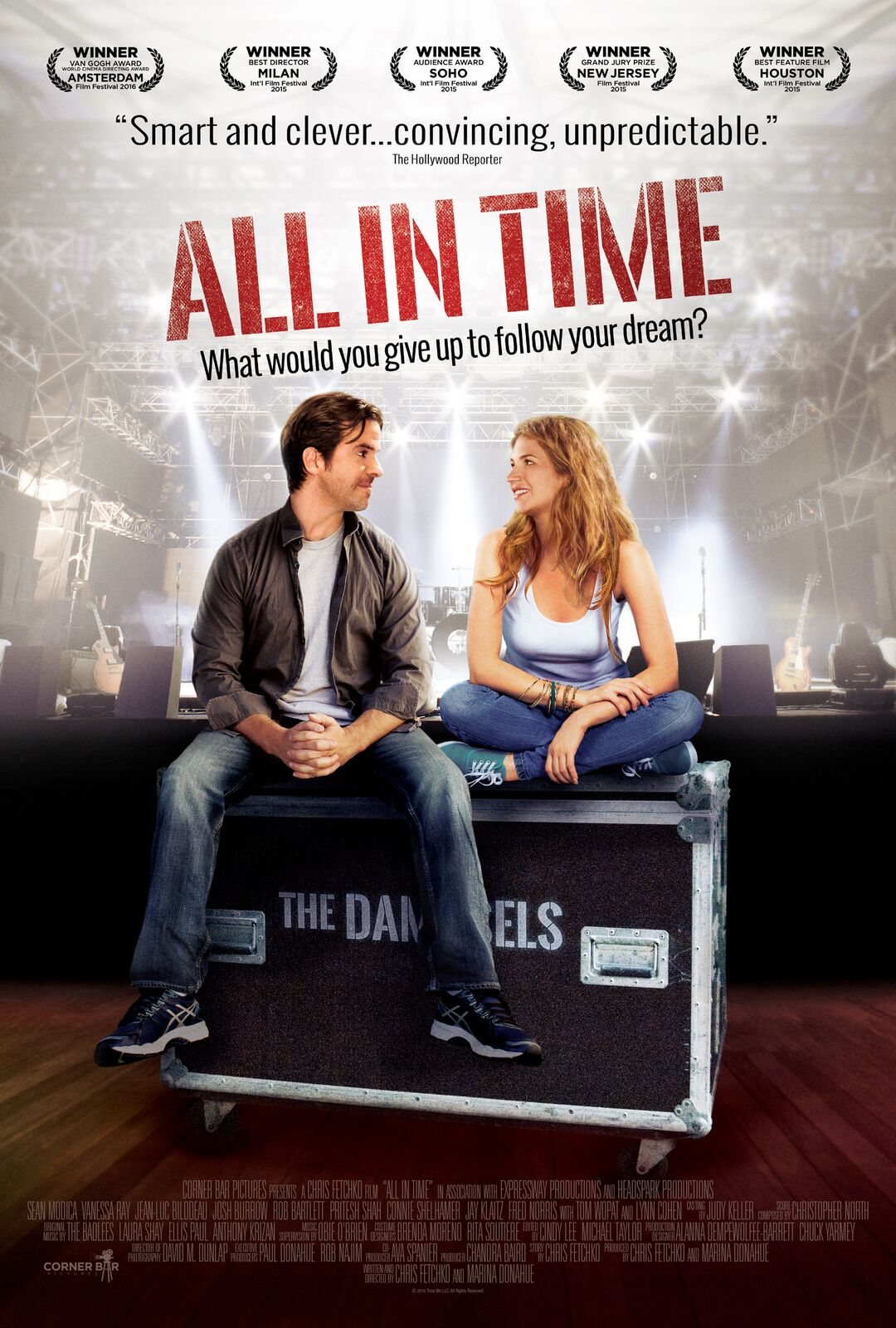
- Directed by: Chris Fetchko
- Written by: Marina Donahue; Chris Fetchko
- Story by: Chris Fetchko
- Produced by: Marina Donahue; Chris Fetchko
- Starring: Sean Modica; Lynn Cohen; Jean-Luc Bilodeau; Vanessa Ray
- Cinematography: David M. Dunlap
- Edited by: Cindy Lee; Alan Oxman; Michael Taylor
- Music by: Christopher North
- Production companies: Corner Bar Pictures; Headspark Productions; Expressway Productions; Chris Fetchko Productions
- Distributed by: TomCat Films
- Release dates: April 2015 (Festivals); October 7, 2015 (United States)
- Running time: 98 minutes
- Country: United States
- Language: English

All in Time is a 2015 romantic comedy film released domestically through Distribber and internationally through TomCat Films. The film marks the feature writing, producing and directorial collaboration of Marina Donahue, along with her producing/writing/directing partner Chris Fetchko. Aside from the film title referring to the passage of time, it is also a twist in the film. Stars include Lynn Cohen, Vanessa Ray and Jean-Luc Bilodeau.

== Premise ==
The film tells the story of a young couple named Charlie and Rachel, an intern (Clark) and their elderly neighbor, Mrs. Joshman. Music is treated like a character in this film. Elements of time travel are explored, as well as philosophical platitudes such as 'following your dream' and taking 'detours' in your life to see where they lead you. The film is a mix of drama, comedy, music and sci-fi.

== Cast ==
- Sean Modica as Charlie
- Lynn Cohen as Mrs. Joshnman
- Jean-Luc Bilodeau as Clark
- Vanessa Ray as Rachel
- Josh Burrow as Glen
- Jay Klaitz as Sam
- Tom Wopat as Dentist
- Pritesh Shah as Sameer
- Rob Bartlett as Rick
- Fred Norris as Rusty
- Connie Shelhamer as Lane
- Laura Shay as Laura
- Pete Palladino as Tracey
- Ron Simasek as Mark
- Rachel Donahue as Devon
- David DeCosmo as Charlie's father

== Production ==
Chris Fetchko was the manager for the rock group The Badlees and wrote a story based on his experience with Marina Donahue of Corner Bar Pictures. The collaboration led to the indie film winning numerous film festivals and premiering in New York with host Peter Travers of the New York Film Critics Series and Rolling Stone. All In Time was the debut feature film for Corner Bar Pictures.

== Production company ==
Corner Bar Pictures is an independent production company which deals with all project types from animation to feature-length films. Their emphasis is on projects in which the company is involved very early - typically at the writing phase - and extends through post-production. All in Time, a low-budget independent film, is their debut and won 12 festival awards prior to its release on the film festival circuit.

The director of photography, David M. Dunlap, shot the movie with two Arri Alexa digital cameras. Dunlap's other credits include Gossip Girl, House of Cards, and Shaun of the Dead.
