= Korean War Veterans Memorial =

U.S. national memorial in Washington, D.C.

- U.S. National Register of Historic Places
- U.S. National Memorial
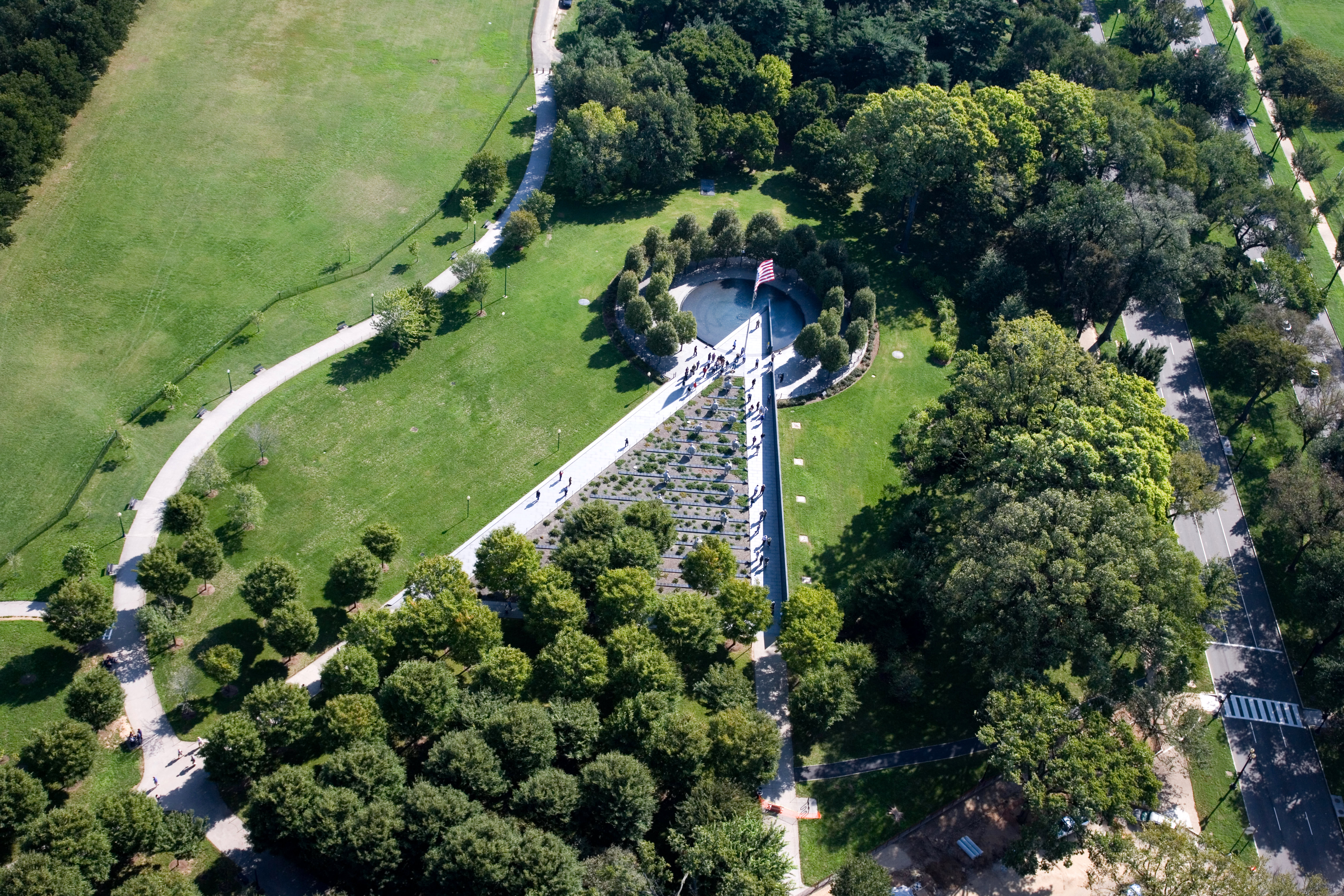
- Aerial view of the Korean War Veterans Memorial

- Location within Central Washington, D.C. Location within the District of Columbia Location within the United States
- Location: SE of Lincoln Memorial, off Independence Ave., Washington, D.C.
- Coordinates: 38°53′16″N 77°2′50″W
- Area: 2.20 acres (0.89 ha)
- Visitation: 3,975,010 (2025)
- Website: Korean War Veterans Memorial
- NRHP reference No.: 01000273
- Added to NRHP: July 27, 1995

The Korean War Veterans Memorial is located in Washington, D.C.'s West Potomac Park, southeast of the Lincoln Memorial and just south of the Reflecting Pool on the National Mall. It memorializes those who served in the Korean War (1950–1953). The national memorial was dedicated in 1995. It includes 19 statues representing U.S. military personnel in action. In 2022, the memorial was expanded to include a granite memorial wall, engraved with the names of U.S. military personnel (and South Koreans embedded in U.S. military units) who died in the war.

== History ==
The Korean War Veterans Memorial was confirmed by the U.S. Congress (Public Law 99-572) on April 20, 1986, with design and construction managed by the Korean War Veterans Memorial Advisory Board and the American Battle Monuments Commission.

The initial design competition was won in 1986 by a team of four architects and landscape architects from Pennsylvania State University, but this team withdrew as it became clear that changes would be needed to satisfy the advisory board and reviewing agencies such as the Commission of Fine Arts. A federal court case was filed and lost by the winning design team over the design changes. The eventual design was by Cooper-Lecky Architects who oversaw collaboration between several designers.

President George H. W. Bush conducted the groundbreaking for the Memorial on June 14, 1992, Flag Day. The companies and organizations involved in the construction are listed on the memorial as: the Faith Construction Company, the Emma Kollie Company, the Cold Spring Granite Company, the Tallix Art Foundry and the Baltimore District of the US Army Corps of Engineers. The memorial was dedicated on July 27, 1995, the 42nd anniversary of the armistice that ended the war, by President Bill Clinton and Kim Young Sam, the South Korean president, to the men and women who served during the conflict. Management of the national memorial was turned over to the National Park Service (NPS), under its National Mall and Memorial Parks group. As with all National Park Service historic areas, the memorial was listed on the National Register of Historic Places on the day of its dedication.

== Design and construction ==
=== The Mural Wall ===
The main memorial is in the form of a triangle intersecting a circle. Walls: 164 feet (50 m) long, 8 inches (200 mm) thick; more than 100 tons of highly polished "Academy Black" granite from California: more than 2,500 photographic, archival images representing the land, sea, and air troops who supported those who fought in the war are sandblasted onto the wall. The Mural was created by Louis Nelson, with photographic images sandblasted into it depicting soldiers, equipment and people involved in the war. When reflected on the wall, there appear to be 38 soldiers, 38 months, and it is also representing the 38th parallel that separated the North and South Korea.

=== The Column ===
Within the walled triangle are 19 stainless steel statues designed by Frank Gaylord and collectively called The Column. Each statue is larger than life-size, between 7 feet 3 inches (2.21 m) and 7 feet 6 inches (2.29 m) tall; each weighs nearly 1,000 pounds (500 kg). The figures represent a platoon on patrol, drawn from branches of the armed forces; fourteen of the figures are from the U.S. Army, three are from the Marine Corps, one is a Navy Corpsman, and one is an Air Force Forward Air Observer. They are dressed in full combat gear, dispersed among strips of granite and juniper bushes which represent the rugged terrain of Korea.

=== United Nations Wall ===
To the north of the statues and path is the United Nations Wall, a low wall listing the 22 member states of the United Nations (including the U.S. and South Korea) that, as part of the United Nations Command, contributed troops or provided medical support.

=== Pool of Remembrance ===
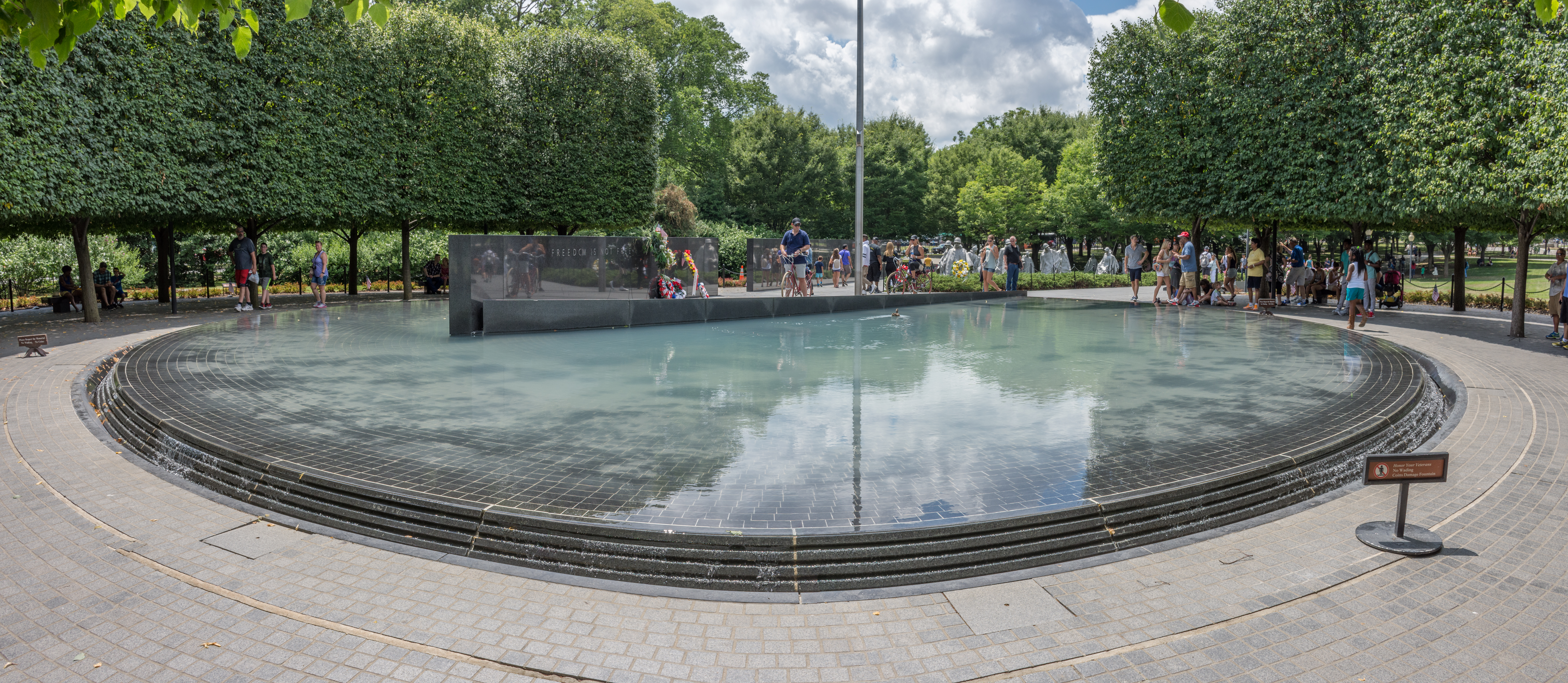
Pool of Remembrance

The circle contains the Pool of Remembrance, a shallow pool 30 feet (9 m) in diameter lined with black granite and surrounded by a grove of linden trees with benches. The trees are shaped to create a barrel effect, which allows sunlight to reflect on the pool. Inscriptions list the numbers killed, wounded, missing in action, and held as prisoners of war, and a nearby plaque is inscribed: "Our nation honors her sons and daughters who answered the call to defend a country they never knew and a people they never met." Additionally, right next to the numbers of American soldiers are those of the United Nations troops in the same categories. In the south side of the memorial, there are three bushes of the Rose of Sharon hibiscus plant, South Korea's national flower.

A further granite wall bears the simple message, inlaid in silver: "Freedom Is Not Free."

=== Wall of Remembrance ===
Around 2010, the Korean War Veterans Memorial Foundation (KWVMF) began to lobby Congress to add to the existing memorial a wall listing the names of U.S. servicemembers who died in the Korean War. The NPS opposed the proposal; the director of the NPS capital region testified before a House committee that "As the Vietnam Veterans Memorial experience showed, there is not always agreement on those names to be included and those names that are not, and this has led to public contention and controversy, ... Choosing some names and omitting others causes a place of solace to become a source of hurt." In 2016 Congress passed the Korean War Veterans Memorial Wall of Remembrance Act; the act requires the NPS to work with the KWVMF to add a "list of names of members of the Armed Forces of the United States who died in the Korean War, as determined by the Secretary of Defense."

In 2021, portions of the memorial were closed for construction of the Wall of Remembrance and simultaneous rehabilitation work on the rest of the memorial. In summer 2022, the Wall of Remembrance, a series of long black granite slabs, was unveiled at a re-dedication ceremony. The ceremony took place on July 27, 2022, the 69th anniversary of the Armistice.

The wall lists the names of 36,634 Americans, along with 7,174 South Koreans who died under U.S. command while serving in the Korean Augmentation To the United States Army (KATUSA). The Wall cost $22 million to design and construct, funded mostly by the South Korean government, Ministry of Patriots and Veterans Affairs. Names of those killed are listed in order of branch and rank. Due to errors in the list submitted by the Defense Department in 2021, the Wall of Remembrance contains many mistakes: it is estimated to include 1,015 spelling errors (for example, the name of posthumous Medal of Honor recipient John Kelvin Koelsch is misspelled) and also lists 245 servicemembers who died in circumstances unrelated to the Korean War. The Wall also omits about 500 names that should be listed. For example, one bomber crash killed nine crew members aboard, but only three names are included on the wall. In another case, a Navy pilot and an Air Force pilot were killed off Japan after their aircraft collided with each other; only one of the two pilots is listed on the wall.

On 11 January 2023, South Korean Ministry of Patriots and Veterans Affairs announced their intent to perform list verifications and corrections in the near future.

== Korean War Veterans Memorial Foundation's Maintenance Fund ==
On October 12, 2015, Samsung Electronics donated $1 million to the Korean War Memorial Foundation. The memorial used the donation for maintenance. According to William Weber, the chairman of the memorial foundation, "Most of the grouting need to be treated twice a year. And there isn't enough for all of that upkeep." In addition, on October 16, Samsung helped clean the memorial ground as part of the company's national day of service.

== Troop statistics ==
Engraved on granite blocks near the water pool at the east end of the monument are the casualty statistics for the soldiers who fought in the war.

- Dead—United States:
  - 54,246 (as of 2021, Worldwide - Korea Theater: 36,574, Non-Korea Theater: 17,672),
  - Revised 36,574 (as of 2021, Only in Korea Theater: Battle Deaths: 33,739, Other Deaths: 2,835)
  - Revised 36,634 (as of July 2022, Only in Korea Theater), United Nations: 4,216 (Corrected)
- Wounded—United States: 103,284, United Nations: 11,297 (Corrected)
- Captured United States: 7,140, United Nations: 1,367 (Corrected)
- Missing— United States: 8,177, United Nations: 1,801 (Corrected)

== United States postage stamp court case ==
The unveiling of the stamp at the center of Frank Gaylord's intellectual-property dispute.

On February 25, 2010, the United States Court of Appeals for the Federal Circuit ruled on appeal that the memorial-sculptor Frank Gaylord was entitled to compensation for a 37-cent postage stamp—which used an image of the sculpture—because he had not signed away his intellectual property rights to the sculpture when it was erected. The appeals court rejected arguments that the photo was transformative.

In 2002, amateur photographer and retired Marine John Alli was paid $1,500 for the use of one of his photographs of the memorial on a snowy day for the stamp, which sold more than $17 million worth of stamps. In 2006, sculptor Frank Gaylord enlisted Fish & Richardson to make a claim that the Postal Service had violated his intellectual property rights to the sculpture and therefore he should have been compensated. The Postal Service argued that Gaylord was not the sole sculptor (saying he had received advice from federal sources, who recommended that the uniforms appear more in the wind) and also that the sculpture was actually architecture. Gaylord won all of his arguments in the lower court except for one—the court ruled the photo was fair use and thus he was not entitled to compensation. Gaylord challenged the fair-use ruling and won the case on appeal.

Gaylord had sought compensation of 10 percent of the sales. Gaylord's original commission was $775,000. On April 22, 2011, the US Court of Federal Claims awarded Gaylord $5,000. On appeal, the US Court of Appeals for the Federal Circuit vacated the order and remanded the case back to the US Court of Federal Claims. On September 20, 2013, the US Court of Federal Claims awarded Gaylord $684,844.94 in damages, including interest.

== See also ==
- United States in the Korean War
- List of Korean War memorials
- List of national memorials of the United States
- Iron Mike
- List of public art in Washington, D.C., Ward 2
- Architecture of Washington, D.C.

== General bibliography ==
- Korean War Vererans Memorial, National Park Service leaflet, GPO:2204—304-337/00178
- The National Parks: Index 2001–2003. Washington: U.S. Department of the Interior.
