= The Day's Parade =

EP by The Badlees
- Released: July 1998
- Recorded: Bret Alexander's Basement Studio; Wapwallopen, PA
- Length: 20:31
- Label: Rite-Off Records
- Producer: Bret Alexander

The Badlees chronology
River Songs (1995)	The Day's Parade (1998)	Amazing Grace (1999)

The Day's Parade is a five-song EP by American band The Badlees, released on their independent label, Rite-Off Records, in July 1998 when they were in "corporate limbo" due to the sale of Polygram to Seagram's corporation earlier in 1998.

== Background ==
Unsure about their fate on a national label, yet unable to affirmatively do much to further their career on that front, The Badlees decided to produce a short new EP of "unplugged" songs that were recorded in Bret Alexander's home basement studio.

Although The Day's Parade fell far short of the bands goal of releasing a new "album", it was the first new published material from the Badlees in nearly three and a half years. It featured simple, mainly-acoustic arrangements and a definite "live" feel and was fueled by various combinations of acoustic guitar, banjo, mandolin, and just a tad of electric guitar lead from Alexander and Jeff Feltenberger, along with minimal rhythm from drummer Ron Simasek and bassist Paul Smith and well-represented harmonica and lead vocals from Pete Palladino.

The five-song EP was bookmarked by two new originals, written by Bret Alexander and songwriting collaborator Mike Naydock, the upbeat opener "Leaning on the Days Parade" and the waltz-like ballad "90% of the Time", with some interesting wah-wah laced guitar leads, as a closer. The other three songs on The Day's Parade are remakes, two of which were updated versions of older Badlees tunes, with the third being an intense, upbeat version of Bruce Springsteen's "Atlantic City", sung by Alexander and, to date, the only true "cover" in the Badlees band catalog. The two updated songs came from the Badlees first two releases, "Last Great Act of Defiance" from the It Ain't For You EP and an excellent, banjo-based version of "Diamonds in the Coal" from the LP of the same name.

The Day's Parade was released on the independent Rite-Off Records, just as those early recordings had been, in July 1998. But its unplanned, quick recording and nearly instantaneous release tended to confuse many loyal Badlees fans and critics alike. They were strongly anticipating a full-length, major label release from the band and didn’t understand the corporate mess that was causing its delay.

== Track listing ==
Note – the order listed below is from the original Rite-Off Records release of February, 1995.

No.	Title	Music	Length
1.	"Leaning on the Day's Parade"	Alexander, Naydock	2:40
2.	"Diamonds in the Coal"	Alexander	4:29
3.	"Atlantic City"	Springsteen	3:35
4.	"Last Great Act of Defiance"	Alexander, Naydock	3:45
5.	"90% of the Time"	Naydock	5:42

== Personnel ==
- Pete Palladino – Vocals, Harmonica
- Bret Alexander – Acoustic & Electric Guitar, Dobro, Banjo, Mandolin, Dulcimer, Vocals
- Jeff Feltenberger – Acoustic Guitar, Mandolin, Vocals
- Paul Smith – Bass, Keyboards, Vocals
- Ron Simasek – "Small" Drums, Percussion
