= Renew (album) =

Studio album by The Badlees
- Released: June 2002
- Recorded: Saturation Acres Recording Studio
- Length: 34:34
- Label: S.A.M. Records
- Producer: Bret Alexander and Paul Smith

The Badlees chronology
Up There, Down Here (1999)	Renew (2002)	Love Is Rain (2009)

Renew is the sixth full-length studio album released by American band The Badlees. It was released on S.A.M. Records in June 2002 and was the first new album by the band in three years.

== Background ==
Following the departure of longtime manager Terry Selders the beginning of 2000, The Badlees had a bit of inner turmoil and various members of the band focused on "side" projects, rather than anything new by the band. In early 2002, a charitable event would provide the perfect opportunity for The Badlees to come back together and make music once again as a band. Karen Greenberg Revit was a friend of band who died of leukemia in 1998, at the young age of 33. Soon thereafter, a benefit concert was held in her honor, which had since become an annual event. In 2002, Concert for Karen IV was organized and the Badlees decided to do something special.

The band got together at Saturation Acres for this cause that they believed in and recorded four songs for an EP to be released in conjunction with the live event. At first, they were unsure if some of their recent differences would be an impediment to this goal, but within fifteen minutes of playing, they all felt at home with each other. As vocalist Pete Palladino put it at the time; "I think everybody at that point had just let it all go. All of those hang-ups and baggage that we carried around from all of those years were let go, and we just accepted each other -.and it was a great feeling."

The band decided to go on and make a full album, which was released in June, 2002, and marked the return of the Badlees to what made them famous in the first place. Most of the songs are written by Bret Alexander and all are sung by Palladino. The sound itself on Renew is less layered and more evenly patterned than on its predecessors Amazing Grace or Up There, Down Here. the title song, "Renew", was the very first song written for this initiative and served as a fitting theme for that point in their career. It sets the tone for the reflective and introspective feel of this record, getting its movement from Pete's vocal progression from controlled and moody to joyous. "See Me As a Picture", speaks to the sensation of being idolized or "set as picture in your mind". It is an exquisite poem about letting people grow and change with time and experience and contains its share of interesting instrumentation with a heavy presence of organ, synths, and wah-wah-ed guitar.

The band gives its own roots rock and Americana influences a nod in the songs "You Can't Go Home Again" and "Done For Love", each with a fair share steel guitars, banjos and country twang. Jeff Feltenberger contributed one song with the rocker "I Don’t Believe In You", while Mike Naydock's only contribution was actually written back in 1997, "Once In a While", a fine, steady pop song with interesting changes, layered vocals, and a bluesy guitar lead.

"Too Many Changes" is the standout song on this album. A soft and simple riff is the backdrop for dynamic vocals that rise from being measured and controlled to wailing and forceful. The song is also a showcase for each of the musicians as it gradually builds with new, rich layers of sonic candy and sound effects, all to a marching rhythm.

To support Renew, the band decided to try something new - a television special. They filmed a special show at the Grand Ballroom of the Manhattan Center in New York City in July 2002, playing a healthy mix of new songs off their album with favorites of the past. The show was titled Renew and Rewind and aired on a local Pennsylvania television in late August. Despite this new initiative, and some healthy airplay of the title song, Renew followed much the same path as the various side projects a year earlier – critically acclaimed, but commercially weak.

== Track listing ==
No.	Title	Music	Length
1.	"Renew"	Alexander, Badlees	3:40
2.	"Hindsightseeing"	Alexander, Badlees	3:46
3.	"Four Leaf Clover"	Alexander, Badlees	3:59
4.	"Too Many Changes"	Alexander, Badlees	4:56
5.	"Done For Love"	Alexander, Badlees	3:13
6.	"These Are the People Who Own the World"	Alexander	4:00
7.	"See Me As a Picture"	Alexander, Badlees	2:45
8.	"I Don't Believe In You"	Alexander, Badlees	2:53
9.	"A Fever"	Alexander, Naydock, Badlees	2:59
10.	"You Can't Go Home Again"	Alexander, Badlees	2:23

== Personnel ==
The Badlees

- Pete Palladino – Lead Vocals, Harp
- Bret Alexander – Electric Guitar, Synths, Dobro, Rhodes Piano
- Jeff Feltenberger – Acoustic & Electric Guitars, Background Vocals
- Paul Smith – Bass, Synths, Programming
- Ron Simasek – Drums, Percussion

Additional Musicians

- Bob Scott - Hammond B-3 on "Hindsightseeing" and "Four Leaf Clover"
- Chris Novak - Piano on "Done for Love" and "These Are the People Who Own the World"

Production

- Bret Alexander, Paul Smith - Producers & Engineers
- Bob Reicherter - Executive Producer
- Pete Palladino - Layout & Design
- Chris Fetchko - Manager, Fetch Co Management
