= Hybrid Ice (album) =

Studio album by Hybrid Ice
- Released: 1982
- Studio: Susquehanna Sound Studios
- Genre: Rock
- Label: A Street Records
- Producer: John Palumbo

Hybrid Ice chronology
Hybrid Ice (1982)	No Rules (1988)

Hybrid Ice is the debut album from the Pennsylvania-based rock band Hybrid Ice, released in 1982. Although not released on a major label, the album reached No. 5 on regional album charts in the US. It contains the hit song "Magdelene," which received much radio play and was later covered in 1994 by Boston on their album Walk On.

In 1984, Boston had asked to record Magdelene for what would later become their Third Stage album, Hybrid Ice agreed to stop sales of their own album. But the song didn't make it to a Boston album until 1994. Six years later, in 2000, Hybrid Ice signed a deal with Escape Records of England, and re-released the album (with Magdelene) on compact disc.

== Track listing ==
All songs: lyrics and music by Rusty Foulke, copyright 1982, except "Castle Walls", (lyrics and music by Robert Scott Richardson), copyright 1982, "Looking Glass" (lyrics and music by Robert Scott Richardson, copyright 1998) and "Test of Time" (lyrics and music by Rusty Foulke, copyright 1998).

=== Original release ===
1. "On We Go" – 3:44
2. "Think it Over" – 3:50
3. "Magdelene" – 3:39
4. "Wounded" – 3:01
5. "Rock and Roll Forever" – 4:28
6. "Castle Walls" – 5:33
7. "Heart of the Night" – 3:52
8. "Please Tell Maryann" – 3:16
9. "Do You Believe in Rock N Roll" – 3:51

=== 2000 Re-release ===
1. "Looking Glass" – 4:49
2. "On We Go" – 3:44
3. "Think it Over" – 3:50
4. "Magdelene" – 3:39
5. "Wounded" – 3:01
6. "Rock and Roll Forever" – 4:28
7. "Castle Walls" – 5:33
8. "Heart of the Night" – 3:52
9. "Please Tell Maryann" – 3:16
10. "Do You Believe in Rock N Roll" – 3:51
11. "Test of Time" – 4:06

== Personnel ==
- Robert Scott Richardson – vocals, keyboards, bass, drums
- Chris Alburger – vocals, guitar
- Rick Klinger – vocals, drums
- Jeff Willoughby – vocals, bass
- Bernie Garzio – vocals, bass
- Rusty Foulke – vocals, lead guitar

== Production ==
- Producer: John Palumbo
- Engineer: Victor Giordano
- Mixers: Bob Spangler, Rusty Foulke
- Studio assistants: Dexter Kunkle, Keith Hummel, Mickey Tarone, Paul Vanderbeck
