= Shawn Z. =

American musician

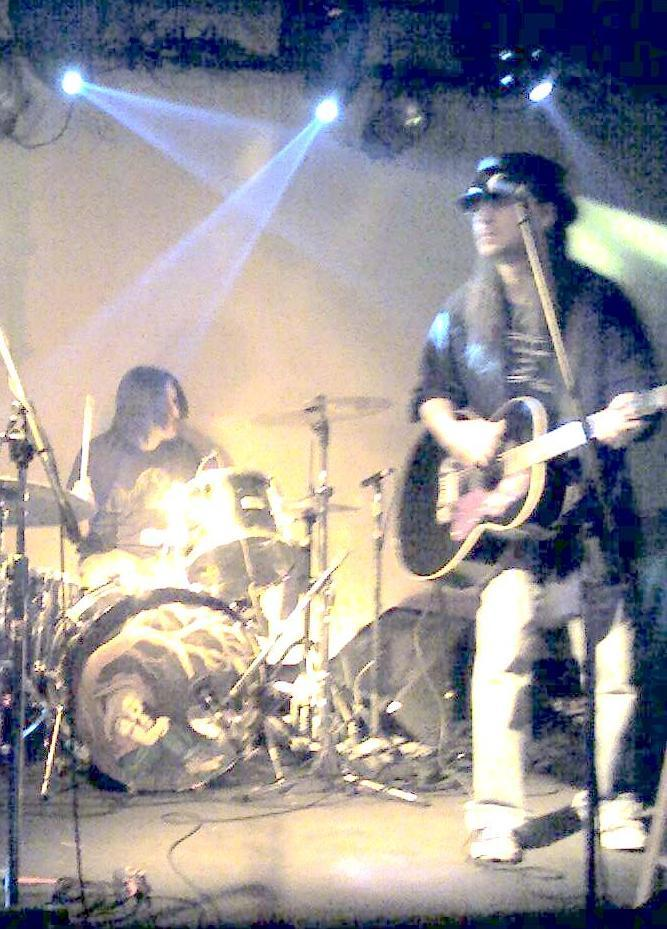
- Shawn Z. (right) performing live on May 13, 2008.

Background information
- Genres: Americana, alternative country, outlaw country, roots rock, folk rock
- Occupations: Singer, songwriter
- Instruments: vocals, acoustic guitar
- Label: GypZee

Shawn Z. is an American folk rock/Americana singer and guitarist. He is a member of the Americana Music Association.

== Early years ==
Shawn had a band called "Elmo Lincoln", later called "South 40", that played local bars and clubs. He later formed the band "BFD" with his father, and later "The Cojones Brothers" – an acoustic duo.

== Radio ==
In Shawn's teenage years, he first DJed at a local teen center after school and on weekend nights, and embarked on a career as a DJ.

Years later, the radio station he was working was bought out by the national corporate radio company Citadel Broadcasting. Citadel moved him to their Northeast Pennsylvania headquarters to help with current station buyouts, format changes, on-air duties, and commercial/imaging production.

In January 2008, he was asked to come back to the same radio studios that once was the home of the station that brought Shawn to Citadel.

He is still active in radio with the reservation radio station and voice-tracking for stations.

== Musical career ==
In October 2004, Shawn recorded with old friends Bret Alexander, Paul Smith and Ron Simasek from "The Badlees".

In Bret's studio "Saturation Acres" they recorded nine songs which became Shawn's debut independent release "Wishful Drinkin'" released in January 2005.

Wishful Drinkin' reached No. 11 while on the Americana charts for 14 weeks.

At the beginning of 2008, Shawn and the band went back into the studio. This time, he had friend and former WEMR general manager Jim Petrie as a co-writer on many of the songs recorded. They named this recording Saint Jude Avenue, which was released Sept. 2008 with singles "Poison Water", "Half Baked" and "Uncle Willie".

== Discography ==
=== Albums ===
- Wishful Drinkin' (2005)
- Saint Jude Avenue (2008)

=== Singles ===
- Wishful Drinkin' (2005)
- Talking Cover Band Blues (2005)
- Hey Judge Judy (2005)
- Been Down (2005)
- Poison Water (2008)
- Half Baked (2008)
- Uncle Willie (2008)
- Summertime Blues (2010)
