= Up There Down Here =

Up There, Down Here

Studio album by the Badlees
- Released: August 24, 1999
- Recorded: Bearsville Recording Studio; Bearsville, NY
- Length: 39:09
- Label: Ark 21
- Producers: Joe Alexander and the Badlees

The Badlees chronology
Amazing Grace (1999)	Up There, Down Here (1999)	Renew (2002)

Up There, Down Here was the fifth studio album released by American band the Badlees. It was due to be released on the Polydor label but was delayed by the merger of Polygram and Seagram to form the new Universal Music Group in 1998. The Badlees were dropped by Universal and the album was eventually released in August 1999 on the Ark 21 label.

== Background ==
The Badlees recorded Up There, Down Here as a follow-up to their album River Songs in 1997. It was originally due to be released for the Christmas season of that year, but all projects were put on hold owing to delays by Polydor and the company's takeover by Seagram. In the final months of 1998 and into 1999, the band demanded that the label either release Up There, Down Here or release the Badlees from their contract, but without success.

The Badlees, frustrated, independently recorded a new album, Amazing Grace. This was not well received by the new Universal Music Group, and the band members suspected that it might jeopardize the release of Up There, Down Here, as Universal owned the rights to the recording. They were proved correct, and The Badlees were dropped from the new label on the day that Amazing Grace was released.

The band's manager, Terry Selders, brought in attorney and agent Larry Mazer to try to move the band to another label. Selders contacted John Rotella, who had worked at Polydor when the Badlees were signed and was himself affected by the Seagram's takeover. Rotella was now with a label called Ark 21, owned by Miles Copeland III, who had previously been successful with I.R.S. Records, and through the joint efforts of Selders, Mazer, and Rotella, Ark 21 was able to retrieve the rights for Up There, Down Here from Universal. By May 1999 a deal was in place, and the album that the band had prepared for and worked on for nearly four years was finally released on August 24, 1999.

The Badlees were ready to tour nationally in support of the album, as they had for River Songs, but Ark 21 was by then on its way to bankruptcy, and the label was unable to give the band the support necessary for touring, merchandising or licensing. Selders became so frustrated with this that he flew to the record company offices and manned the phones himself, to try to arrange licensing deals for songs from Up There, Down Here. He had some success, getting a song on to the new Warner Brothers TV show Odd Man Out, and another into the film Boys and Girls. The Badlees left Ark 21 and returned to being an independent band.

== Track listing ==
No.	Title	Music	Length
1.	"Don't Let Me Hide"	Bret Alexander, The Badlees	4:37
2.	"Luther's Window"		3:56
3.	"Thinking in Ways"		4:52
4.	"Which One of You"		4:23
5.	"Little Hell"		3:19
6.	"34 Winters"	Jeff Feltenberger	4:55
7.	"Middle of the Busiest Road"		4:50
8.	"Cellarbird & Zither"	Alexander	0:48
9.	"Running Up That Hill"		4:27
10.	"Love All"		3:08
11.	"Silly Little Man"		4:18
12.	"The Second Coming of Chris"		4:36
13.	"A Little Faith"		7:31

== Personnel ==
The Badlees

- Pete Palladino – Vocals, Harmonica
- Bret Alexander – Guitars, Mandolin, Dobro, Dulcimer, Banjo, Vocals
- Jeff Feltenberger – Guitars, Vocals
- Paul Smith – Bass, Keyboards, Vocals
- Ron Simasek – Drums, Percussion

Additional Musicians

- Robert Scott Richardson - Hammond B-3, Piano

Production

- Joe Alexander - Producer
- Bret Alexander, Paul Smith - Engineers
- Pete Palladino - Layout & Design
- Terry Selders - Manager
- Scott Berger - Tour Manager
- Keith Barshinger - House Engineer
