= Love Is Rain =

Studio album by The Badlees
- Released: October 6, 2009
- Recorded: Saturation Acres Recording Studio
- Length: 53:10
- Label: S.A.M. Records
- Producer: Bret Alexander

The Badlees chronology
Renew (2002)	Love Is Rain (2009)	Epiphones and Empty Rooms (2013)

Love Is Rain is the seventh full-length studio album released by American band The Badlees. It was released on S.A.M. Records on October 6, 2009, the band's first new album in over seven years.

== Track listing ==
No.	Title	Music	Length
1.	"Peter Pan"	Alexander, Badlees	3:28
2.	"Star to Fall"	Alexander, Badlees	4:02
3.	"Anodyne"	Alexander, Naydock, Badlees	4:57
4.	"Don't Ever Let Me Down"	Alexander, Badlees	3:59
5.	"Well Laid Plans"	Alexander, Naydock, Badlees	3:13
6.	"Drive Back Home"	Alexander, Badlees	4:40
7.	"Radio at Night"	Alexander, Naydock, Badlees	3:46
8.	"Part of a Rainbow"	Alexander, Badlees	4:34
9.	"We Will"	Alexander, Badlees	4:10
10.	"Way Back Home"	Alexander, Badlees	4:18
11.	"Starthrower"	Alexander, Badlees	3:53
12.	"Two States"	Alexander	5:19
13.	"All Right Now"	Alexander, Badlees	2:51

== Personnel ==
The Badlees

- Bret Alexander – Guitars, Keys, Vocals
- Pete Palladino – Vocals
- Paul Smith – Bass, Keys, Vocals
- Ron Simasek – Drums, Percussion

Additional Musicians

- Jeff Feltenberger - Backing Vocals
- Aaron Fink - Guitar on "Part of a Rainbow"
- Nick Van Wyke - Violin on "We Will"

Production

- Bret Alexander - Producer, Engineer
- Chris Gradner - Executive Producer
- Paul Smith - Engineer
- Pete Palladino - Layout & Design
