= Amazing Grace (The Badlees album) =

Studio album by The Badlees
- Released: April 2, 1999
- Recorded: Bret Alexander's Basement Studio; Wapwallopen, PA
- Length: 39:09
- Label: Rite-Off Records
- Producer: Bret Alexander

The Badlees chronology
The Day's Parade (1995)	Amazing Grace (1999)	Up There, Down Here (1999)

Amazing Grace is the fourth full length studio album released by American band The Badlees. It was released on their independent label, Rite-Off Records, in April 1999, just as the band was working to get out of their contract with Universal.

== Background ==
The Badlees recorded their follow-up to the blockbuster River Songs in 1997. The album was called Up There, Down Here and was ready to be published, but the sale of Polygram to Seagram's put all projects on hold indefinitely. Over the final months of 1998 and into 1999, the Badlees played steadily to packed shows in and around Pennsylvania but made little headway with the label that continued to hold them in corporate limbo. They requested, then demanded, then begged the label to either release Up There, Down Here to the public, or release the Badlees from their contract, but got little to no response.

Amazing Grace

The band then decided to make their own fully produced, full-length album independently and without consent from the label. Bret Alexander was confident that his ever-growing home studio was to the point where they could accomplish this mission sonically. Terry Selders felt that this rash move by the band could not possibly be ignored by the folks at the new Universal Music Group, and was bound to cause some movement one way or another. The band members realized that this action would probably mean the death of Up There, Down Here, as Universal owned the rights to that recording.

The new album, Amazing Grace, was recorded, mixed, mastered, and pressed in just two months at Bret Alexander's home studio. It features the most diverse array of songwriting and voices, as well as styles and moods, and is testament to a true genius that the band possesses, that had been suppressed in recent years.

Including the already finished, but yet to be released, Up There, Down Here, Pete Palladino sang lead vocals on 56 of the 58 songs that the Badlees had published since 1990, but of the eleven tracks that made up Amazing Grace, Pete would only be the lead singer on four. However, Palladino had no individual songwriting credits on any of those previous recordings, but he did have one on this album, a pop gem which he co-wrote with Mike Naydock titled "A Fever", which contain soprano vocals in the hook and is reminiscent to some of the higher quality material put out by Tears For Fears in the 1980s.

Jeff Feltenberger wrote "Appalachian Scream", a blue-grass tinged, banjo-driven song on which he performs lead vocals for the first time since the days of Bad Lee White. Paul Smith sings lead vocals for the first time on any Badlees song, with the song "Ain't No Man", which has a "Roadhouse Blues" feel with a rolling musical interlude and features a heavy dose of piano and B3 organ by guest Robert Scott Richardson. This was one of two songs written by Smith for the album. The other, "Long Good Night", a fast-paced and catchy rocker, sung by Palladino, became a crowd favorite at shows and got some regional airplay.

The rest of Amazing Grace is a showcase for Bret Alexander, as a producer, as a performer, and, most especially, as a songwriter. He sings lead vocals on five of these tracks. The album is bookended by two more, Alexander-penned tracks. "I'm Not Here Anymore", which is sung by Palladino. The closing song, "In a Minor Way", is sung by Alexander and straddles the divide between punk and new wave and the guitar-driven pop of the 1960s, in much the same vein as Tom Petty did in the past and The Cellarbirds would in the near future.

Release

Amazing Grace was released on Rite-Off Records on April 2, 1999. The strategy to cause movement at Universal apparently worked, as the Badlees were dropped from the label on the very day that this album was released.

== Track listing ==
No.	Title	Music	Length
1.	"I'm Not Here Anymore"	Bret Alexander	4:32
2.	"Long Goodnight"	Smith	4:00
3.	"Poison Ivy"	Alexander	3:25
4.	"Ain't No Man"	Smith	3:05
5.	"Amazing Grace to You"	Alexander	4:34
6.	"Beyond These Walls"	Alexander, Naydock	2:43
7.	"Time Turns Around"	Alexander	2:53
8.	"Appalachian Scream"	Feltenberger, Yashinsky	3:37
9.	"A Fever"	Naydock, Palladino	4:56
10.	"Gone"	Alexander	2:13
11.	"In a Minor Way"	Alexander	3:21

== Personnel ==
=== The Badlees ===
- Pete Palladino – Vocals, Harmonica
- Bret Alexander – Guitar, Mandolin, Dobro, Dulcimer, Banjo, Vocals
- Jeff Feltenberger – Acoustic Guitar, Vocals
- Paul Smith – Bass, Keyboards, Vocals
- Ron Simasek – Drums, Percussion

=== Additional Musicians ===
- Robert Scott Richardson - Hammond B-3, Piano
- Dave Baratta - Pedal Steel on "Appalachian Scream"

=== Production ===
- Bret Alexander, Paul Smith - Producers & Engineers
- Tom Borthwick - Engineer at Sound Investments
- Pete Palladino - Photography & Design
- Terry Selders - Manager, One Louder Management
- Larry Mazer - Manager, Entertainment Services
- Scott Berger - Tour Manager
- Keith Barshinger - House Engineer
