= The Unfortunate Result of Spare Time =

Studio album by The Badlees
- Released: August 24, 1993
- Recorded: Susquehanna Sound; Northumberland, PA
- Length: 49:56
- Label: Sharkstooth Records
- Producer: Jack Pyers and The Badlees

The Badlees chronology
Diamonds in the Coal (1992)	The Unfortunate Result of Spare Time (1993)	River Songs (1995)

The Unfortunate Result of Spare Time is the second full-length album by Pennsylvania rock band The Badlees. It was approached in a unique way for the early-era recordings of the band. They brought in an outside producer, Jack Pyers (formally of the band Dirty Looks), and they all but abandoned their signature "roots rock" sound that was started on the previous album, Diamonds in the Coal, and would proliferate on their next album, 1995's River Songs.

== Background ==
The fact that the band remained unsigned to a major label after the release of Diamonds in the Coal through 1992 was quite a disappointment to Badlees members, some of whom still maintained "day jobs" and were enthusiastic that Diamonds would push the band over the top and garner some interest from the larger labels. By 1993, as the Badlees prepared to work on their second full-length album, they decided to take quite a different approach.

Jack Pyers had known the national spotlight, as bassist with the hard rock band Dirty Looks in the late 1980s, as that band was signed to Atlantic records and had modest success with a couple of hit albums and a video on rotation on MTV. After Pyers left the band in 1991, he went on to form Sharkstooth Records with some investors in the Scranton, Pennsylvania area. In early 1993, Pyers approached the Badlees about producing their next album, promising a sound that more accurately reflects the energy of their live shows. By this time, the band had already begun performing and developing new material on stage, and already had a new single, "Laundromat Radio" recorded for inclusion on the latest Album Network compilation. Ultimately, the band agreed to try a new approach and took most of the summer off from touring in order to concentrate on the new album. The resulting effort was called The Unfortunate Result of Spare Time, a title that the Badlees shrugged off as ironic at the time, but have since come to admit to its more literal meaning.

"Laugh to Keep from Cryin'" is a steady, building song with an excellent soundscape, while "She's the Woman" has a classic blues-driven hard rock sound with guitar riffs and harmonica by guest Daine Paul Russell of the Dr. Groove Band. The opening two songs – "A Better Way to Save the World" and "Me, Myself and I" – each experiment with song structure, while on the closer, "A Matter of Time", the band experiments with complex harmonies. "Tore Down Flat in Jackson" is, perhaps, the one song that really captures the original intent of the album, the raw, exciting "live" sound.

There is a definite expansion of Pete Palladino's vocal range and style than on previous recordings. Palladino also came up with the concept and played a part designing the cover and artwork of the album, which features a boy leaning against the doorjamb of a tenement. The kid was the son of a friend of Pete's named Jimmy Lee Burgess, and art designer is a role that Palladino would play on all future Badlee releases.

What is not present is the continuance of the Badlees "roots rock" development that was started with the debut EP and enhanced with the song "Diamonds in the Coal". There were also other elements that deviated from the foundation the Badlees had built through Diamonds. Being that most of material was written live, Mike Naydock played a smaller role on this album, only co-writing three songs. In fact, Alexander only took partial credit for one song, with the rest being credited to simply "The Badlees".

The album was also a costly enterprise, not only because they took off so much time from touring to produce it, but also because Pyers was paid for his services (in the role that Alexander usually filled himself) and the album was mixed at a top-notch studio, Dajhelon Recording, in Rochester, New York. The "unfortunate result" was that the album was not the great leap forward that the band had hoped for, but more like a "side step" (a term used by both Feltenberger and Selders in separate interviews).

== Track listing ==
No.	Title	Music	Length
1.	"A Better Way to Save the World"	The Badlees	3:55
2.	"Me, Myself, and I"	The Badlees	4:25
3.	"She's the Woman"	The Badlees	3:25
4.	"You're Not the Only One"	The Badlees	3:55
5.	"Laugh to Keep From Crying"	The Badlees	3:56
6.	"Laundromat Radio"	The Badlees	3:41
7.	"Easier Done Than Said"	The Badlees	4:10
8.	"Tore Down Flat in Jackson"	The Badlees, Mike Naydock	4:24
9.	"The Unfunny"	The Badlees, Naydock	3:14
10.	"Little Eddie"	Bret Alexander, Naydock	4:07
11.	"It Don't Matter Anymore to Me"	The Badlees	3:34
12.	"A Matter of Time"	The Badlees	5:30

== Personnel ==
The Badlees

- Pete Palladino – Lead vocals
- Bret Alexander – Guitar, mandolin, dulcimer, vocals
- Jeff Feltenberger – Guitar, vocals
- Paul Smith – Bass, vocals
- Ron Simasek – Drums, percussion

Additional musicians

- Daine Paul Russell - Harmonica on "She's the Woman"

Production

- Jack Pyers – Producer
- P.J. Labelle, Tony Lomma, and Frank Ripa - Executive producers
- Doug Conroy, Greg DiGesu, and Jeff Mauriello - Engineers at Waterfront Recording
- Scott Berger - Engineer at Susquehanna Sound
- Steve Forney, Allan Neve and Kevin Jackson - Engineers at Dajhelon Recording
- Donna Glass and Pete Palladino - Layout and design
- Jimmy Lee Burgess - Cover model
- Terry Selders - Personal manager
- Anthony Palladino - Business manager
- Scott Berger - Tour manager
- Parker Bandy - Live Sound
