= Laura Shay =

American singer-songwriter

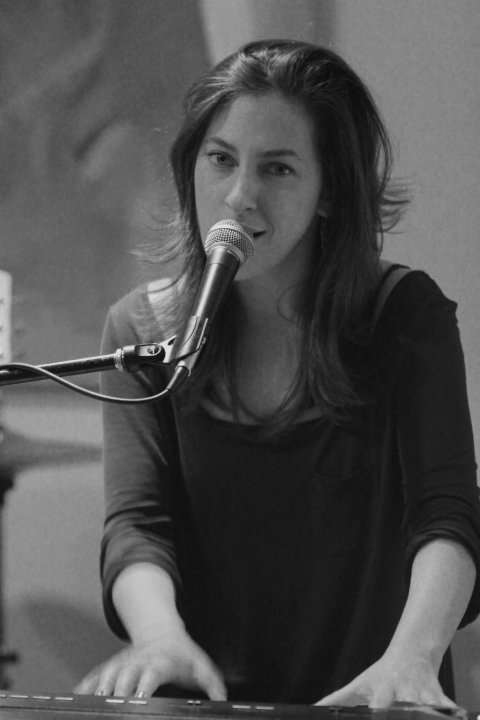
- Laura Shay in 2010

Background information
- Birth name: Laura Anne Shay
- Born: November 7, 1982 (age 42); Philadelphia, Pennsylvania, U.S.
- Genres: Pop, Easy listening
- Occupation(s): Singer, lyricist, composer
- Years active: 2005–present
- Labels: Indie
- Website: laurashay.com

Laura Shay is an independent singer-songwriter from Philadelphia. She released her first album, To a Place in 2005 and released her fourth album, Love & Other Things in November 2011.

== History ==
Laura was born on November 7, 1982, in Philadelphia, Pennsylvania. She is the youngest child of Eleanor and Gerard Shay and has three older siblings. Laura started singing in her elementary school choir when she was 8 years old and had one year of piano lessons at age 9. She began writing her own songs at the age of 13. On September 11, 1999, when she was 16, Laura performed her own music for the first time publicly at a local open mic. The coffee house that hosted the open mic offered Laura her first paying gig and she has been performing her original music locally and independently ever since. Over the past few years, her music has gained popularity through various regional and international licensing opportunities.

Laura has a master's degree in both Communication Studies and Communicative Disorders. She works part-time as an adjunct professor of Interpersonal Communication and full-time as a speech-language pathologist.

=== Discography ===
Date released (on iTunes Store)	Title	Type	Number of tracks
June 2005	To a Place	LP	12 songs
November 2008	Bittersweet	LP	14 songs
February 2010	Blue Light Sessions	EP	8 songs
November 2011	Love & Other Things	EP	9 songs

Note: In 2001, Laura recorded a collection of songs entitled Stories of My Life in a friend's home studio. It was released in limited units as a rough compilation of early demos that were written during her teenage years and is not available for purchase at this time.

=== Notable Song Placements ===
1. First to Fall from the album Bittersweet was prominently featured in the Hallmark Movie Elevator Girl, and also in a commercial that aired in the Czech Republic.
2. Toronto from To a Place has been used at the end of episodes of the Food Network’s show Chopped.
3. Anyway from To a Place was featured in the BBC's show Skins
4. Four of Laura's songs will be featured in the independent film All in Time by writer/co-director Chris Fetchko and co-director/producer Marina Donahue. Laura also worked as a principal actress in the film, playing a version of herself as a student and musician.
5. Several of Laura's songs have been featured in X-art's erotic movies.

=== Influences ===
Tori Amos, Stevie Nicks, and Joni Mitchell were her biggest influences and had a profound effect on the type of performer she is. Some of her favorite contemporary songwriters include Brandi Carlile, Kathleen Edwards, Fiona Apple, Paula Cole and Patty Griffin.

=== Featured Musicians ===
The following musicians perform regularly with Laura:

- Laura Shay – Vocals, piano, lyrics, composition
- Dominic Cole – Acoustic/ Electric guitar
- Michael Litt – Drums
- Andy McGowan – Bass
- Mike McCarthy – Flugal Horn
- Nyke van Wyk – Violin
- Karen Shay – Percussion
