= The Badlees =

American roots rock band

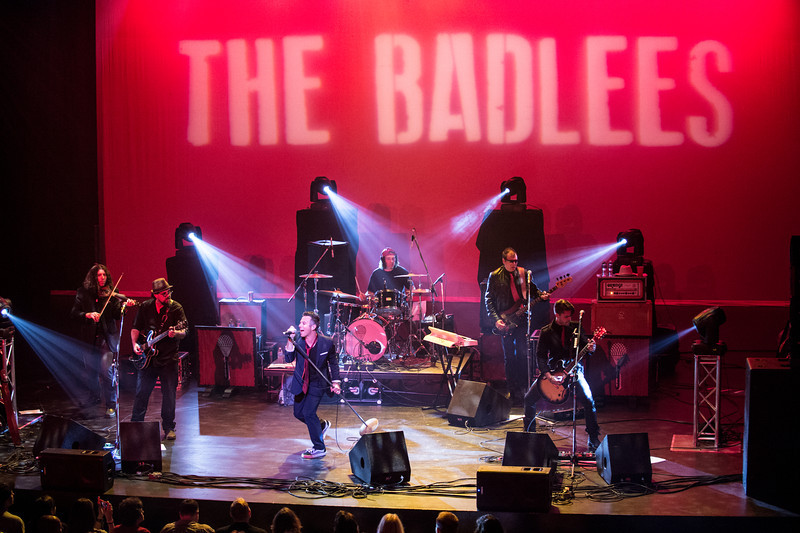
- The Badlees – 2013

Background information
- Origin: Selinsgrove, Pennsylvania, United States
- Genres: Rock and roll; roots rock
- Years active: 1990–present
- Labels: Rite-Off; Sharkstooth; Polydor/Atlas; Ark 21; Saturation Acres
- Members: Bret Alexander; Pete Palladino; Jeff Feltenberger; Nyke Van Wyk; Paul Smith; Ron Simasek
- Past members: Dustin Drevitch; Ric Stehman
- Website: www.badlees.com

The Badlees are an American roots rock band from Selinsgrove, Pennsylvania that formed in 1990. They released several independent albums and achieved national success with their 1995 album River Songs. In 1998, after recording a follow-up album, Polydor/Atlas was sold to the Seagram Corporation, which delayed the release of the album and eventually led to the Badlees being dropped from the roster.

The group has continued to perform and produce albums independently, releasing the double album Epiphones and Empty Rooms in 2013 and their self-titled 2022 album The Badlees. The Badlees and its individual members have inspired, mentored, advised, produced for, and performed with artists throughout the Pennsylvania music scene.

== History ==
=== Beginnings (1981–1989) ===
Three students from Mansfield University in north-central Pennsylvania met while attending the school's music department in the early 1980s. Singer and multi-instrumentalist Jeff Feltenberger was a vocal performance major, drummer Ron Simasek was a music education major, while saxophonist and future Badlees manager Terry Selders was a music merchandising major. While at Mansfield, the three played in various pickup bands with names such as The Leaky Sneakers and Secret Service.

After graduation, the three initially went their separate ways. Selders went to New York City where he managed a recording studio. Simasek went to Florida at first but then later joined Selders in New York where he became drummer for the band Kaos. Feltenberger entered the teaching profession and reunited with the band that he formed in high school with his brother Steve Feltenberger on bass and guitarist Clint Barrick.

In 1988, Jeff Feltenberger contacted Terry Selders about making a professional recording with his band. Selders was in the process of forming an independent record label with producer Bill Grabowski and thought Feltenberger's music would be a good fit for their first project. He convinced Simasek to join in as drummer and the new band, known as Bad Lee White went into Grabowski's studio to record the initial album for the new A Street Records. The studio was called Susquehanna Sound and was located in Northumberland, Pennsylvania. There, the band worked with the studio's chief engineer, Bret Alexander.

Alexander was a high school football standout who went on to play defensive end for three seasons at Bucknell University. A guitarist in the band Masque, back in his home town of Canton, Pennsylvania, Alexander took a credited internship at Susquehanna Sound while a student at Bucknell and eventually gained employment at the studio after graduation. While working on the Bad Lee White album, Alexander added some guitar overdubs, and the band asked him to join as a permanent member.

What Goes Around by Bad Lee White was released on A Street Records in November 1988. It contained four originals, three co-written by guitarist Jeff Feltenberger and producer Bill Grabowski, with "Boomerang" written by another A Street prospect, Charlie Crystle. However, A-Street soon ended its short run as an independent label, which kept What Goes Around from reaching a second pressing.

=== Formation and early years (1990–1993) ===
After the release of their debut album, Bad Lee White guitarist Clint Barrick left the group and was later followed by bassist Steve Feltenberger, who enlisted in the Marines. Susquehanna Sound became a hub for the remaining members as Bret Alexander continued on as chief engineer with Jeff Feltenberger and Ron Simasek frequently joining him to work on sessions or rehearse new material.

One day, a local band named Anthem from nearby Susquehanna University came in to record at the studio. The band's singer, Pete Palladino, was eventually offered the lead vocal position in Bad Lee White. Soon after, the newly revised band officially changed their name to what fans had begun commonly calling them at shows, The Badlees.

With the addition of Palladino, the band's audience began to grow, due to his stage antics and classic front-man image. This was important because the band was determined to concentrate on original material. Alexander became the group's chief songwriter, working with Mike Naydock, a disc jockey from Hazleton, PA. Their partnership began with the first Badlees EP, It Ain't For You in 1990 and continues to the present day, with Alexander writing the music and melodies and Naydock writing the lyrics.

On October 10, 1990, the Badlees released the four song EP It Ain't For You, which was Bret Alexander's debut as producer. It was released on Terry Selders' newly formed independent label, Rite-Off Records and it received positive press, such as Billboard Magazine's famed Critics' Choice award The Album Network, a weekly, well-respected music industry trade paper, invited the Badlees, as an unsigned band, to participate in their CD series called Tune Up. On the strength of the EP, the Badlees landed a gig opening for the band FireHouse, then at the peak of their brief national fame at the Metron in Harrisburg, Pennsylvania.

Terry Selders returned to central Pennsylvania to be manager of the Badlees full-time and, in 1991, Paul Smith joined as the band's permanent bass player. The Badlees set up headquarters in Selinsgrove, Pennsylvania, and began recording a full-length album.

The result was Diamonds in the Coal, released in January 1992. The album contained much décor such as philosophical quotes accompanying each song's lyrics and a cover that uses a classic photo from a local historical society. The single "Back Where We Come From (the Na Na Song)" was the first to receive prominent airplay on Pennsylvania radio stations and the closing title song, "Diamonds in the Coal" was the first example of a distinct sound that would come to define the band called "roots rock".

They were invited to perform at the SxSW Music Festival in Austin, Texas, and soon landed a corporate sponsorship with Budweiser. They produced special cassette singles with remixed versions of their songs to sell at shows, while directing audience members to a local retailer to buy the full-length album, a strategy employed by Selders to gain credibility for the Badlees among the major record chains.

By 1993, as the Badlees prepared to work on their second full-length album, they decided to take a different approach, hiring Jack Pyers, formerly of the band Dirty Looks as producer. Pyers approached the Badlees, promising a sound that more accurately reflects the energy of their live shows. The resulting effort was called The Unfortunate Result of Spare Time, recorded in the summer of 1993.

=== National success (1994–1996) ===
In 1994, Bud Light, the band's primary sponsor, offered the band the opportunity to play a series of dates in China. The Qingdao International Beer Festival, an annual event in the Chinese city of the same name, was held from August 14 through the 18th in 1994. The Badlees were the only western entertainment performing that year, playing about ten shows over the course of those five days.

Soon after the band returned home, they headed back to the studio to start on their third full-length album. The band had not been completely satisfied with The Unfortunate Result of Spare Time and planned on naming this next one simply "The Badlees" as a deliberate signal that they were returning to the "roots rock" sound. Inspired by the daily commute along the Susquehanna River to the recording studio in Harrisburg, Pennsylvania, the band decided instead to name the album River Songs.

Released independently in February 1995, River Songs was originally rejected by several major record companies, But after selling over 10,000 copies in its first few months, some of these same companies began pursuing the Badlees. One of these companies was A&M Records, who expressed interest in signing the band after a Philadelphia-based executive noticed the inordinate amount of airplay this independent band was getting on Pennsylvania radio stations. The songs primarily receiving airplay were "Angeline Is Coming Home", a song by Mike Naydock about a heroin addict returning from rehab, and Bret Alexander's "Fear of Falling", which would eventually be used by NBC during coverage of the 1996 Olympics. The Badlees were ultimately signed to the A&M subsidiary label, Polydor/Atlas. The deal was for two albums, a future album and River Songs, which was accepted by the company "as is", with no further production required for the national release. The record went on to sell 250,000 copies.

The band would spend the next year and a half constantly playing, usually as a supporting act for a national headliner. Their first really big show was opening up for Led Zeppelin's Jimmy Page & Robert Plant at the Buffalo Memorial Auditorium in Buffalo, New York, on Thursday, October 19, 1995. Later they would join tours for Bob Seger, Gregg Allman, The Gin Blossoms, and Edwin McCain, among others and perform throughout North America.

They also produced a couple of professional music videos, one for "Fear of Falling", directed by Dieter Trattmann and shot in and around Harrisburg, Pennsylvania, and one for "Angeline Is Coming Home", directed by Anthony Edwards, an actor then starring on the television drama E.R. Edward's co-star on the show, Julianna Margulies, was cast to play the "Angeline" character in the video, which was shot at Charlie Chaplin Studios in Hollywood in March 1996. The production of the "Angeline" video was covered in national publications such as People Magazine and Rolling Stone Magazine as well as the nationally syndicated television show Entertainment Tonight. It premiered on VH1's Crossroads program, but was not well received by fans, critics, nor the band itself, who came to call the video a "very expensive mistake".

=== Corporate limbo (1997–1999) ===
By the end of 1996, the band took a break from touring and hoped to turn their attention to writing and recording their next album. This second national release on Polydor was originally slated for late 1997 but, at the request of the parent label A&M, which had many of its major artists releasing albums for the Christmas season that year, the release date for the next Badlees album was moved back to February 1998. During the break from touring, some of the band members started families, and Bret Alexander set up a studio in his basement in Wapwallopen, Pennsylvania.

In Autumn of 1997 when the band entered the Bearsville Recording Studio near Woodstock, New York to record material for the album that would be titled Up There, Down Here. After working in a world class studio, Alexander and Smith, both former audio engineers, used Alexander's home studio for final overdubs and mixing of the album. However, once again, the date of release for Up There, Down Here was pushed back, this time from February to June, 1998.

Then, in May 1998, Polygram, the parent company of A&M and Polydor/Atlas, was sold to Seagram's, a Canadian beverage company, for about $10.4 billion. Seagram's, which already had a large stake in entertainment by owning MCA Records and Universal Studios, now also owned the vast array of labels that fell under the Polygram umbrella they decided to consolidate all of these vast operations into one new central entertainment company called The Universal Music Group (UMG). As a result of the restructuring, there would be yet another delay in the release of the now finished Up There, Down Here album, this time from fall 1998 to "date uncertain" and there were no marketing or tour support plans coming from Universal for the foreseeable future. But the band was still under contract and therefore restricted in the actions that they could take to further their career. The Badlees quickly produced and released an EP of “unplugged” songs called The Day's Parade in July 1998, released on Rite-Off Records.

As the corporate limbo persisted into 1999, the band became more and more convinced that they wanted out of their major label contract. They opted to make their own full-length album independently and without consent from the label. The band members realized that this action would probably mean the death of Up There, Down Here, as Universal owned the rights to that recording.

The new album, Amazing Grace, was recorded, mixed, mastered, and pressed in two months at Bret Alexander's home studio. The album features four different Badlees singing lead vocals on songs written by five different writers, including Mike Naydock. It was released on April 2, 1999, and upon its release the band was dropped by Universal. Selders persisted in finding a new label and within a month, the Badlees were signed to a new contract with a label called Ark 21, owned by Miles Copeland III, who had previously owned I.R.S. Records.

Up There, Down Here would finally be released to the public on August 24, 1999 on the Ark 21 label. The only provision of the deal was that the Badlees would have to stop actively promoting their recently released Amazing Grace album. The group planned to tour behind Up There Down Here, but by this time Ark 21 was well on its way to bankruptcy. The Badlees left Ark 21 after a very short period and returned to their status as an independent band. Selders left as manager soon after this.

=== Branching out (2000–2001) ===
Bret Alexander and Paul Smith decided to open a studio for business, choosing a private location near Danville, Pennsylvania, owned by Rusty Foulke of the band Hybrid Ice. The studio had been called Magnetic North and, starting with their first EP in 1990, the Badlees used it to make pre-production demos prior to recording their albums in a professional studio. Alexander and Smith decided to call their studio Saturation Acres. Over the course of the next decade, they would produce many Pennsylvania artists, including some that would become nationally successful, such as Breaking Benjamin and Darcie Miner. Further, The Cellarbirds, a pick-up band that includes the Badlee trio of Alexander, Smith, and drummer Ron Simasek, were available as the official "house band" to offer session performances for solo artists or those with less than a full band.

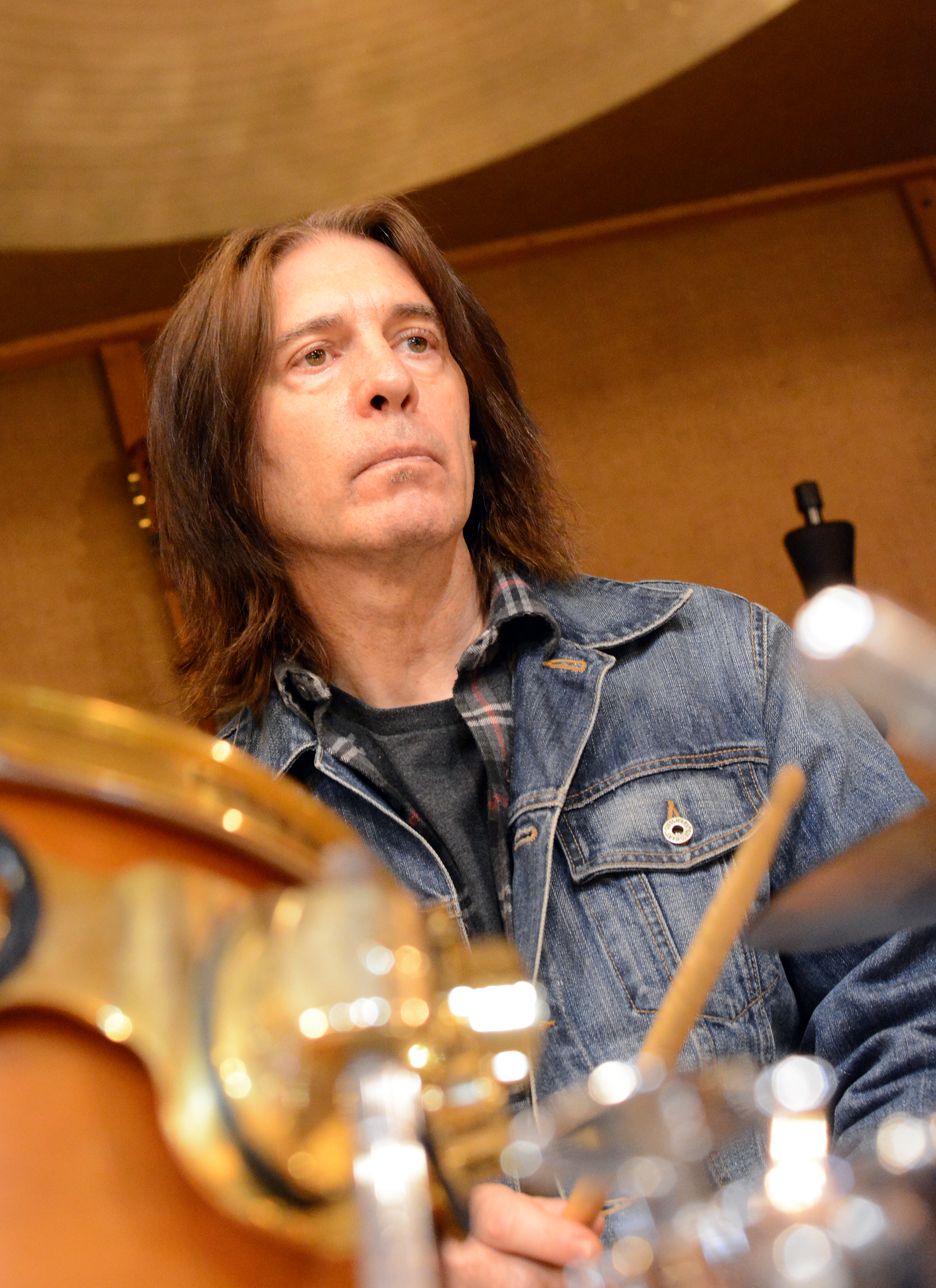
Ron Simasek - Drums

Meanwhile, Palladino and Feltenberger were also working on their own separate solo projects while continuing to perform live together as the Pete & Jeff Duo. Simasek would also join them on occasion to become Pete, Jeff, & Ron, and on one such occasion, Pete brought in some professional equipment to record a live show by the trio in Williamsport, Pennsylvania, resulting in the live album, 50:45 Live, which would ultimately be the last album released on the Rite-Off label in 2000.

As 2001 got underway, the members of the Badlees were busy working on their separate "side" albums that would end up being released within six weeks of each other in the late spring of 2001. Echotown was a self-titled album by Jeff Feltenberger's pick-up band and had a definite country-rock sound. Pete Palladino released a solo album, Sweet Siren of the Reconnected, in June 2001 that included contributions from every member of the Badlees to various degrees. The Cellarbirds also released their debut album, Perfect Smile. Despite being separate from the Badlees, these projects did include some common traits. Each was recorded at Saturation Acres, either produced or co-produced by Alexander, and Simasek played drums on each.

=== Renew and long hiatus (2002–2008) ===
The Badlees got back together and make music once again as a band for a charitable event, Concert for Karen IV, in 2002. They got together at Saturation Acres and recorded four songs for an EP to be released in conjunction with the live event and decided to continue on to make a full-length album. This decision was spearheaded by Chris Fetchko, a native of Hazleton, Pennsylvania, who at the time worked at Capitol Records and would eventually replace Terry Selders as The Badlees' new manager.

The album, Renew, was released in June, 2002 and to support it, the band filmed a special show at the Grand Ballroom of the Manhattan Center in New York City in July, 2002. The show was titled Renew and Rewind and aired on a local Pennsylvania television in late August.

Bret Alexander and Mike Naydock did many songwriting sessions in late 2002 through 2003, intending to have a new Badlees album in 2004, but this album failed to materialize due to other projects that Alexander, Fetchko, and Saturation Acres were involved in at the time. These included Lit Riffs, a soundtrack to a book of the same name by MTV, for which the Badlees recorded a cover of Rod Stewart's "Maggie May", and Gentleman East, an Americana-flavored solo album by Bret Alexander, which was originally intended to be the soundtrack for a motion picture produced by Fetchko called Everything's Jake. Also in that period, Alexander, Simasek, and Smith (as The Cellarbirds) backed singer-songwriter Johnny J. Blair on a cover of "Sunday Morning" by Velvet Underground. The track was part of a Lou Reed tribute project, After Hours, which was released to global acclaim and was eventually commended by Lou Reed himself on Reed's official website.

In March 2004, Jeff Feltenberger announced he was officially leaving the Badlees as he planned to pursue a career as a record producer/engineer as well as launch his new band Sweet Pea Felty, the first shift in personnel among the musicians since 1991.

The remaining members of the band, along with Fetchko, formed an equal partnership in the label S.A.M. Records ("Saturation Acres Music"), and began to sign other musical artists to the label, including Katsu, Joe Charles, and Jared Campbell. But over time, these Fetchko projects dried up and, within a year or so, Fetchko departed from the band as manager. Throughout the bulk of the rest of the decade, the Badlees would be on an, unplanned, extended hiatus.

Pete Palladino moved to Philadelphia where he got into the restaurant business, eventually becoming general manager of the hotel and restaurant Daddy O in Long Beach Island, New Jersey. Ron Simasek remained the primary session drummer at Saturation Acres and played drums in various settings. Alexander and Smith continued to operate Saturation Acres, recording and producing scores of musical acts and branching out into other areas such as licensing. In 2005, they recorded a cover of "Keep on the Sunny Side" with singer Kate "k8" Hearity, which was used in commercials by Days Inn nationwide. But eventually Paul Smith accepted a position as an instructor at Susquehanna University and left Saturation Acres in 2007. Soon after, Alexander moved the studio to commercial location in Dupont, Pennsylvania, sharing the building with his wife's newly opened bakery.

=== Epiphones and Empty Rooms (2009–2013) ===
In 2008, Bret Alexander formed the band Giants of Despair, which reunited him with manager Terry Selders for a short while. Later that year, Chris Gardner, the Badlees’ current manager, initiated a reunion of the band with the help of Ron Simasek. Together, they persuaded the rest of the band members, including Alexander, to reunite and work on the new album.

The album included songs that had been written as far back as 2003, two of which, "Don't Ever Let Me Down" and "Well Laid Plans" were previously released by Alexander as solo efforts in the mid-2000s. One final song, "Two States" was added late to the project as a tribute to Alexander's father, who died February 14, 2009.

Love is Rain, the Badlees' album for which Gardner acted as Executive Producer and offered financing for the album's production, was released in October 2009. It was acclaimed by several critics as "the band's finest album ever."

After its release, the Badlees played a series of live shows together for the first time in five years starting in November, 2009. These shows frequently included guest musicians like Aaron Fink, Nick Van Wyke, and Dustin Drevitch, along with the four remaining members of the band – Alexander, Palladino, Simasek, and Smith.

Between 2003 and 2010, Alexander joined Johnny J. Blair in a handful of concerts and a live radio broadcast. Returning to the studio with Blair, Alexander and Simasek backed Blair on the recording "If I Could Dress Like Clive Owen," quoting spy-movie music and The Yardbirds while tributing male fashion and British actor Clive Owen. The track was issued on Blair's 2011 album I Like the Street

The Badlees would continue to perform shows throughout Pennsylvania to accommodate the various other vocations of the band's members. Not wanting to have such a gap between albums, like between the last two, the Badlees released a "greatest hits" album in 2012 titled "See Me as a Picture; The Best So Far (1990–2012)". And in the fall of 2013, they released a 21 song album, which is a double-album titled Epiphones and Empty Rooms. The band toured with Bob Seger again, and ramped up their touring schedule.

=== Departure of Bret Alexander and Paul Smith (2014–2021) ===
On March 27, 2014, Bret Alexander announced on The Badlees official Facebook page that he was no longer a member of The Badlees. On March 28, Paul Smith also announced his departure from the band. While declining to air private disagreements or grievances in a public forum, Alexander indicated that his desire is to be a full-time vocational musician—a goal no longer shared by all members of the band. Pete Palladino and Ron Simasek confirmed the departure of Alexander and Smith and announced that upcoming shows that were already booked will feature special guests along with the remaining members of The Badlees. Beyond that, no recording or performing as The Badlees is planned for "the foreseeable future." All members indicated plans to continue making and performing music.

The current band is featured in the 2015 film All in Time, which was released in October 2016. The band contributed 10 songs to the film and is featured in the soundtrack. Two of the Badlees play roles in the film.

On December 18, 2020, it was announced that the Badlees were part of the 2021 Central PA Music Hall of Fame along with Jimmy Dorsey, Tommy Dorsey, Jeffrey Gaines, Halestorm, and Pentagon. They reunited to perform one set and accept this award on Thursday, July 1, 2021, at the 2nd Annual CPMHOF Awards Ceremony which was completely sold out.

=== Return of Bret Alexander and Paul Smith (2021-present) ===
After performing together at the Central Pennsylvania Music Hall of Fame concert on July 1, 2021, the original five members of The Badlees have played a few shows together and seem to be back to the old days of original rock from Central PA. They announced a show at the Englewood in Hummelstown on March 5, 2022, which sold out in less than 24 hours. A second show was added on March 4, 2022, which sold out within 30 minutes of being added. It appears as if things are pointing to a long-term playing commitment from all five original members of the Badlees - which is great for them, but better for Central PA Rock Music fans! In December, 2022, the Badlees released their 9th, full-length self-titled eponymous record, The Badlees.

In 2023, the Badlees were inducted into the Luzerne County Arts & Entertainment Hall of Fame. They were among the inaugural class of inductees.

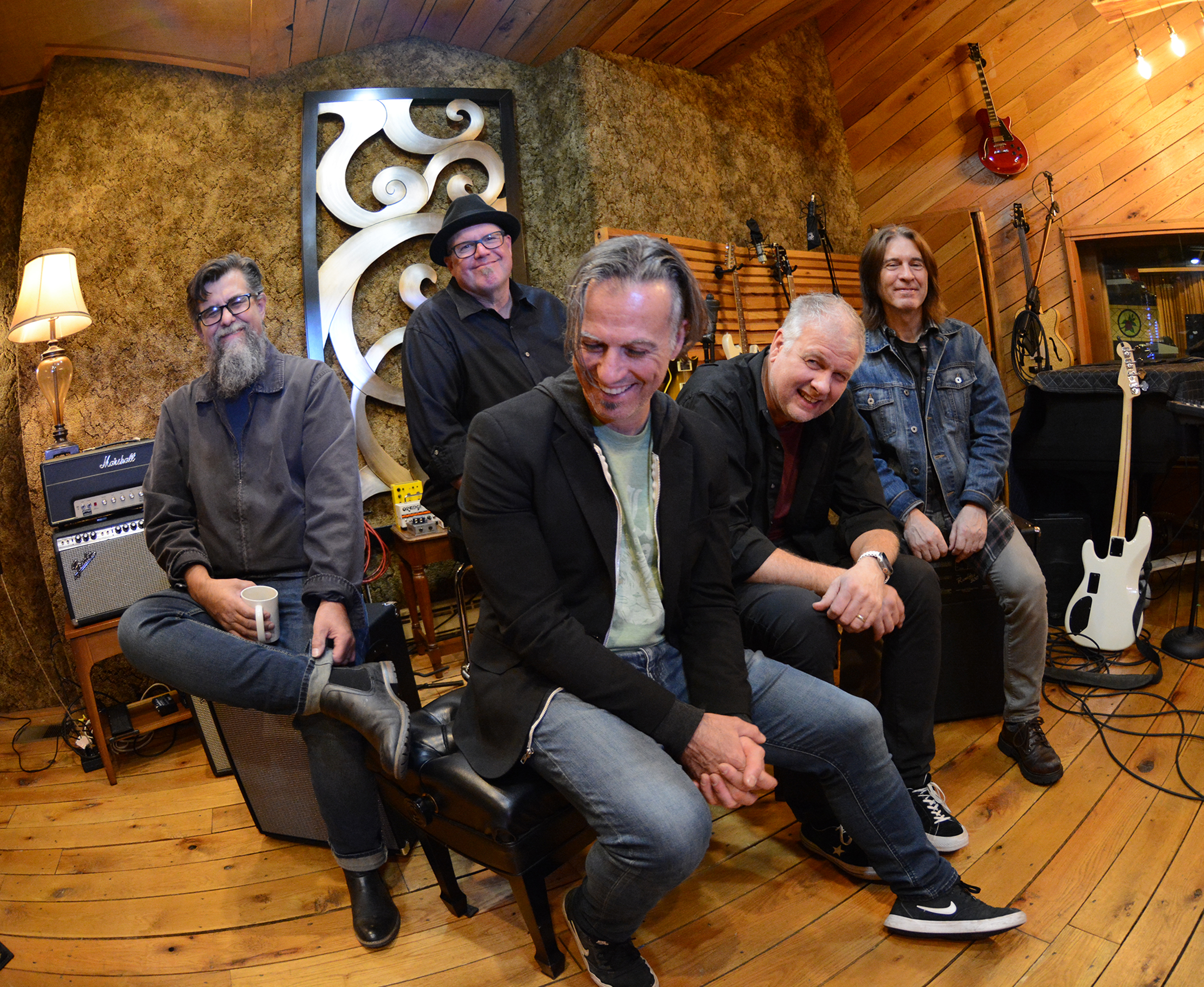
The Badlees 2022

== Musical style and influences ==
The Badlees forged a distinctive sound through their formative years that fused rock and pop elements with a distinct Pennsylvania style they called "roots rock". This sound was best presented on their breakthrough album River Songs, released in 1995. Some of the band's later efforts, especially Amazing Grace and Love Is Rain, branched out into several different subgenres, such as new wave, blues, folk, country, and Americana.

The band members themselves drew their influences from diverse sources. Founding member Jeff Feltenberger was formally trained as a vocalist and multi-instrumentalist, with a tendency towards folk, country, and bluegrass. Guitarist and chief songwriter Bret Alexander cites various influences ranging from John Lennon and the Beatles to Johnny Cash, Bob Dylan, Tom Petty, and Steve Earle. Drummer Ron Simasek is a huge fan of Frank Zappa and, along with bassist Paul Smith, the Canadian power trio Rush. Singer Pete Palladino drew his influences from a spectrum of rock and pop artists including contemporaries Counting Crows and Edwin McCain.

== Band members ==
=== Current band members ===
- Pete Palladino – vocals, harmonica
- Ron Simasek – drums and percussion
- Jeff Feltenberger - guitars, vocals
- Paul Smith - bass guitar, vocals
- Bret Alexander - guitars, mandolin, zither, dulcimer, vocals

=== Former band members ===
- Jeff Feltenberger – guitars and multiple string instruments, vocals (Bad Lee White & Badlees, 1988–2004)
- Ric Stehman – bass guitar (Badlees, 1990–1991)
- Steve Feltenberger – bass, vocals (Bad Lee White, 1988–1990)
- Clint Barrick – guitars, vocals (Bad Lee White, 1988–1989)

== Discography ==
=== Studio albums ===
- Diamonds in the Coal (Rite-Off, January 1992)
- The Unfortunate Result of Spare Time (Sharkstooth, August 1993)
- River Songs (Rite-Off, February 1995 & Polydor/Atlas, October 1995)
- Amazing Grace (Rite-Off, April 1999)
- Up There, Down Here (Ark 21, August 1999)
- Renew (S.A.M., June 2002)
- Love is Rain (S.A.M., October 2009)
- Epiphones and Empty Rooms (S.A.M., October 2013)
- The Badlees (S.A.M., December 2022)

=== Extended plays ===
- It Ain't For You EP (Rite-Off, October 1990)
- The Day's Parade EP (Rite-Off, July 1998)

=== Live albums ===
- If Memories Had Equity (Live) (S.A.M., January 2002)

=== Compilations ===
- See Me As a Picture, The Best of 1990–2012 (S.A.M., April 2012)

=== Charting singles ===
Year	Title	Chart positions				Album
Year	Title	US Mainstream Rock	US Adult Top 40	US Top 40 Mainstream	Billboard Hot 100	Album
1995	"Fear of Falling"	31	-	-	-	River Songs
1996	"Angeline Is Coming Home"	20	28	27	67	River Songs

=== Albums by Badlees members ===
- What Goes Around by Bad Lee White (A Street Records, November 1988)
- 50:45 Live by Pete, Jeff, & Ron (Rite-Off, September 2000)
- Echotown by Echotown (Midwest Artists, May 2001)
- Perfect Smile by The Cellarbirds (S.A.M., May 2001)
- Sweet Siren of the Reconnected by Pete Palladino (P&P Records, June 2001)
- Gentleman East by Bret Alexander (S.A.M., May 2004)

=== Other projects involving Badlee members ===
Year	Project	Type	Badlee member / contribution
2003	Sunday Morning	Opening song Lou Reed tribute album with Johnny J. Blair	Bret Alexander, Guitars; Paul Smith, Bass; Ron Simasek, Drums
2004	The Road Goes Other Places	Album by Jay Young	Bret Alexander, Guitars; Paul Smith, Bass; Ron Simasek, Drums
2004	Rest Out	Album by Jared Campbell	Bret Alexander, Guitars; Paul Smith, Bass; Ron Simasek, Drums
2004	Carson's Window	Album by Carson's Window	Bret Alexander, Guitars, Mandolin, Banjo; Paul Smith, Organ
2005	Wishful Drinkin	Album by Shawn Z.	Bret Alexander, Guitars; Paul Smith, Bass; Ron Simasek, Drums
2005	Keep on the Sunny Side	Song by K8	Bret Alexander, Guitars; Paul Smith, Bass; Ron Simasek, Drums
2005	Imaginary Lines I	Album by Imaginary Lines	Bret Alexander, Guitars; Ron Simasek, Drums
2007	Imaginary Lines II	Album by Imaginary Lines	Ron Simasek, Drums
2008	St. Jude Avenue	Album by Shawn Z	Bret Alexander, Guitars; Paul Smith, Bass; Ron Simasek, Drums
2009	Love	EP by Mycenea Worley	Bret Alexander, Multi Instruments; Ron Simasek, Drums
2009	Imaginary Lines 33	Album by Imaginary Lines	Bret Alexander, Guitars; Ron Simasek, Drums
2010	Song for Diane	Song by Ric Albano	Bret Alexander, Multi Instruments; Ron Simasek, Drums
2010	See That My Grave is Kept Clean	Album by Ed Randazzo	Bret Alexander, Multi Instruments
2011	I Like the Street	Album by Johnny J. Blair	Bret Alexander, Guitars; Ron Simasek, Drums

== Other sources ==
- "The Unfortunate Result of Spare Time" by Dave Donati, Pennsylvania Musician Vol.XII No. 142 (p. 11), August 1993
- The Unfortunate Result of Spare Time by The Badlees (Album Liner Notes), Rite-Off Records, August 24, 1993
- "Big And Badlee" by Alan K. Stout, Wilkes-Barre Times Leader, September 24, 1993
- "Badlees Off to Perform in China" by Alan K. Stout, Wilkes-Barre Times Leader, August 11, 1994
- "Bud Light Sends the Badlees to China" by John Birmingham, Pennsylvania Musician Vol.XIV No. 154 (p. 14), September 1994
- "Badlees Recall Trip to China" by Alan K. Stout, Wilkes-Barre Times Leader, September 23, 1994
- "Badlees Back from Abroad in Studio" by Dave Donati, Sound Check, Issue 3 Vol.2, October 1994
- "Small Town Band Headed to Big Time" by Jennifer Huff, Panorama Magazine, Vol.14 No. 10 (p. 51), October 1994
- River Songs by The Badlees (Album Liner Notes), Rite-Off Records, February 28, 1995
- "Take a cruise on Badlees' New 'River' " by Alan K. Stout, Wilkes-Barre Times Leader, February 28, 1995
- "On the Road with a Band That's on a Roll" by Alan K. Stout, Wilkes-Barre Times Leader, March 26, 1995
- "Badlees Land Major Label Contract" by Deborah Courville Mass Appeal Vol.4 No.1 (p. 4), September 1995
- "It's a Big Gig for Badlees in Buffalo" by Alan K. Stout, Wilkes-Barre Times Leader, October 18, 1995
- "Badlees Right at Home Among Rock Legends" by Alan K. Stout, Wilkes-Barre Times Leader, October 20, 1995
- "Badlees Bring Power Pop from Central PA" by Fred Beckley, Philadelphia Inquirer (p. 15), December 1, 1995
- "Badlees Destined for Musical Mainstream" by Kevin T Kelley, Selinsgrove Times Tribune (p.A1), December 6, 1995
- "Red Carpet Rolled Out for Big Time Rock Band" by Ruth G Igoe, Pottsville Republican (p. 1), September 20, 1996
- "Badlees Tracking Ahead in Studio" by Alan K. Stout, Wilkes-Barre Times Leader, October 1, 1997
- "Northeast PA" by Lorie Mrowzowski, Pennsylvania Musician Vol.XV No. 151 (p. 28), May 1998
- The Day's Parade by The Badlees (Album Liner Notes), Rite Off Records, July 1998
- "Parade Keeps the Badlees Moving" by Alan K. Stout, Wilkes-Barre Times Leader, July 17, 1998
- Amazing Grace by The Badlees (Album Liner Notes), Rite Off Records, April 1999
- "Amazing Spirit" by Alan K. Stout, Wilkes-Barre Times Leader, April 2, 1999
- "Seagram's Merger Delayed Release of Badlees CD" by Alan K. Stout, Wilkes-Barre Times Leader, April 2, 1999
- Up There, Down Here by The Badlees (Album Liner Notes), Ark 21, August 1999
- 50:45 Live by Pete Palladino, Jeff Feltenberger, & Ron Simasek (Album Liner Notes), Rite Off Records, September 2000
- Perfect Smile by The Cellarbirds (Album Liner Notes), S.A.M Records, May 2001
- "Cellarbirds Take Off on New CD" by Alan K. Stout, Wilkes-Barre Times Leader – Fiesta Guide (p. 11), May 11, 2001
- "3 of 5 Badlees Record CD as Part of Second Band" by Jim Dino, Hazleton Standard Speaker (p.E1), May 20, 2001
- "Going to the Birds" by Carlie Nicastro, Electric City (p. 26), May 31, 2001
- "Echotown a Winner with Debut Album" by L.A. Tarone, Hazleton Standard Speaker (p.E5), May 27, 2001
- Sweet Siren of the Reconnected by Pete Palladino (Album Liner Notes), P&P Records, June 2001
- "3 Badlees Alternate as Cellarbirds Act" by Stephen J. Pytak, Pottsville Republican (p. 19), June 8, 2001
- "Taking His Art to a More Personal Level" by Alan K. Stout, Wilkes-Barre Times Leader, June 29, 2001
- "One Man's Opinion the Best of Last Year" by L.A. Tarone, Hazleton Standard Speaker (p.E5), December 30, 2001
- Renew by The Badlees (Album Liner Notes), S.A.M Records, June 2002
- "Badlees NYC Concert Comes Home" by Alan K. Stout, Wilkes-Barre Times Leader, August 15, 2002
- Gentleman East by Bret Alexander (Album Liner Notes), S.A.M Records, May 4, 2004
- "The 'Gentleman' Goes Solo" by Alan K. Stout, Wilkes-Barre Times Leader, May 7, 2004
- Live Nation Press Release, June 5, 2006
- "Susquehanna Entertainment on the Rise" by Gina Tutko-Usalis, PAMusicScene.com, May 2009
- "Saturation Acres Turns 10" by Alan K. Stout, Wilkes-Barre Times Leader, September 9, 2009
- Love Is Rain by The Badlees (Album Liner Notes), S.A.M Records, October 6, 2010
- S.A.M. Site – Main Page, SaturationAcresMusic.com, Accessed July 10, 2010
