= Diamonds in the Coal =

Studio album by The Badlees
- Released: January 14, 1992
- Recorded: Waterfront Recording; Hoboken, NJ; Susquehanna Sound; Northumberland, PA
- Length: 47:20
- Label: Rite-Off Records
- Producer: Bret Alexander and The Badlees

The Badlees chronology
It Ain't for You (1990)	Diamonds in the Coal (1992)	The Unfortunate Result of Spare Time (1993)

Diamonds in the Coal is The Badlees first full-length album, recorded in late 1991 and released in January 1992. It is the first to feature Paul Smith on bass. The album is noted to have split the difference between accessible pop songs and deeper message-oriented folk and roots rock.

== Background ==
With the addition of Smith on bass, the Badlees quintet that would drive through their most productive years was now intact. The Badlees were now ready to start work on their first full-length album. Dedicated to performing original music, it was now time to expand their library and this would be accomplished in 1991 through the prolific songwriting of Bret Alexander, Mike Naydock, and to a smaller extent, Jeff Feltenberger.

The result is Diamonds in the Coal which, thematically, is nearly sliced in half by the light intermission of "Badlee Rap", performed by rapper Loose Bruce, while doing a session at Waterfront Studios in Hoboken, New Jersey. Songs previous to this on the album are mainly pop-oriented with strong hooks such as on the opener "Like a Rembrandt", which The Album Network picked up for its latest compilation. There’s also the crisp rocker "Just One Moment" and the mellow ballad "The Real Thing". This latter song was the band's first single from the album and was added to the regular rotation of several Pennsylvania rock-formatted radio stations. It features a comical monologue in the bridge section by Mike Naydock, his only appearance on a Badlees record as a performer; the monologue is actually a quote from the Minutemen song "#1 Hit Song" from Double Nickels on the Dime.

The second half of the album contains songs that, while still very pop-sensible and accessible, explored deeper subject matter and richer musical structure. The upbeat "Dirty Neon Times" includes vocal harmonies by Jeff Feltenberger, while "Spending My Inheritance" includes harmonica by Bret Alexander and fiddle-playing by guest performer David Rose. Perhaps the most unusual song on the album is the smooth, atmospheric "Sister Shirley", which includes a picturesque lyrical narrative by Naydock and a jazzy lead guitar by Alexander. "Diamonds in the Coal" is the closing song, which brings the listener into the dark, forgotten patch towns of Pennsylvania's Anthracite Region. The music sets the scene with a methodic, marching rhythm by Ron Simasek on the bottom end and authentic, ethnic instrumentation up above.

"There are few things easier than to live badly and die well"

This quote by Oscar Wilde was placed inner sleeve of Diamonds in the Coal, obviously because of the play on the band's name, but this was not the only quote on the album. Each song on the lyrics page contained its own special quote from philosophers and artists ranging from Aristotle to Andy Warhol. These extra features show the attention to detail the Badlees put into the creation of their first album. Simasek also located the pictures that were used for the cover and within the packaging, authentic early 20th century miner photos, from the Tamaqua (PA) Historical Society. These images would also be used in band promotions around the time of the album's release in January 1992.

== Track listing ==
No.	Title	Music	Length
1.	"Like a Rembrandt"	Bret Alexander, Mike Naydock	3:35
2.	"Back Where We Came From"	Alexander	3:26
3.	"Just One Moment"	Alexander	3:41
4.	"The Real Thing"	Alexander, Naydock	3:57
5.	"Heaven On Earth"	Alexander, Jeff Feltenberger	3:32
6.	"Interlude / Badlee Rap"	Loose Bruce, The Badlees	1:21
7.	"The Next Big Thing"	Alexander, Naydock	3:42
8.	"Dirty Neon Times"	Alexander, Naydock	3:49
9.	"Spending My Inheritance"	Alexander	4:37
10.	"Sister Shirley"	Alexander, Naydock	3:45
11.	"Mystery Girl"	Alexander, Naydock	3:31
12.	"Road to Paradise"	Feltenberger	3:42
13.	"Diamonds in the Coal"	Alexander	4:42

== Personnel ==
The Badlees

- Pete Palladino – Lead vocals
- Bret Alexander – Electric guitar, harmonica, mandolin, vocals
- Jeff Feltenberger – Acoustic guitar, vocals
- Paul Smith – Bass, keyboards, vocals
- Ron Simasek – Drums, percussion

Additional musicians

- Doug Kennedy - Guitar solo on "The Next Big Thing"
- David Rose - Violin on "Spending My Inheritance" and "Diamonds in the Coal"
- Loose Bruce - Vocals on "Badlee Rap"
- Mike Naydock - Monolog on "Back Where We Come From"

Production

- Bret Alexander – Producer, engineer
- Anthony & JoAnn Palladino - Executive producer
- Doug Conroy, Greg DiGesu, and Jeff Mauriello - Engineers at Waterfront Recording
- Paul Smith & Scott Berger - Engineers at Susquehanna Sound
- Donna Glass - Layout and design
- Terry Selders - Management
- Mark Mattocks, Al Skiles, and J.D. Dumas - Live Sound
