= Hybrid Ice =

American rock band

- Also known as: Part Two, Brigg
- Origin: Danville, Pennsylvania, U.S.
- Genres: Rock; progressive rock; AOR
- Years active: 1969–1998; 2002–present
- Labels: Escape Records, Pilot, A Street
- Members: Galen Foulke; Chris Alburger; Rick Klinger; Bob Richardson; Jason Shaffer
- Past members: Jeff Willoughby; Keith Hutcheson; David Lee Kennedy; Kevin Collins; Bernie Garzio; John Hartman; Kit Kelley; Webb Kline; Tom Harvey; Scott Adams; Woody Wolfe; Rick Shaffer

Hybrid Ice is a rock band from Danville, Pennsylvania, most notable for its song "Magdelene" released on the album Hybrid Ice in 1982, which became a regional radio hit at the time. "Magdelene" was later covered by Boston on their 1994 album Walk On. In 1984, with two sold out shows, Hybrid Ice was the first rock band ever to play at the Bloomsburg Fair.

== Live performances ==
Hybrid Ice has toured with many notable musical acts, such as Foreigner, Kansas, Joan Jett, Bad Company, The Beach Boys, Steppenwolf, The Edgar Winter Group, Ted Nugent, and Lita Ford, as well as several others. More recently they have played with Jimi Jamison of Survivor, John Cafferty of the Beaver Brown Band, Derek St. Holmes of the Ted Nugent band, and Kevin Chalfant of the Journey Experience. Hybrid Ice also played the "Legends of Rock" Cruise for 2015 through 2017.

== Personnel ==
=== Current ===
- Galen "Rusty" Foulke - lead vocals, guitar, keyboards
- Chris Alburger – lead vocals, guitar, keyboards
- Rick Klinger – drums, vocals
- Bob Richardson – keyboards, vocals, bass, drums
- Jason Shaffer – bass.

=== Former ===
- Jeff Willoughby – bass
- Keith Hutcheson – lead vocals
- David Lee Kennedy – lead vocals, bass
- Kevin Collins – lead vocals
- Bernie Garzio – bass, lead vocals
- John Hartman (deceased) – lead vocals, keyboards, guitar
- Kit Kelley – keyboards
- Webb Kline – guitar
- Tom Harvey (deceased) – guitar, vocals
- Scott Adams – lead vocals
- Woody Wolfe – guitar
- Rick Shaffer (deceased) – guitar, vocals.

== Discography ==
- Brigg (1973) (As "Brigg", contains three tracks by Hybrid Ice)
- Hybrid Ice (1982)
- No Rules (1988)
- Mind's Eye (2009).
