= Freedom isn't free =

American idiom

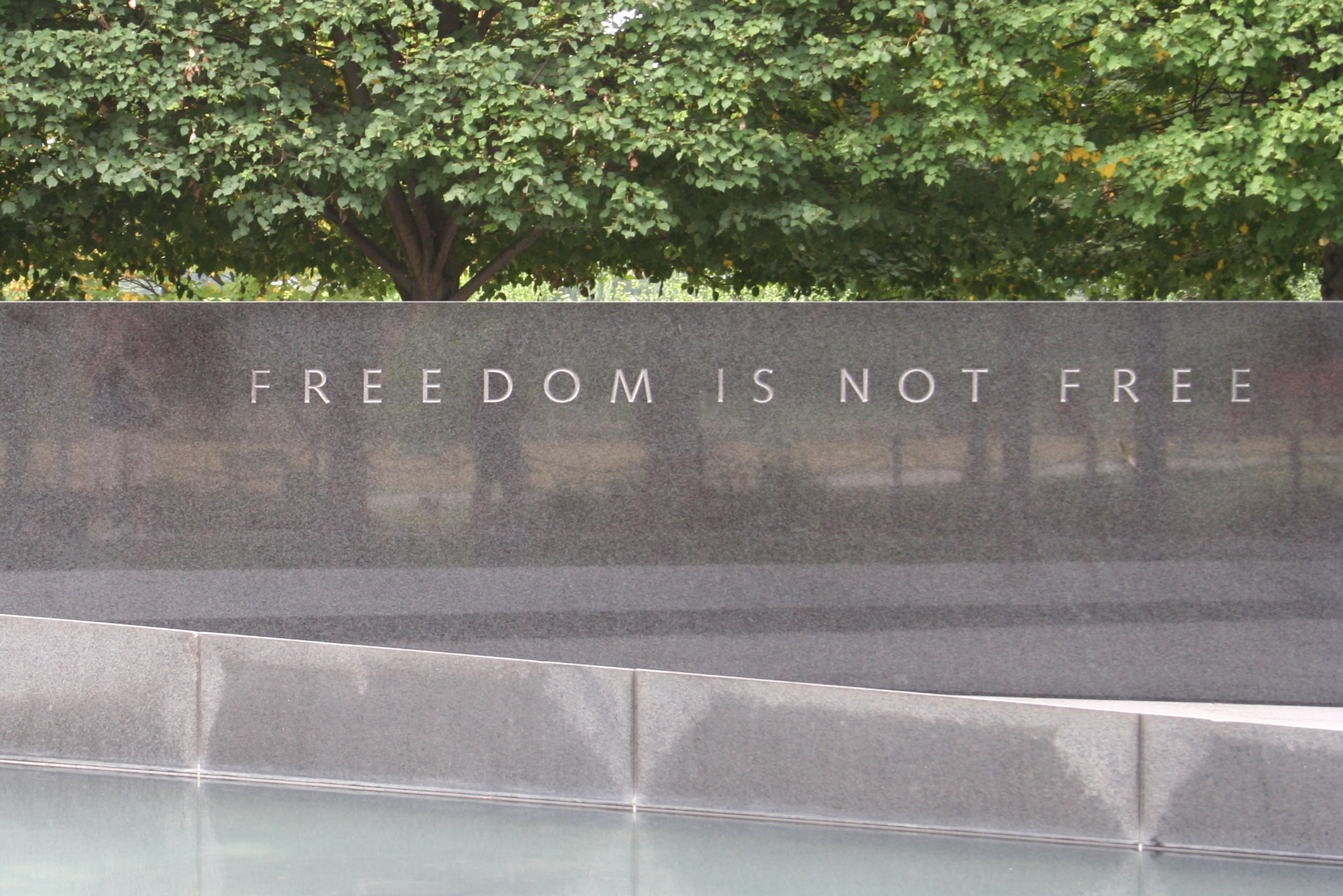
- "Freedom Is Not Free" engraved on the Washington, D.C. Korean War Veterans Memorial
- Coined by: Colonel Walter Hitchcock
- Meaning: Freedom is only possible by defense

"Freedom isn't free", "freedom is not free", "freedom's not free", or "freedom ain't free" is an American idiom, originally accredited to Colonel Walter Hitchcock. The expression is used to describe sacrifice during times of crisis, being used widely in the United States to express gratitude to the military for defending freedom. It may be used as a rhetorical device.

The phrase is more generally used to describe how Americans responded to the 9/11 attacks, "...the aftermath of the attacks, our city, our nation and people across the world came together..." It has been used by both American conservatives and liberals alike to describe the tragedy and the sacrifices of both the American people and its military after the 9/11 terrorist attacks. Serving as the ideal that sacrifice was necessary to battle terrorism, legislation was passed such as the Patriot Act which gave the American government considerable reach into surveillance of lives of common citizens. The act is now a controversial topic as some claim it is necessary to combat ongoing terrorism and others see it as a needless expansion of the federal government.

== History ==
The idiom expresses gratitude to the military, implicitly stating that the freedoms enjoyed by many citizens in many democracies are possible only through the risks taken and sacrifices made by those in the military, drafted or not. The saying is often used to convey respect specifically to those who are considered to have given their lives in defense of freedom. It is accredited to Col. Walter Hitchcock of the New Mexico Military Institute in Roswell, New Mexico.

The phrase can be found in an early recording for Liberal Party of Australia, by a fictional character, John Henry Austral. The series was a part of 200 episodes described as: "part serial, part satire [and] part soapbox." The original topic of the episode was focused on worker's rights and not the military.

"Freedom Is Not Free" is engraved into one wall at the Korean War Veterans Memorial, Washington, D.C. There is a reflective pool in front of the memorial.

== Popular culture ==
"Freedom Isn't Free" is the name of a song by Trey Parker in the 2004 film Team America: World Police and is also the name of a song recorded by Up with People.

== See also ==
- Aftermath of the September 11 attacks
