= It Ain't for You =

EP by The Badlees
- Released: October 10, 1990
- Studio: Waterfront Recording; Hoboken, NJ; The Production Block; Harrisburg, PA
- Length: 15:13
- Label: Rite-Off Records
- Producer: Bret Alexander and The Badlees

The Badlees chronology
It Ain't for You (1990)	Diamonds in the Coal (1992)

It Ain't for You, The Badlees debut EP, was recorded in Harrisburg, Pennsylvania, and Hoboken, New Jersey, and mixed by Bret Alexander back at Susquehanna Sound in Northumberland, Pennsylvania. It was Alexander's debut as a producer and it featured four, well-crafted, catchy, and energetic songs, each of which could stand alone well as a bar room anthem.

== Background ==
The Badlees derived from the band Bad Lee White, which put out the album What Goes Around in 1988. Soon after there were several shifts within the band, including the addition of Pete Palladino as lead vocalist, with the former lead vocalist, Jeff Feltenberger stepping back to provide harmonies and rhythm guitar.

On October 10, 1990, the band released the EP, which carried the deceptive title of It Ain’t for You. Put in context, the title was actually derived from the more meaningful elder-to-younger monologue of the opening song of the same name; "…It’s too late for me, but it ain’t for you".

The title song starts with a driving acoustic riff by Jeff Feltenberger and gradually builds with Alexander's layered guitars and the precision rhythm of drummer Ron Simasek and interim bass player Ric Stehman, filling in for Steve Feltenberger, who was now in the Marines. The first song also contains an excellent coda crescendo with vocal interplay between lead-singer Palladino and Feltenberger's background high harmonies. Another entertaining song is the closing number, a country-rock-ish, she-done-me-wrong song entitled "The Best Damn Things In Live Are Free". "Last Great Act of Defiance", co-written by Alexander and Mike Naydock, is perhaps the album's best song. It has an eighties-era Springsteen quality about it with a strong, storytelling lyric and precise, rockin' guitar riffs.

Terry Selders, at the time working at Bassment Records in New York City, acted as the de facto manager of the band from afar and put out It Ain't For You on his newly formed independent label, Rite-Off Records. The cover of the album, taken by Ron Simasek, was a shot of an abandoned lot across the street from Terry's apartment building on Christopher Columbus Drive in Jersey City, New Jersey.

== Track listing ==
No.	Title	Music	Length
1.	"It Ain't For You"	Bret Alexander	3:58
2.	"Mama They Must Be Crazy"	Alexander, Mike Naydock	3:17
3.	"Last Great Act of Defiance"	Alexander, Naydock	3:39
4.	"The Best Damn Things In Life Are Free"	Alexander	4:19

== Personnel ==
Musicians

- Pete Palladino – Lead vocals
- Bret Alexander – Guitars, keys
- Jeff Feltenberger – Guitars, vocals
- Ric Stehman – Bass
- Ron Simasek – Drums, percussion

Production

- Bret Alexander – Producer, engineer
- Terry Selders - Executive producer
- Greg Frey - Engineer at Waterfront Recording
- Gary Greyhosky - Engineer at The Production Block
- Ron Simasek - Cover photo
- Ken Madsen - Group photo
