= River Songs =

Studio album by The Badlees
- Released: February 28, 1995 (Rite-Off), October 1995 (Polydor/Atlas)
- Recorded: The Green Room; Harrisburg, Pennsylvania
- Length: 48:32
- Label: Rite-Off Records
- Producer: The Badlees

The Badlees chronology
The Unfortunate Result of Spare Time (1993)	River Songs (1995)	The Day's Parade (1998)

River Songs is the third full length studio album by American band The Badlees. It was released on their independent label, Rite-Off Records, in February 1995 and sold over 10,000 units before being picked up by the national label Polydor/Atlas after the band signed with that label later in 1995. The album was re-released nationally with no further production enhancement in October 1995 and went on to spawn three national hits – "Fear of Falling", "Angeline Is Coming Home", and "Gwendolyn".

== Track listing ==
Note – the order listed below is from the original Rite-Off Records release of February, 1995.

No.	Title	Music	Length
1.	"Grill the Sucker"	The Badlees	1:13
2.	"Angeline Is Coming Home"	Mike Naydock, The Badlees	4:09
3.	"Fear of Falling"	Bret Alexander, The Badlees	4:50
4.	"Angels of Mercy"	Alexander, The Badlees	4:11
5.	"Queen of Perfection"	Alexander, The Badlees	3:03
6.	"Bendin' the Rules"	Alexander, Naydock, Paul Smith, The Badlees	6:10
7.	"Gwendolyn"	Alexander, The Badlees	4:21
8.	"Ore Hill"	Jeff Feltenberger, The Badlees	4:24
9.	"Nothing Much of Anything"	Naydock, The Badlees	3:36
10.	"Song For a River"	Alexander, Naydock, The Badlees	8:17
11.	"I Liked You Better When You Hated Yourself"	Alexander, Welsh, The Badlees	2:47

== Personnel ==
- Pete Palladino – Vocals, Harmonica, Kazoo
- Bret Alexander – Guitar, Mandolin, Dobro, Dulcimer, Harmonica, Jaw Harp, Vocals
- Jeff Feltenberger – Acoustic Guitar, Vocals
- Paul Smith – Bass, Keyboards, Vocals
- Ron Simasek – Drums, Percussion, Stumpf Fiddle

Additional musicians

- Robert Scott Richardson – Hammond B-3 Organ

Production

- Gary Greyhosky, Bret Alexander, Paul Smith, Jeff Feltenberger – Engineers at The Green Room
- Joe Alexander & Brad Catlett – Engineers at Kajem Studios
- Scott Hull – Engineer at Masterdisk
- Janice Radocha – Photos
- Donna Glass and Pete Palladino – Layout and design
- Terry Selders – Personal manager
- Scott Berger – Road manager
- Keith Barshinger – Live sound engineer
- Mike Naydock – Songwriting collaborator
