= 'Bout Changes 'n' Things =

Studio album by Eric Andersen
- Released: 1966
- Recorded: 1965
- Genre: Folk
- Length: 47:25
- Label: Vanguard
- Producer: Patrick Sky

Eric Andersen chronology
Today Is the Highway (1965)	'Bout Changes 'n' Things (1966)	'Bout Changes 'n' Things Take 2 (1967)

Professional ratings
Review scores
Source	Rating
AllMusic	4/5 stars
The Rolling Stone Record Guide	3/5 stars

'Bout Changes 'n' Things is an album by the American folk singer Eric Andersen, released in 1966.

== Track listing ==
All songs by Eric Andersen unless otherwise noted.

1. "Violets of Dawn" – 3:50
2. "The Girl I Love" – 3:00
3. "That's All Right Mama" (Arthur Crudup) – 2:28
4. "Thirsty Boots" – 5:55
5. "The Hustler" – 4:02
6. "Cross Your Mind" – 4:57
7. "I Shall Go Unbounded" – 6:14
8. "Champion at Keeping Them Rolling" (Ewan MacColl, Traditional) – 2:43
9. "Hey Babe, Have You Been Cheatin'" – 3:08
10. "Blind Fiddler" – 5:12
11. "Close the Door Lightly When You Go" – 3:30
12. "My Land Is a Good Land" – 2:58

== Personnel ==
Musicians

- Eric Andersen – lead vocals, guitar, harmonica, liner notes
- Harvey Brooks – electric bass on "That's Alright Mama" and "The Hustler"
- Debbie Green – second guitar on "Violets of Dawn" and "Close the Door Lightly When You Go"

Technical

- Patrick Sky – producer
- Jules Halfant – design
- Joel Brodsky – photography
- Kieron Tyler – liner notes
