= 'Bout Changes 'n' Things Take 2 =

Studio album by Eric Andersen
- Released: 1967
- Genre: Folk
- Label: Vanguard

Eric Andersen chronology
'Bout Changes 'n' Things (1966)	'Bout Changes 'n' Things Take 2 (1967)	More Hits From Tin Can Alley (1968)

Professional ratings
Review scores
Source	Rating
Allmusic	3/5 stars

'Bout Changes 'n' Things Take 2 is a 1967 album by Eric Andersen and was released on the Vanguard Records label. It is nearly the same album as his previous release, with changes in the song sequencing and the addition of additional instruments.

== Track listing ==
All songs by Eric Andersen unless otherwise noted.

1. "Close the Door Lightly" – 3:49
2. "That's All Right Mama" (Arthur Crudup) – 2:56
3. "Blind Fiddler" – 4:49
4. "The Hustler" – 4:51
5. "Thirsty Boots" – 5:14
6. "My Land is a Good Land" – 3:00
7. "Hey Babe, Have You Been Cheatin'" – 3:36
8. "Cross Your Mind" – 5:17
9. "Champion at Keeping Them Rolling" (Ewan MacColl) – 4:30
10. "I Shall Go Unbounded" – 4:28
11. "Violets of Dawn" – 4:12
12. "The Girl I Love" – 3:36

== Personnel ==
=== Musicians ===
- Eric Andersen – lead vocals, guitar, harmonica
- Paul Harris – piano, organ
- Harvey Brooks – bass
- Herbie Lovelle – drums
- Debbie Green – second guitar on "Violets of Dawn"

=== Technical ===
- Joel Brodsky – photography
- Alice Ochs – photography
