= Today Is the Highway =

Studio album by Eric Andersen
- Released: 1965
- Genre: Folk
- Length: 43:07
- Label: Vanguard

Eric Andersen chronology
| Today Is the Highway (1965) | 'Bout Changes 'n' Things (1966) |

Professional ratings
Review scores
| Source | Rating |
|---|---|
| Allmusic | 3/5 stars |

Today Is the Highway is the debut album of folk singer Eric Andersen, released in 1965 on Vanguard Records. Andersen's first wife Deborah Green Andersen, accompanied him on second guitar for two tracks, "Today Is the Highway" and "Bumblebee".

== Track listing ==
All songs by Eric Andersen unless otherwise noted.

1. "Today Is the Highway" – 2:22
2. "Dusty Box Car Wall" – 2:22
3. "Time for My Returning" – 3:19
4. "Plains of Nebrasky-O" – 3:29
5. "Looking Glass" – 5:05
6. "Never Coming Home" – 3:09
7. "Come to My Bedside" – 3:56
8. "Baby, Please Don't Go" (Big Joe Williams) – 3:22
9. "Everything Ain't Been Said" – 4:39
10. "Bay of Mexico" – 3:09
11. "Song to J.C.B." – 4:55
12. "Bumblebee" – 3:20

== Personnel ==
=== Musicians ===
- Eric Andersen – lead vocals, guitar, harmonica
- Debbie Green – guitar, (tracks 1, 12)

=== Technical ===
- Richard Knapp – photography
- Jules Halfant – design
- Stacey Williams – liner notes
