= Solomon, ex-Lambert Stradivarius =

Stradivari violin

The Solomon, Ex-Lambert Stradivarius of 1729 is a violin fabricated by Italian luthier Antonio Stradivari of Cremona (1644–1737). The instrument derives its name from previous owners Seymour Solomon, co-founder of Vanguard Records, and British violinist, Dorothy Mary Murray Lambert.

== Provenance ==
The first recorded owner of the Solomon, Ex-Lambert Stradivarius was Berlin dealer and expert August Riechers who sold it to 'Miss Price', a student of the violin studying in Berlin at the time. From Price the violin passed to the venerable English collector Robert Bower, one of the preeminent connoisseurs of his day who owned no fewer than twenty-four Stradivari instruments. By 1922 the violin was sold through the London dealers of John and Arthur Beare to Ernest E. Winterbotham who paid GB£1,600 and presented the violin to his wife Dorothy Mary Murray Lambert.

Known as Miss Murray Lambert, she was among the few British women of the 1920s and 1930s who pursued a career as a concert violinist. A student of both Carl Flesch and Leopold Auer she was a champion of British contemporary composers and a prolific performer of the works of Sir Hamilton Harty. It is said that her performances of the Violin Sonata No.1 by Frederick Delius inspired the artist Hugh Riviere R.A. (1869–1956) to create his final full-length portrait, Delius Sonata. By the late 1930s Lambert withdrew from the concert stage to concentrate on teaching which she pursued through the 1950s.

Following Lambert's death the violin was offered at auction in 1972 as "The Property of Miss Murray Lambert", selling for GB£17,500 to Seymour Solomon.

On 23 February 2007 a demonstration performance of the Solomon, Ex-Lambert by violinist Ruth Palmer was held for the press launch for the auction by Christie's. The violin sold for US$2.728 million on 2 April 2007 to an anonymous bidder represented by violin buying agent Ric Heinl.

== See also ==
- Stradivarius
