= Danko/Fjeld/Andersen =

Studio album by Danko/Fjeld/Andersen
- Released: 3 June 1991
- Recorded: March–April 1991
- Genre: Folk-rock
- Length: 45:28
- Label: Rykodisc
- Producers: Eric Andersen, Rick Danko, Jonas Fjeld

Danko/Fjeld/Andersen chronology
Danko/Fjeld/Andersen (1991)	Ridin' on the Blinds (1994)

Professional ratings
Review scores
Source	Rating
AllMusic	4/5 stars

Danko/Fjeld/Andersen is the first of two albums featuring the multi-national folk trio of Rick Danko (Canada), Jonas Fjeld (Norway) and Eric Andersen (United States). The album melds elements of folk, rock, country and blues.

The record features remakes of songs recorded by the group members in their solo careers, such as "Blue Hotel" by Fjeld and "Blue River" by Andersen.

First released on Stageway Records in Norway on 3 June 1991, it was released in the United States on Rykodisc on 28 September 1993.

It was reissued as One More Shot in 2002 with a second disc containing a live concert by the trio recorded at Moldejazz in Norway in 1991. Danko died in 1999.

== Reception ==
The album received perfect reviews from Fredrik Wandrup in Dagbladet, issuing 6 out of 6 stars, as well as in Glåmdalen who already called it as "album of the year". Furthermore, the album received favourable reviews in the Norwegian newspapers VG ("die throw" 5), Bergens Arbeiderblad (album of the week), Nordlandsposten (album of the week), Fædrelandsvennen and Harstad Tidende. It received mediocre to above-average reviews by Bergens Tidende and Drammens Tidende ("die throw" 4).

== Track listing ==
1. "Driftin' Away" (Eric Andersen, Rick Danko, Elizabeth Danko) – 5:13
2. "Blue Hotel" (Jonas Fjeld, Jim Sherraden) – 4:02
3. "One More Shot" (Paul Kennerley) – 3:13
4. "Mary I'm Comin' Back Home" (Andersen) – 3:42
5. "Blue River" (Andersen) – 4:49
6. "Judgement Day" (Traditional) – 2:08
7. "When Morning Comes to America" (Fjeld, Sherraden) – 4:02
8. "Wrong Side of Town" (Andersen, Fjeld, R. Danko) – 2:53
9. "Sick and Tired" (Andersen, R. Danko, Chris Kenner) – 3:48
10. "Angels in the Snow" (Andersen, Fjeld, Ole Paus) – 4:31
11. "Blaze of Glory" (Larry Keith, Danny Morrison, Johnny Slate) – 3:21
12. "Last Thing on My Mind" (Tom Paxton) – 3:46

== Personnel ==
- Rick Danko – acoustic guitar, bass guitar, double bass, vocals
- Jonas Fjeld – acoustic guitar, pedal steel, percussion, vocals
- Eric Andersen – acoustic guitar, piano, harmonica, vocals
- Rune Arnesen – drums, percussion
- Hallvard T. Bjørgum – Hardanger fiddle
- Audun Erlien – bass guitar
- Laase Hafreager – Hammond organ
- Garth Hudson – accordion
- Knut Reiersrud – guitars, piano, mandolin, harmonica
- Kristin Skaare – accordion, piano, keyboards
- Martin Lisland – backing vocals
- Solfrid Stene – backing vocals
- Hilde Kjeldsen – backing vocals
- Kristine Pettersen: backing vocals
