= Ghosts Upon the Road =

Studio album by Eric Andersen
- Released: 1989
- Genre: Folk rock
- Label: Gold Castle; Alert
- Producer: Steve Addabbo, Eric Andersen

Eric Andersen chronology
Istanbul (1985)	Ghosts Upon the Road (1989)	Stages: The Lost Album (1991)

Ghosts Upon the Road is an album by the American musician Eric Andersen, released in 1989. His first release on an American label in 12 years, it was regarded as a comeback album. Andersen had been living in Norway for many years.

== Production ==
The album was produced by Steve Addabbo and Andersen. Andy Newmark played drums on the album, and other musicians were borrowed from Suzanne Vega's band. "Ghosts Upon the Road" is a 10-minute autobiographical song; Andersen also attempted to turn it into a screenplay.

== Critical reception ==
Professional ratings
Review scores
Source	Rating
AllMusic	3/5 stars
Chicago Tribune	3/4 stars
The Encyclopedia of Popular Music	4/5 stars
MusicHound Rock: The Essential Album Guide	4/5 stars
Ottawa Citizen	4/5 stars
The Rolling Stone Album Guide	4.5/5 stars

The Ottawa Citizen noted that "pastoral settings and Celtic inflections flirt with Andersen's brutal confessions." The Los Angeles Times concluded that, "if mental fragility and the spectral fading of the past are the twin shadows of Ghosts Upon the Road, Andersen also points to sources of brightness and healing in songs about love and the calmer, quieter life he leads in Norway." The Chicago Tribune stated that the album "showcases Andersen's considerable talents as a contemporary folk/pop songwriter."

The New York Times praised the title track, writing that "the swirl of personal reminiscence and myth makes for a poignant personal evocation of the era and its romantic icons." The Windsor Star deemed Ghost Upon the Road "one of the year's most satisfying albums."

The Rolling Stone Album Guide called Ghosts Upon the Road "one of the best albums of the 1980s."

== Track listing ==
No.	Title	Length
1.	"Belgian Bar"
2.	"Spanish Steps"
3.	"It Starts with a Lie"
4.	"Trouble in Paris"
5.	"Listen to the Rain"
6.	"Ghosts Upon the Road"
7.	"Too Many Times (I Will Try)"
8.	"Carry Me Away"
9.	"Six Senses of Darkness"
10.	"Irish Lace"
