= Tight in the Night =

Studio album by Eric Andersen
- Released: 1985
- Studio: Grant Avenue, EMI
- Genre: Rock
- Label: Wind and Sand
- Producer: Eric Andersen

Eric Andersen chronology
Midnight Son (1984)	Tight in the Night (1985)	Istanbul (1985)

Tight in the Night is an album by the American musician Eric Andersen, released in 1985. It was first released in Europe. Andersen supported it with a North American tour.

== Production ==
The album was financed and produced by Andersen. It was recorded at EMI Studios, in Stockholm, and at Grant Avenue Studio, in Hamilton, Ontario. Andersen was backed on some of the tracks by the Canadian band the Rockin' Deltoids; he decided to incorporate rock styles after playing with bands in New York City and Woodstock. "Walking in My Sleep" is about a man who has relationships end all over the world. "Girls of Denmark", written in Rimini, Italy, was inspired by Red Brigade chaos in Milan.

== Critical reception ==
Professional ratings
Review scores
Source	Rating
The Encyclopedia of Popular Music	3/5 stars
New York Daily News	3/4 stars

The Ann Arbor News called the album "sinewy guitar- and keyboard-dominated rock". The Buffalo News considered "Girls of Denmark" and "What Will You Do with My Heart" to be the best songs. The New York Daily News praised Andersen's "slightly hoarsely, nicely non-sentimental voice." The Tennessean noted the "more urgent rasp and ... snappier pop production."

== Track listing ==
No.	Title	Length
1.	"Walking in My Sleep"
2.	"Lovin' You, Lovin' Me"
3.	"Jonah"
4.	"Girls of Denmark"
5.	"Someone in My Life"
6.	"What Will You Do with My Heart"
7.	"She Can Dance"
8.	"Straight Life"
9.	"Count on You"
10.	"Tight in the Night"
