= Ridin' on the Blinds =

Studio album by Rick Danko, Jonas Fjeld and Eric Andersen
- Released: 1994
- Genre: Folk rock
- Label: Grappa Musikkforlag
- Producer: Rick Danko, Jonas Fjeld, Eric Andersen

Rick Danko, Jonas Fjeld and Eric Andersen chronology
Danko/Fjeld/Andersen (1991)	Ridin' on the Blinds (1994)

Ridin' on the Blinds is the second and final album by the folk-rock trio of Rick Danko, Jonas Fjeld and Eric Andersen, released in 1994.

Among the tracks are tributes to Paul Butterfield ("Every Man Is His Own Hero") and Richard Manuel ("All Creation"), covers of the Band's "Twilight" and Tom Paxton's "Bottle of Wine", and a duet between Andersen and guest vocalist Kirsten Berg on Richard Thompson's "Dimming of the Day".

The group also covered songs from their respective solo careers, including Andersen's "Come Runnin' Like a Friend", "Lie with Me", and "Baby, I'm Lonesome", and Fjeld's "Your Eyes".

There were plans for a third album, but Rick Danko's 1997 arrest for drug possession put these plans on hold temporarily. After Danko's December 1999 death, these plans were put permanently to rest. The remaining duo toured with Danko's bandmate Garth Hudson in 2001 behind the expanded reissue of their debut, and no further albums have come.

== Track listing ==
1. "Ridin' on the Blinds" (Eric Andersen, Rick Danko, Jonas Fjeld) – 3:49
2. "Twilight" (Robbie Robertson)§ – 2:59
3. "Dimming of the Day" (Richard Thompson) – 3:11
4. "Ragtop" (Andersen, Danko, Fjeld) – 3:30
5. "Come Runnin' Like a Friend" (Andersen) – 6:11
6. "Women 'Cross the River" (David Olney) – 3:28
7. "Lie With Me" (Andersen) – 4:14
8. "All Creation" (Andersen, Danko) – 3:34
9. "Outside Track" (Henry Lawson, G. W. Hallow) – 4:07
10. "Every Man Is His Own Hero" (Andersen, Danko, Fjeld) – 4:48
11. "Baby, I'm Lonesome" (Andersen) – 3;41
12. "Your Eyes" (Fjeld, Jim Sherraden) – 4:38
13. "Bottle of Wine" (Tom Paxton) – 2:44
14. "Keep This Love Alive" (Andersen, Danko) – 4:29

§ Danko claimed co-authorship of "Twilight" off and on from 1976 until his death in 1999.

== Personnel ==
- Rick Danko – lead and backing vocals, bass, guitars
- Jonas Fjeld – lead and backing vocals, guitars
- Eric Andersen – lead and backing vocals, guitars, B-3 organ, keyboards

with

- Rune Arnesen – drums, percussion
- Kirsten B. Berg – lead and backing vocals
- Halvard T. Bjørgum – hardanger fiddle
- Bent Bredesen – guitar
- Jørun Bøgeberg – acoustic bass, mandolin
- Garth Hudson – keyboards, accordion
- Tone Hulbækmo – medieval harp, footpump organ
- Hans F. Jakobsen – medieval bagpipes, flutes, Finnish lap harp
- Ed Kaercher – guitar, backing vocals
- Frode Larsen – harmonica
- Lillebjørn Nilsen – banjo, dulcimer, Jews harp
- Oslo Gospel Choir
- Knut Reiersrud – guitars, harmonica, Turkish saz, langeleik, mandolin
- Kristin Skaare – accordion, keyboards, harmonium
- Georgia Slim – piano
- Bugge Wesseltoft – keyboards
- Marianne Berg, Audun Erlien, Ingar Helgesen, Mariann Lisand, Per Ø. Sørensen and Liz T. Vespestad – backing vocals
