= Chatham County Line =

American bluegrass musical group

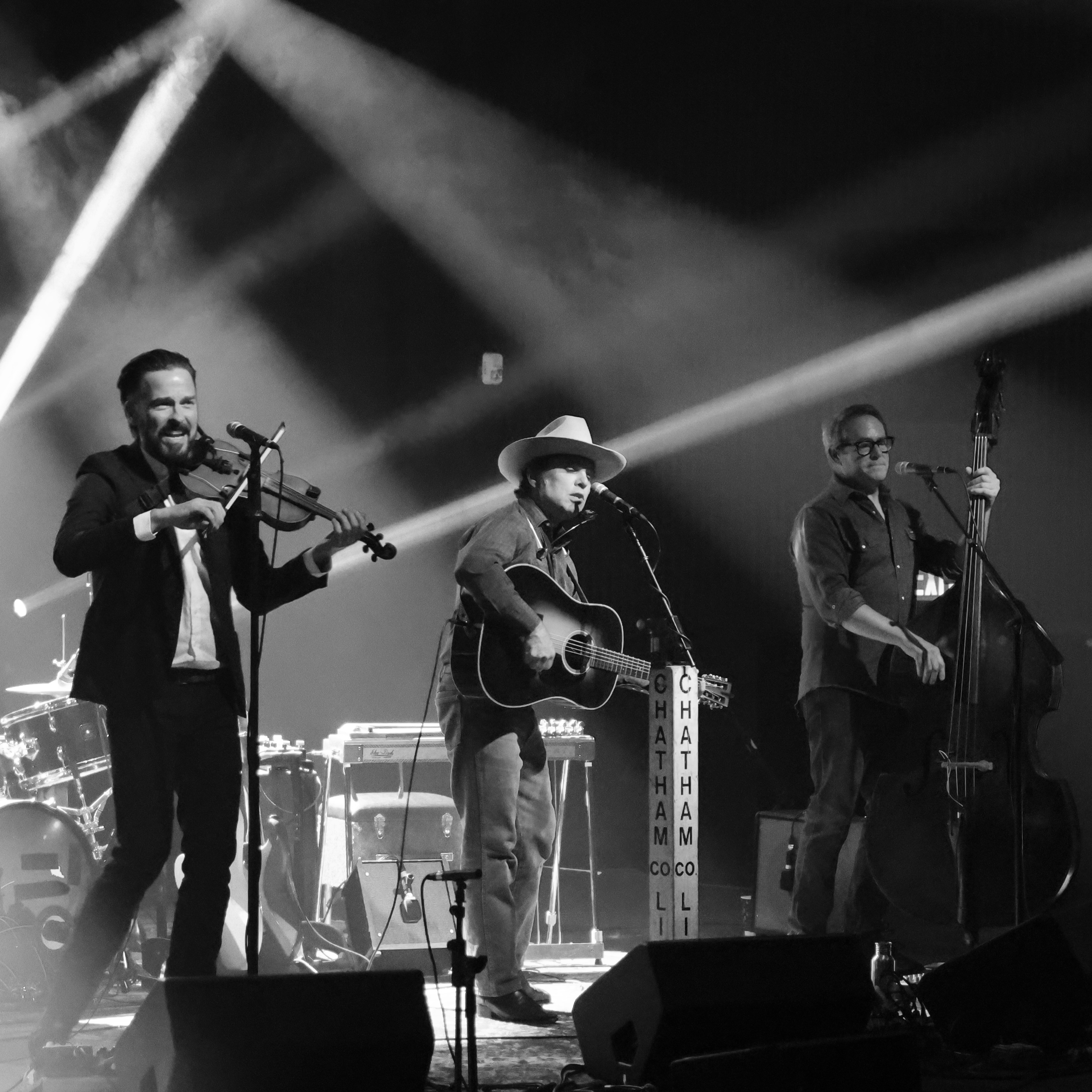
- John Teer, Dave Wilson and Greg Readling

Background information
- Origin: Raleigh, North Carolina, United States
- Genres: Americana, bluegrass
- Years active: 1999–present
- Labels: Yep Roc Records (current); Bonfire Records; Sony Norway
- Members: Dave Wilson; John Teer; Greg Readling

Chatham County Line, a.k.a. "CCL", is an American Americana musical group. Formed in Raleigh, North Carolina, in 1999 from members of the band Stillhouse, the band has released ten albums on the Yep Roc label (whom they were linked with by the producer Chris Stamey), and have become popular in Europe as well as their native United States.

The members met in 1996 when lead singer-songwriter Dave Wilson led the Country-Rock band Stillhouse. Wilson is the son of Charlotte poet Dede Wilson and was living in the Blue House, a Raleigh crash pad and romper room for the area's hottest young musicians. The other original CCL members are mandolin/fiddle player John Teer, upright bassist/pedal steel wiz Greg Readling, and banjo picker Chandler Holt (since retired). Wilson and Readling were playing in the Blue House as "Stillhouse" when Teer and Holt became intrigued "to hear these guys playing original country music that didn't suck" as Holt recalls. Holt and Teer befriended Wilson at the Blue House and began sitting in with the band. Wilson, over a beer one night, asked the others if they were interested in starting a bluegrass band.

Chatham County Line frequently opened shows for Tift Merritt's band The Carbines as both Greg and Jay Brown (original Stillhouse Bassist) were members. Chris Stamey saw them open a show, offered to record them, and landed them a record deal with Yep Roc Records. The band then went on to create seven original studio albums, one live film/audio collection, and an album of covers: Chatham County Line in 2003, Route 23 in 2005, Speed of the Whippoorwill in 2006, IV in 2008, Wildwood in 2010, Sight & Sound in 2012, Tightrope in 2014, Autumn in 2016 and Sharing the Covers in 2019 before the retirement of original member Chandler Holt. The Album Strange Fascination arrived in 2020 and features Sharon Van Etten singing harmonies on the title track. The band, which used to perform gathered around a single microphone, now performs live with a drummer and features pedal steel and electric guitar on stage.

The band's latest album Hiyo was recorded at Asheville’s Echo Mountain and was co-produced by Dave Wilson and Rachael Moore, who they met on the set of George & Tammy, where Moore worked as a music producer. Chatham County Line portrayed the Nashville A-Team on the series George & Tammy, with Teer as Harold Bradley and Wilson as Pig Robbins.

In addition to their eleven solo studio and live albums, Chatham County Line have recorded three albums with Norwegian country musician Jonas Fjeld and were additionally brought on as the backing band on Winter Stories Fjeld's collaborative album with American singer Judy Collins. To date, the band have achieved four number one albums on the Top Bluegrass Albums chart.

== Discography ==
Title	Album details	Peak chart positions	
Title	Album details	US Grass	US Heat
Chatham County Line	Release date: June 3, 2003; Label: Bonfire Records	—	—
Route 23	Release date: February 22, 2005; Label: Yep Roc Records	12	—
Speed of the Whippoorwill	Release date: May 30, 2006; Label: Yep Roc Records	13	—
Amerikabesøk (with Jonas Fjeld)	Release date: February 26, 2007; Label: Sony Music Norway		
IV	Release date: March 4, 2008; Label: Yep Roc Records	6	—
Brother of Song (with Jonas Fjeld)	Release date: February 23, 2009; Label: Sony Music Norway		
Wildwood	Release date: July 13, 2010; Label: Yep Roc Records	3	33
Sight & Sound	Release date: July 10, 2012; Label: Yep Roc Records	10	—
Western Harmonies (with Jonas Fjeld)	Release date: October 7, 2013; Label: Sony Music Norway		
Tightrope	Release date: May 20, 2014; Label: Yep Roc Records	3	47
Autumn	Release date: September 2, 2016; Label: Yep Roc Records	1	—
Sharing The Covers	Release date: March 8, 2019; Label: Yep Roc Records	1	—
Winter Stories (with Judy Collins and Jonas Fjeld)	Release date: November 29, 2019; Label: Cleopatra Records	1	—
Strange Fascination	Release date: April 24, 2020; Label: Yep Roc Records	1	—
Hiyo	Release date: January 26, 2024; Label: Yep Roc Records	1	—
"—" denotes releases that did not chart
