= Ruth Palmer =

British musician

Ruth Palmer is a British violinist.

== Career ==
- She graduated from the Royal Academy of Music in 2000 with 1st class honours, the 'Roth Prize' for best violin final recital and the 'Lesley Alexander Award' for excellence. She won a Hattori Foundation Junior Award in 1999/2000
- She went on to study at the Royal College of Music under Dr. Felix Andrievsky, who had been present at the first performance of Shostakovich's 1st Violin Concerto. In 2005 Ruth was made the first ever recipient of the prestigious Ritterman Junior Fellowship at the RCM, having previously been the Mills Williams Junior Fellow in 2004.

In 2004 she gave the world première of Irony of Fate, a ballet for one female dancer with solo violinist on-stage created by Rafael Bonachela, Ballet Rambert's Associate Choreographer for the Madrid International Day of Dance 2004, using the solo violin partita of Vytautas Barkauskas.

She debuted at Wigmore Hall In London, and she has given recitals at the Ravinia Festival in Chicago, Royal Opera House, Edinburgh Festival, Cheltenham International Festival of Music, Queen Elizabeth Hall, Purcell Room, Teatro Albeniz Madrid, Munich Opera House Gala and Snape Maltings.

=== First Shostakovich CD and DVD ===
In 2006, her début CD "Shostakovich Violin Concerto No 1 & Violin Sonata" was released, with the Philharmonia Orchestra conducted by Ben Wallfisch, and recorded on the "Turkish" Guarneri Del Gesu (1737) loaned to her by Charles Beare. The BBC had commissioned a documentary about her preparation for this called A People's Music and a DVD version of this is included with the CD.

This was rated 5-stars by the Independent on Sunday, and 4-stars by The Times and The Guardian. The review in International Record Review described her performance of the Concerto as "a performance which has astounded me...it a truly magnificent account" and on the Sonata commented "although two recordings exist of David Oistrakh playing this work (with Sviatoslav Richter and with Shostakovich himself – the last recorded in the composer's apartment), Palmer's recording is the finest all-round I have experienced – indeed, her intellectual understanding of this extremely difficult work is wholly exceptional, and her musical acuity is admirable".

It was selected as Orchestral Disk of the Month in Classic FM Review who gave it 5 stars and declared "for my money, this is the Shostakovich centenary's most outstanding release"

She was profiled by Norman Lebrecht in the Evening Standard in Feb 2007 who commented that of the seven new releases of the concerto during 2006 Palmer's "got the best reviews. At fifth hearing, months later, it unfolds further layers of expressive depth. Her pacing is compelling from the opening phrase, and each stylistic option, every whisper and flutter, has the kind of logic that makes you wonder how the piece could ever have been played otherwise. It is both gravely authoritative and unmistakably personal."

=== Subsequent work ===
She also performed Vivaldi's The Four Seasons at Kenwood House for Classic FM Live.

In 2007 she performed the Brahms violin concerto and the Elgar Violin Concerto and gave her 3rd Wigmore Hall recital on 14 May as well as performing on Radio 3. In October 2007 she gave the world premiere of the "Durham Concerto" by Jon Lord in Durham Cathedral with the Royal Liverpool Philharmonic Orchestra

== International recognition ==
On 23 February 2007, Palmer made a guest appearance (reported in the UK, Continental Europe, Asia, America and elsewhere) during a press conference at Christie's to play the 1729 Stradivarius violin Solomon, ex-Lambert which was auctioned in New York on 2 April for $2.7M compared to the estimated $1–1.5M.

Palmer was nominated for a classical BRIT Award for her Shostakovich recording in the "Young British Classical Performer" category along with Nicky Spence and Nicola Benedetti. She was invited to perform at the launch of the awards, described as "exceptional violinist Ruth Palmer" and her presence was reported around the world. The co-Chair of the Awards Committee said of her "she experienced the typical struggle to be heard. But she took many courageous and unusual steps... Her persistence and artistic accomplishment have clearly paid off!" She won the award on 3 May 2007 at a ceremony in the Royal Albert Hall.

She performed the Bartók Solo Sonata at the Crossing Border Festival, Royal Theatre, The Hague, in 2007 and the World Premiere of the Sinatra Suite by Gwilym Simcock at the World Economic Forum 2008

== Relevant links ==
- Official website
- Ballet Rambert
- Irony of Fate
- Quartz CD and A People's Music
- Long review of the Quartz CD/DVD
- Profile in The Guardian The DIY violinist 3 May 2007
- Profile in The Times Violinist who made own album is rewarded with Classic BRITs win 4 May 2007
