= Thirsty Boots =

Folksong by Eric Andersen

Song by Eric Andersen

from the album 'Bout Changes 'n' Things
- Released: 1965
- Genre: folk
- Length: 5:55
- Label: Vanguard
- Songwriter: Eric Andersen

"Thirsty Boots" is a civil-rights-era folksong by American singer-songwriter Eric Andersen that first appeared on his 1966 album 'Bout Changes 'n' Things. According to the album's liner notes, the song "was written to a civil rights worker-friend. Having never gone down to Mississippi myself, I wrote the song about coming back."

== Cover versions ==
The song, one of Andersen's best known, has been covered by artists such as Judy Collins, John Denver, Anne Murray, and The Kingston Trio. In various stage appearances, Collins has claimed that Andersen wrote the song's last verse on a matchbook cover while in her bathroom.. Eric Andersen tells this story himself in the documentary Greenwich Village: Music That Defined a Generation. Bob Dylan also recorded this song for his 1970 album Self Portrait, but it did not make the final cut; however, it was featured on 2013's The Bootleg Series Vol. 10: Another Self Portrait (1969–1971), and also released as a single to the album.

Andersen has stated in interviews that Phil Ochs encouraged him to finish the song, and later recordings of "Boots" were dedicated to the late folksinger.
