= Eric Andersen =

American singer-songwriter

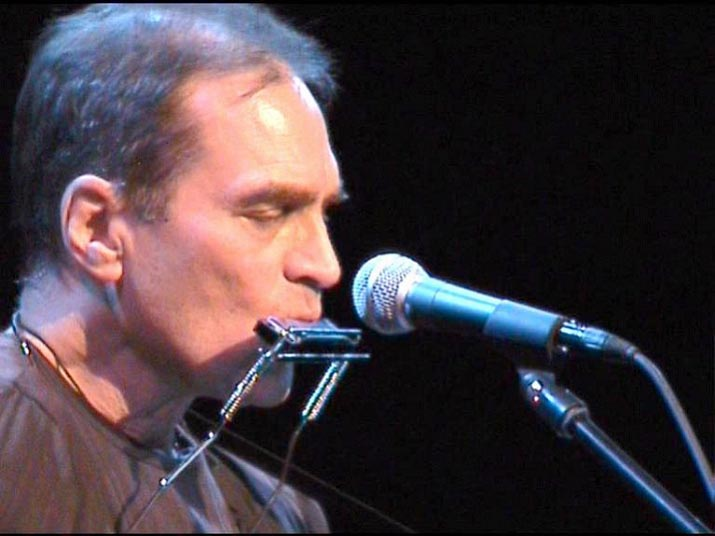

Background information
- Born: February 14, 1943 (age 83); Pittsburgh, Pennsylvania, U.S.
- Genres: Folk music; folk rock; blues
- Occupation: Singer-songwriter
- Instruments: Guitar; harmonica; piano; keyboard; vocals
- Years active: 1963–present
- Website: ericandersen.com

Eric Andersen (born February 14, 1943) is an American folk music singer-songwriter, who has written songs recorded by Johnny Cash, Bob Dylan, Judy Collins, Linda Ronstadt, the Grateful Dead, Rick Nelson, and many others. Early in his career, in the 1960s, he was part of the Greenwich Village folk scene. After two decades and sixteen albums of solo performance, he formed Danko/Fjeld/Andersen with Rick Danko and Jonas Fjeld, which released two albums in the early 1990s.

== Personal history ==
Eric Andersen's grandfather emigrated from Norway. Eric Andersen was born in Pittsburgh, Pennsylvania, and grew up in Snyder, New York, a suburb of Buffalo. Elvis Presley made an impression on him when 15-year-old Andersen saw him perform. He moved to Boston and then San Francisco, where he met Tom Paxton, finally settling in New York City at the height of the Greenwich Village folk movement.

Andersen was at one point married to former Cambridge folksinger Debbie Green, who contributed guitar, piano, and backing vocal performances to various records Andersen released between 1965 and 1975. He was a resident of Woodstock, New York, between 1975 and 1983. He then moved to Oslo, Norway, and maintained a residence in New York City. He was cohabiting and has four children with the Norwegian visual artist Unni Askeland. He currently lives in the Netherlands. He married Dutch social scientist and singer Inge Andersen in 2006. He has a daughter Sari (with Debbie Green), who contributed backing vocal performances to his Memory of the Future album.

In 2022, Andersen was awarded an honorary doctorate degree from Hobart and William Smith Colleges.

== Musical career ==
=== 1964–1969: Folk breakthrough ===
In the early 1960s, Andersen was part of the Greenwich Village folk scene in New York City. His best-known songs from the 1960s folk era are "Violets of Dawn", "Come to My Bedside", and "Thirsty Boots" (the latter recorded by Judy Collins, Bob Dylan, and John Denver amongst others).

In 1964, Andersen made his debut at Gerdes Folk City in a live audition for Vanguard Records. In 1965 he released his first Vanguard album Today Is the Highway. In 1966 he made his Newport Folk Festival debut. The Beatles' manager Brian Epstein was in the process of becoming his manager when he died. Joni Mitchell cites Andersen as the source of her open tunings.

=== 1970s: Singer-songwriter era ===
Andersen took part in the Festival Express tour across Canada in 1970 with the Grateful Dead, Janis Joplin, The Band, Delaney Bramlett and others.

Andersen signed with Columbia in 1972 and issued his most commercially successful album, Blue River, on that label. From that album, the song "Is It Really Love At All?" is the most popular. The master tapes of his follow-up album Stages were lost (until 1989) before the album could be released, resulting in the loss of much of the momentum he had gained with Blue River.

Andersen parted ways with Columbia and recorded sporadically for a number of labels throughout the remainder of the 1970s and into the early 1980s. In 1975 he performed with Arlen Roth at the opening show of Bob Dylan's Rolling Thunder Revue at Gerde's Folk City and again in Niagara Falls.

In the late 1970s, Andersen was also a member of the Woodstock Mountains Revue, a folk group that also featured Artie Traum, Happy Traum and John Sebastian.

=== 1980s: Europe ===
Andersen fell into obscurity for a number of years for audiences in United States. After moving to Europe, he recorded three albums, including Midnight Son, Tight in the Night and Istanbul. Andersen established his own company, Wind and Sand Records, to sell his music through mail order.

Andersen reemerged in 1989 with a new album, Ghosts Upon the Road. Though the album did only modestly well, it was widely praised and placed on a number of critics' year-end "best of" lists. The title track was a 10 1/2-minute autobiographical song that Andersen wrote about when he lived in Beacon Hill, Boston, and moved to New York City in 1964.

=== Stages: The Lost Album ===
The Stages tapes were found nearly two decades after they had been lost. Forty boxes consisting of the original master tapes were found October 1989 in the vaults at Columbia Records in New York. The album was recorded after Blue River and featured guest artists Leon Russell, Joan Baez and Dan Fogelberg, among others. It was issued in 1991 as Stages: The Lost Album.

=== 1990s: Danko/Fjeld/Andersen ===
At this point in his career, Andersen was living in Oslo, Norway, and, in the early 1990s, he joined the trio Danko/Fjeld/Andersen, with Rick Danko (the Band) and the Norwegian singer-songwriter Jonas Fjeld. The trio recorded three albums and performed together for nine years.

=== 1998–present: Late solo work ===
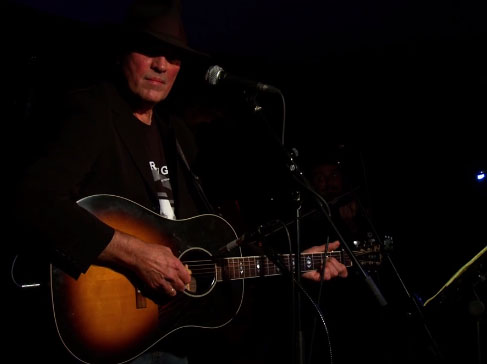
Andersen in 2013

In 1998, Andersen released his first solo album in a decade, Memory of the Future. Praised as "dreamy and introspective", the album was followed two years later by You Can't Relive The Past, which included original blues numbers as well as a selection of songs co-written with Townes Van Zandt.

A double album, Beat Avenue, followed in 2003. Besides mostly rock-dominated ballads, the album's 26-minute title track is a jazzy beat poem relating his experiences among San Francisco's beat community of artists on the day of President John F. Kennedy's assassination.

Andersen's next albums, The Street Was Always There (2004) and Waves (2005), were both produced by multi-instrumentalist Robert Aaron. In addition to covers of his own songs, the albums featured new versions of classics by his sixties contemporaries and friends, including David Blue, Bob Dylan, Richard Fariña, Tim Hardin, Peter La Farge, Fred Neil, Phil Ochs, Buffy Sainte-Marie, Paul Siebel, Patrick Sky, Tom Paxton, John Sebastian, Happy Traum, Lou Reed, and Tom Rush. His next album, Blue Rain, released in 2007, was his first live album. It was recorded in Norway and contains a blend of blues, jazz and folk.

In 2011, Andersen released his second live album, The Cologne Concert, with Michele Gazich (Mary Gauthier, Mark Olson) on violin and Inge Andersen (his wife) on backing vocals.

In 2013, Andersen performed in Greenwich Village: Music That Defined a Generation, a feature-length documentary about the Greenwich Village music scene, which was issued on DVD in November.

In August 2014, Andersen released a limited-edition double 10" vinyl record, "Shadow and Light of Albert Camus", featuring Michele Gazich on violin and piano, with cover design paintings of Oliver Jordan.

In April 2017, Andersen phoned Joni Mitchell, who was at home recovering from a serious long-term illness, and suggested bringing his band to her house for some music-making. (Andersen was the guitarist who had taught Mitchell open-G tuning.) Mitchell was greatly cheered by having music in her home and in her life again, and as a result of Andersen's visit was inspired to start hosting regular music sessions, which became known as "Joni Jams". The music sessions assisted her recovery, and she was able to return to live performance in 2022.

In May 2017, Andersen released his album Mingle with the Universe: The Worlds of Lord Byron, featuring Inge Andersen (backing vocals), Michele Gazich (violin), Giorgio Curcettie (oud, bass, guitar), Cheryl Prashker (percussion) and Paul Zoontjes (aka nl:Simon Keats, piano) with cover design paintings of Oliver Jordan. In December 2017, the album Silent Angel: The Fire and Ashes of Heinrich Böll was released celebrating the centenary of the writer Heinrich Böll's birth.

In March 2018, Sony/Legacy Recordings issued The Essential Eric Andersen, a 42-track double CD release covering fifty years of his recorded history from Today is the Highway on to The Cologne Concert album and unreleased New York recordings.

A documentary about Eric Andersen, entitled The Songpoet, premiered at The Copenhagen Music Film Festival on September 13, 2019. Set against the cultural landscapes of his 50-year artistic journey, the film depicts an intimate portrait of Andersen—writing, recording, and performing today and reflecting on his life's work. The film was produced by Toward Castle Films and Skipping Stone Pictures. Beginning in April 2021 The Songpoet was made available for TV broadcast in the United States by American Public Television, and a free stream of the full documentary became available at the Public Broadcasting Service (PBS) website.

In June 2020, Y&T Music issued Woodstock under the Stars, a collection featuring a 36-track triple CD drawn from concerts, a webcast and studio sessions recorded between 1991 and 2011. The performances feature special guests Rick Danko, John Sebastian, Garth Hudson, Eric Bazilian, Happy Traum, Artie Traum, Inge Andersen (singer-songwriter, Eric Andersen's wife and harmony singer), Joe Flood, Jonas Fjeld, Gary Burke and Robert Aaron) with cover design paintings of Oliver Jordan.

In October 2022, Y&T Music issued Tribute To A Songpoet: Songs of Eric Andersen, a collection of 42 songs on a triple CD with a cover design painting of Oliver Jordan featuring new (and some vintage) recordings and interpretations of his songs by an eclectic group of artists with musical and personal connections to him. The artists include Bob Dylan, Lucy Kaplansky, Albert Lee, Scarlet Rivera, Willie Nile, Elliott Murphy, Eric Bazilian, Larry Campbell, Mary Chapin Carpenter, Janis Ian, Robert Aaron, Steve Addabbo, John Gorka, Happy Traum, Amy Helm, Linda Ronstadt, Lenny Kaye, Rick Danko and many others.

In February 2023, Appaloosa Records issued Foolish Like the Flowers, a live album recorded in Spaziomusica, Italy featuring Scarlet Rivera on violin, Paolo Ercoli on dobro, Cheryl Prashker on percussion and Inge Andersen on backing vocals.

In November 2024, EARecords issued Eric Andersen In (Spoken) Pieces. The album is a collection and assemblage of his past and present longer-spoken (song) narratives.

In February 2025, EARecords issued Blue River (Live in Tokyo) an album with Michele Gazich (violin) and Inge Andersen (backing vocals) recorded at Billboard Live, Tokyo, Japan in 2012.

In April 2025, Andersen released a new studio album Dance of Love and Death, containing 17 recordings of new songs and featuring special guest musicians including Lenny Kaye, Larry Campbell, Eric Lee, Joyce Andersen, Tony Garnier, Michele Gazich, Inge Andersen, Robin Batteau, Mark Dann, Abby Newton, Mike Visceglia, Jagoda, Cheryl Prashker and Wyatt Offit. The album was produced by Steve Addabbo and the liner notes were written by Anthony DeCurtis and Lenny Kaye.

== Musical legacy ==
In his lengthy career, Andersen has issued more than 30 albums to which many artists have contributed, including Joan Baez, Dan Fogelberg, Al Kooper, Willie Nile, Joni Mitchell, Lou Reed, Leon Russell, Richard Thompson, Rick Danko, Garth Hudson, Eric Bazilian, Arlen Roth, Tony Garnier, Howie Epstein, and many others. His songs have been recorded by artists all over the world, including the Blues Project, Johnny Cash, Judy Collins, Peter, Paul & Mary, the Mitchell Trio, John Denver, The Dillards, Ricky Nelson, Fairport Convention, Grateful Dead, Ratdog (Bob Weir), Bob Dylan, Linda Ronstadt, Gillian Welch, Eilen Jewell Mary-Chapin Carpenter, Françoise Hardy, Rick Danko, Linda Thompson, The Kingston Trio, and Pete Seeger.

Richard Harrington, music critic for The Washington Post, wrote, "No other songwriter born in the generation between World War II and Korea has better explored the insistence of love, whether it be sensible or hopeless, beseeched or betrayed."

== Awards ==
In 2003, Andersen won the Premio Tenco award with Patti Smith in San Remo, Italy, the country’s most prestigious songwriting award.

== Writings ==
In 1999 Andersen wrote an essay entitled "My Beat Journal" for the Rolling Stone Book of the Beats. That same year he published an article in National Geographic Traveler entitled "Coastal Norway" .

In 2009, Andersen contributed an essay entitled "The Danger Zone" to the Naked Lunch @ 50: Anniversary Essays, a book volume edited by Oliver Harris and Ian MacFadyen devoted to William S. Burroughs’ Naked Lunch, considered one of the landmark publications in the history of American literature.

Andersen wrote the lyric texts, composed music, and recorded songs for the painter Oliver Jordan's Albert Camus exhibition called "Paintings out of Revolt". This exhibition first took place for the Camus centenary in Aix-en-Provence in 2013, and was at the Rheinisches Landesmuseum Bonn, Germany, during mid-2014.

In 2013, Andersen wrote the liner notes for The Essential Pete Seeger for Sony/Legacy Records.

== Discography ==
- Today Is the Highway (Vanguard, 1965)
- 'Bout Changes 'n' Things (Vanguard, 1966)
- 'Bout Changes 'n' Things Take 2 (Vanguard, 1967)
- More Hits From Tin Can Alley (Vanguard 1968)
- Single: Think About It / So Hard To Fall (Vanguard, 1968)
- A Country Dream (Vanguard, 1969)
- Avalanche (Warner Bros., 1969)
- Eric Andersen (Warner Bros., December 1969)
- Non-album single: Sitting In The Sunshine (co-written by Carole King and Toni Stern)/Sunshine And Flowers (1970) (Warner Brothers)
- Non-album single: Born Again/Rocky Mountain Red (written by Michael Chain) (1971) (Warner Brothers) – ("Born Again" was performed on "The Johnny Cash Show" in 1971.)
- Blue River (Columbia, 1972)
- Be True To You (Arista, 1975)
- Sweet Surprise (Arista, 1976)
- Midnight Son (CBS, 1980)
- Tight in the Night (CBS, 1985)
- Istanbul (EMI, 1985) original soundtrack
- Ghosts Upon the Road (Gold Castle, 1989)
- Stages: The Lost Album (Columbia, 1991) [mostly recorded in 1972–73, the master tapes were then lost, with three brand new tracks]
- Danko/Fjeld/Andersen – Rick Danko, Jonas Fjeld & Eric Andersen (Mercury, 1991)
- Ridin' on the Blinds – Rick Danko, Jonas Fjeld & Eric Andersen (Grappa, 1994)
- Kerouac: Kicks Joy Darkness – Various Artists (1997)
- Memory of the Future (Normal, 1998)
- You Can't Relive The Past (Norske Gram, 2000)
- One More Shot – Rick Danko, Jonas Fjeld & Eric Andersen (BMG Norway, 2001) (2 CDs)
- Beat Avenue (Appleseed, 2002) (2 CDs)
- Street Was Always There: Great American Song Series, Vol. 1 (Appleseed, 2004)
- Waves: Great American Song Series, Vol. 2 (Appleseed, 2005)
- Blue Rain – live (Appleseed, 2007)
- So Much on My Mind: The Anthology (1969–1980) (Raven, 2007)
- Avalanche (re-issue) (Warner Bros., 2008)
- The Cologne Concert - live (Meyer, 2011)
- Shadow and Light of Albert Camus (Meyer, 2014)
- Be True to You / Sweet Surprise (re-issue) (BGO, 2017)
- Mingle with the Universe: The Worlds of Lord Byron (Meyer, 2017)
- Silent Angel: The Fire and Ashes of Heinrich Böll (Meyer, 2017)
- The Essential Eric Andersen (Sony/Legacy, 2018) (2 CDs)
- Rolling Coconut Revue Japan Concert 1977 - live (Super Fuji Discs, 2020)
- Woodstock under the Stars (Y&T Music, 2020) (3 CDs)
- Tribute To A Songpoet: Songs of Eric Andersen (Y&T Music, 2022) (3 CDs)
- Foolish Like the Flowers - live (Appaloosa Records, 2023)
- Eric Andersen In (Spoken) Pieces (EARecords, 2024)
- Blue River (Live in Tokyo) (New Shot Records (H'Art), 2025)
- Dance of Love and Death (Y&T Music, 2025) (2 CDs)

== Covers ==
- Is It Really Love At All - Jericho Harp (United Artists, 1977)

== Filmography and DVD appearances ==
In 1965, Eric Andersen starred in the Andy Warhol movie Space, in which he sang.

In 1974, Andersen appeared in the Les Blank documentary A Poem is a Naked Person, which covered three years in the life of rock star Leon Russell. The film remained unreleased for forty years but was finally released in 2015.

In 1984, Andersen appeared as a guest in a film documentary about Phil Ochs called Chords of Fame and sang the Ochs' song, "When I'm Gone".

In 1985, Andersen wrote original music for the movie Istanbul, starring Brad Dourif.

In 2011, filmmakers Paul Lamont and Scott Sackett began production on The Songpoet, a documentary exploring Eric Andersen's uncompromising 50-year artistic journey. The film has been finished in February 2019 and had its premiere at The Copenhagen Music Film Festival, September 13, 2019.

- Judy Collins Wildflower Festival – Judy Collins, Eric Andersen, Tom Rush & Arlo Guthrie (2003) (2 DVDs)
- Joni Mitchell: Woman of Heart and Mind (2003) (DVD)
- Festival Express – Various Artists (2004) (2 DVDs)
- Festival Express – Various Artists (2014) (Blu-ray, reissue)
- Buffy Sainte-Marie: A Multimedia Life (2006) (DVD)
- Judy Collins & Friends, Live in San Diego, 2002 – Judy Collins, Eric Andersen, Tom Rush & Arlo Guthrie (2012) (2 DVDs, reissue)
- Greenwich Village: Music that defined a generation (2013) (DVD)
- Bob Dylan: Roads Rapidly Changing – In & Out of the Folk Revival 1961–1965 (2015) (DVD)
- A Poem is a Naked Person – Leon Russell & Various Artists (2016) (DVD, Blu-ray)

== Sources ==
- The Rolling Stone Encyclopedia of Rock & Roll (Simon & Schuster, 2001).
- James Ketchell,, Rockbeatstone (August 2007).
- "Greenwich Village: Music that defined a generation" (January 2013).
- "Greenwich Village: Music that defined a generation, DVD" (November 2013).
- "Dance of Love and Death" (January 2014).
