= Stages: The Lost Album =

Studio album by Eric Andersen
- Released: April 1991
- Recorded: December 1972 – February 1973
- Genre: Folk rock
- Length: 57:51
- Label: Columbia
- Producer: Norbert Putnam, Eric Andersen, Steve Addabbo

Eric Andersen chronology
Blue River (1972)	Stages: The Lost Album (1991)	Be True to You (1975)

Professional ratings
Review scores
Source	Rating
Allmusic	]

Stages is an album by folk rock musician Eric Andersen. The album was recorded in late 1972 and early 1973, as the intended follow-up to Andersen's successful Blue River album, but before it could be released, the master tapes were somehow lost in the Columbia vaults. It wasn't until 1990 that the tapes were discovered, at which time the album was finally released. In addition to the original 1972–73 recordings, Andersen included three newly recorded songs. Guest musicians from the 1973–73 sessions included Leon Russell on organ, piano and guitar, Rick Danko on bass and background vocals, and Garth Hudson on accordion, with Dan Fogelberg and Joan Baez supplying background vocals. Shawn Colvin was a guest vocalist on the 1990 sessions.

== Track listing ==
1. "Baby, I'm Lonesome" (Andersen) – 3:17
2. "Moonchild River Song" (Andersen) – 4:20
3. "Can't Get You Out of My Life" (Andersen) – 2:54
4. "Woman, She Was Gentle" (Andersen) – 4:18
5. "Time Run Like a Freight Train" (Andersen) – 8:29
6. "It's Been a Long Time" (Andersen) – 3:21
7. "Wild Crow Blues" (Andersen) – 6:10
8. "Be True to You" (Andersen) – 3:07
9. "I Love to Sing My Ballad, Mama" (Andersen) – 2:56
10. "Dream to Rimbaud" (Andersen) – 6:23
11. "Make It Last (Angel in the Wind) (Andersen) – 4:51 ~
12. "Lie with Me" (Andersen) – 3:50 ~
13. "Soul of My Song" (Andersen, Jonas Fjeld, Willie Nile, Ole Paus) – 3:55 ~

~ Recorded in 1990 for CD release

== Personnel ==
- Eric Andersen - acoustic guitar, electric guitar, piano, harmonica, vocals
- Andy Johnson - acoustic guitar
- Leon Russell - organ, piano, guitar
- David Briggs - piano, Hammond organ, clavinet
- Rick Danko - bass guitar, background vocals
- Garth Hudson - accordion
- Pete Drake - steel guitar
- Weldon Myrick - pedal steel guitar
- Norbert Putnam - upright bass, cello
- Eddie Hinton - acoustic guitar
- Grady Martin - gut string guitar, acoustic guitar
- Joe Spivey - acoustic guitar, fiddle
- Kenny Malone - drums, percussion
- Kenneth Buttrey - drums
- Deborah Andersen - piano, background vocals
- Farrell Morris - percussion
- Steve Addabbo - synthesizer
- Eric Bazilian - mandolin, concertina, background vocals
- Tommy Cosgrove - bass guitar
- Teddy Irwin - acoustic guitar
- Mike Leech - bass
- Charlie McCoy - percussion
- Andy Newmark - drums
- Willie Nile - electric guitar
- Troy Seals - electric guitar
- Glen Spreen - Hammond organ
- Reggie Young - electric guitar
- Jonas Fjeld - acoustic guitar, electric piano
- Dan Fogelberg - background vocals
- Joan Baez - background vocals
- Shawn Colvin - background vocals
- Florence Warner - background vocals

== Production ==
- Producer: Norbert Putnam, Eric Andersen and Steve Addabbo
- Recording Engineer: Steve Addabbo, Stan Hutto, Wayne Moss, Mark Partis
- Mastering: Greg Calbi, Denny Purcell
- Art Direction: Joel Zimmerman
- Liner Notes: Anthony DeCurtis, Arthur Levy, Eric Andersen
- Photography: David Gahr, Carla Gahr
