= Jonas Fjeld =

Norwegian singer, songwriter, and guitarist

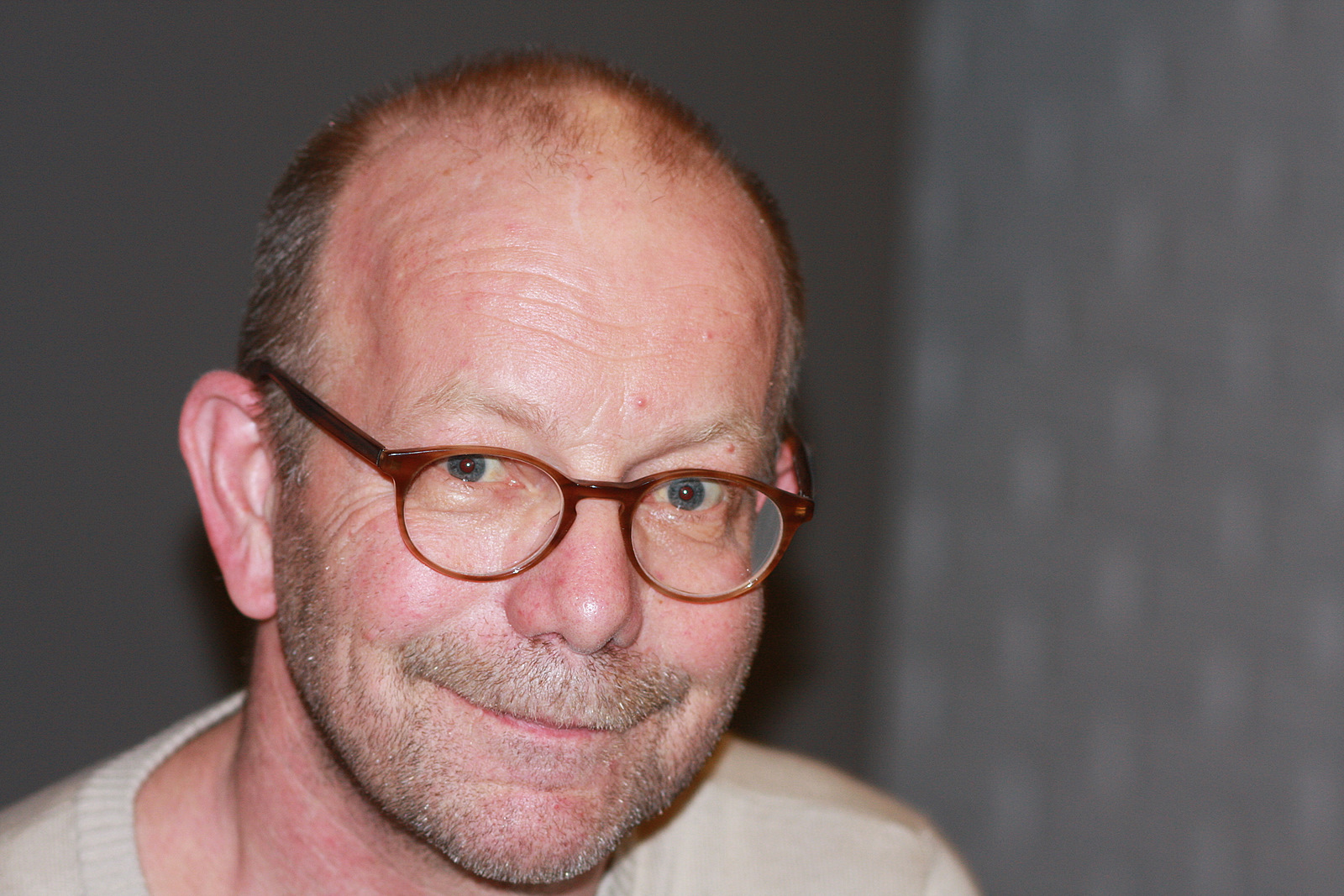
- Jonas Fjeld, 29 March 2009.

Background information
- Born: Terje Lillegård Jensen; 24 September 1952 (age 73); Bodø, Norway
- Genres: Country rock
- Occupation: Singer-songwriter
- Instrument(s): Guitar, keyboards, vocals
- Years active: 1972–present
- Website: www.facebook.com/jonasfjeld

Terje Lillegård Jensen (born 24 September 1952), commonly known by his stage name Jonas Fjeld, is a Norwegian singer, songwriter, and guitarist. He is best known in the English-speaking world for two albums recorded by Danko/Fjeld/Andersen, a collaboration with Canadian Rick Danko of The Band and American singer-songwriter Eric Andersen. Fjeld also recorded three albums with the American bluegrass group Chatham County Line.

== Biography ==
Terje Jensen was born in Bodø, but moved with his family to Drammen, Norway when he was a child. In his teenage years, he became a skilled guitarist and songwriter and formed Jonas Fjeld Rock 'n' Rolf Band along with a group of friends which included Herodes Falsk. This was a band which combined rock music and comedy, and became equally known for their outlandish costumes and antics on stage as for their music. Jensen took the stage name Jonas Fjeld from the principal character in a series of pulp fiction novels written by Øvre Richter Frich. Jonas Fjeld Rock 'n' Rolf Band got their first recording contract in 1972, and released four albums before breaking up in 1976. After parting ways, Fjeld decided to become a "serious" musician while Falsk became a full-time comedian.

Now a solo artist, Jensen considered using his real name, but eventually decided to keep the stage name Jonas Fjeld. His first solo album, Take Two Aspirins and Call Me in the Morning, was released in 1975. He switched to acoustic folk after listening to Eric Andersen's album Blue River. The album Svært nok for meg (Big Enough for Me), released in 1990, went gold in Norway. It included Engler i sneen (Angels in the Snow), a duet with Lynni Treekrem.

Fjeld was introduced to Rick Danko by Andersen in 1990. Danko, Fjeld, and Anderson started doing concerts in September 1990, and recorded the eponymous Danko/Fjeld/Andersen album in Norway in 1991. This album included a bilingual version of Engler i sneen (Angels in the Snow) and two more songs co-written by Fjeld, When Morning Comes to America and Blue Hotel.

In 1996, Fjeld began his collaboration with folk singer and poet Ole Paus, and the pair went on to release three mostly acoustic albums under the name To Rustne Herrer (English: Two Rusty Gentlemen). Fjeld was introduced to Chatham County Line in 2005, and was sufficiently impressed with them to invite them to Norway for some concerts. Fjeld and Chatham County Line toured together, and recorded two albums, both of which went gold in Norway.

In 2019, he released the album Winter Stories with the famous American singer Judy Collins and Chatham County Line. It reached number one on the Billboard Top Bluegrass Albums list, becoming the first American album ever to give Collins first place on any list, despite all the years she had been in the business. It was the first Billboard top for Fjeld and the third for Chatham County Line.

Fjeld has received four Spellemannprisen, the Norwegian equivalent of a Grammy, he was inducted into the Rockheim Hall of Fame in 2020.

== Discography ==
Jonas Fjeld Rock 'n' Rolf Band

- Jonas Fjeld Rock 'n' Rolf Band (1973)
- Pans Fløyte (1974)
- The Best of Jonas Fjeld Rock'n'Rolf Band'' (1974)
- Endelig (Uff, ikke nå igjen) (1976)

Jonas Fjeld Band

- The Tennessee Tapes (1977)
- Back in the USA (1978)
- Make Up (1979)
- Neck n' Neck (1984)
- Time and Motion (1985)

Jonas Fjeld (solo albums)

- Take Two Aspirins and Call Me in the Morning (1975)
- Jonas Fjeld's beste (1977)
- Living for the Weekend (1983)
- Neonlys på Wergeland (with Ingrid Bjoner and Ola B. Johannessen)
- Etterlatte sanger (with Sidsel Endresen)
- Svært nok for meg (1990)
- Texas Jensen (1992)
- Nerven i min sang (1994) (live)
- Beste (Jonas Fjeld (1999) (greatest hits)
- Voice on the Water (2000)
- Tidevann (2001)
- 50 fra før – 1973–83 (2002)
- Mårrakvist (2006)
- Den gamle veien (2009) (with Henning Kvitnes)
- Hjemmeseier (2011)
- De beste – 60 år i livet, 40 år på veien (2012)

Danko/Fjeld/Andersen

- Danko/Fjeld/Andersen (1991)
- Ridin' on the Blinds (1993)
- One More Shot (2001) (greatest hits)

with Chatham County Line

- Amerikabesøk (2007) (live)
- Brother of Song (2009)
- Western Harmonies (2013)

with Judy Collins and Chatham County Line

- Winter Stories (2019)

To Rustne Herrer

- To rustne herrer (1996)
- Damebesøk (1997)
- Tolv rustne strenger (2002)
- Hvis helsa holder – The Album (2016)

Bratland/Fjeld/Saugestad/Larsen

- Hank Williams på Norsk (1995)
