= Blue River (album) =

Studio album by Eric Andersen
- Released: February 1972
- Recorded: 1971
- Genre: Folk rock
- Length: 46:43
- Label: Columbia
- Producer: Norbert Putnam

Eric Andersen chronology
Eric Andersen (1969)	Blue River (1972)	Stages: The Lost Album (1972)

Professional ratings
Review scores
Source	Rating
AllMusic	5/5 stars
Christgau's Record Guide	C
The Encyclopedia of Popular Music	4/5 stars
MusicHound Rock: The Essential Album Guide	4/5 stars
The Rolling Stone Album Guide	4/5 stars

Blue River is an album by folk rock musician Eric Andersen, released in 1972. The album was reissued in 1999 by Columbia Legacy with two extra tracks.

== Production ==
The album was recorded in Nashville, Tennessee. Joni Mitchell contributes vocals on the title track, "Blue River".

== Chart performance ==
It was his first charting album, it peaked at No. 169 on the Billboard Top LPs & Tape during an eleven-week run on the chart.

== Critical reception ==
No Depression called the album's sound "subtle and incandescent," writing that producer Norbert Putnam "crafted a sound that was both sensual and spacious — at times reminiscent of Van Morrison’s Astral Weeks — and always attentive to the languid melodies and sometimes frightening intimacy of Andersen’s lyrics." MusicHound Rock: The Essential Album Guide wrote that the album "stands alongside anything that the singer-songwriter produced during the '70s." The Los Angeles Times deemed it "a delicately melodic, bittersweetly introspective song cycle that found its place within the Carole King-James Taylor-Joni Mitchell-Jackson Browne school of sensitive pop."

== Track listing ==
1. "Is It Really Love at All" (Andersen) – 5:21
2. "Pearl's Goodtime Blues" (Andersen) – 2:21
3. "Wind and Sand" (Andersen) – 4:30
4. "Faithful" (Andersen) – 3:15
5. "Blue River" (Andersen) – 4:46
6. "Florentine" (Andersen) – 3:31
7. "Sheila" (Andersen) – 4:37
8. "More Often Than Not" (David Wiffen) – 4:52
9. "Round the Bend" (Andersen) – 5:38
10. "Come To My Bedside, My Darlin'" (Andersen) – 4:58 ~*
11. "Why Don't You Love Me" (Hank Williams) – 2:54 ~*

~* = Bonus Track on CD Release (recorded during album sessions)

== Charts ==
Chart (1972)	Peak position
US Top LPs & Tape	169
Canada RPM 100	61

== Personnel ==
- Eric Andersen - acoustic guitar, electric guitar, piano, harmonica, vocals
- David Bromberg - dobro, acoustic guitar
- Andy Johnson - electric guitar, acoustic guitar, vibraphone, background vocals
- David Briggs - organ, keyboards, celeste
- Weldon Myrick - steel guitar
- Norbert Putnam - bass
- Glen Spreen - organ, harpsichord, keyboards, woodwinds
- Eddie Hinton - acoustic guitar, electric guitar
- Grady Martin - gut string guitar, acoustic guitar
- Kevin Kelly - accordion
- Mark Sporer - bass
- Kenneth Buttrey - drums, percussion, tambourine
- Jim McKevitt - drums
- Rick Shlosser - drums
- Deborah Andersen - piano, background vocals
- Joni Mitchell - vocals, background vocals
- Farrell Morris - vibraphone, background vocals
- Jerry Carrigan - percussion
- Millie Kirkham - background vocals
- Sonja Montgomery - background vocals
- Laverna Moore - background vocals
- Florence Warner - background vocals
- Temple Riser - background vocals
- The Jordanaires - background vocals
- The Holidays - background vocals

== Production ==
- Producer: Norbert Putnam
- Recording Engineer: Stan Hutto/Glen Kolotkin/Stan Tonkel
- Production Manager: Jessica Sowin
- Art Direction: John Berg
- Liner Notes: Anthony DeCurtis
- Photography: Urve Kuusik/Sandy Speiser/Don Nelson
