= Seymour Solomon =

Seymour Solomon (May 23, 1922 – July 18, 2002) was an American music business executive who co-founded Vanguard Records in 1950, with his younger brother Maynard Solomon.

== Life and career ==
He was born in Manhattan, New York, and studied violin at the Juilliard School. He joined the United States Army Air Forces Orchestra in World War II, and played for US troops in the Far East. After his return he studied musicology at New York University before working as a critic for music magazines, and on radio stations.

In 1950 he traveled to Europe with a tape recorder, and recorded five Bach cantatas performed by the Vienna Philharmonic and Vienna State Opera. On his return, he released the recordings on the Bach Guild label that he set up for the purpose. Later in the year, with the help of a loan from his father and the involvement of his younger brother Maynard, he formed the Vanguard Recording Society, into which the Bach Guild was subsumed. The company took full advantage of the new technology of long-playing records, allowing it to release longer unbroken classical music performances than was previously possible.

Although initially recording an eclectic range of classical music, as the label developed through the 1950s and 1960s its roster expanded to include jazz, folk, and blues musicians, including The Weavers, Joan Baez, Odetta, Larry Coryell, Mississippi John Hurt, Charlie Musselwhite, and Buddy Guy.

Seymour and Maynard Solomon sold Vanguard in 1986 to the Welk Music Group. In 1988, Seymour Solomon started a new company, Omega Classics, and later bought back Vanguard's classical catalog from Welk, reissuing it on CD on the Omega and Vanguard Classics labels.

He died in 2002 at his summer home in Lenox, Massachusetts, at the age of 80.
