= Jules Halfant =

American painter

- Born: June 23, 1909; New York City, New York, U.S.
- Died: May 5, 2001 (aged 91); Berkeley Heights, New Jersey, U.S.
- Education: National Academy of Design, New York
- Known for: Painter, printmaker, art director and designer

Jules Halfant (June 23, 1909 in New York City, New York – May 5, 2001 in Berkeley Heights, New Jersey) was an American painter and printmaker. He is notable as a Federal Art Project (FAP) artist during the Great Depression of the 1930s in both mural and easel categories of the New York Works Progress Administration (WPA). While in the WPA, he worked alongside such well-known artists as Jackson Pollock, Mark Rothko, Milton Avery and Stuart Davis. From 1953 to 1988 Jules Halfant was Art Director of Vanguard Records where he designed albums featuring Joan Baez, Tom Paxton, Country Joe and the Fish, Buffy Sainte-Marie, Buddy Guy, Junior Wells, Richard and Mimi Farnia, and many other musicians.

While attending high school in Brooklyn, New York with Jacob Kainen, Jules submitted his drawings to the National Academy of Design in New York at age of fourteen. He was accepted as a student and studied there in 1924–1927. During the 1930s and 1940s, Jules Halfant created hundreds of paintings depicting street scenes of New York City. He provided the illustrations for Jazz, A People's Music, a 1948 study by Marxist art critic Sidney Finkelstein. He did many record covers for EMS Recordings.

Halfant painted his neighbors, parents, friends, shopkeepers, pushcart vendors. Beginning in the 1950s, the artist started to focus on painting Jewish religious and cultural life. He got inspiration from works of great Jewish authors (Dybbuk by S. Ansky, Tevye by Sholem Aleichem, Three Wishes by I. L. Peretz), Biblical stories as well from visiting synagogues where he depicted different aspects of the services and holidays observances. In 1963, Jules Halfant designed the Bob Dylan New York City Town Hall Concert poster.

Collections

- Brooklyn Museum, New York City, New York
- Smithsonian American Art Museum, Washington, D.C.
- Wolfsonian–Florida International University, Miami Beach, Florida, The Mitchell Wolfson Jr. Collection

Discography (Visual)

- Joan Baez – Joan Baez ◄ (5 versions) Vanguard 1960
- Doc Watson – Doc Watson Vanguard 1964
- John Hammond – Big City Blues (LP, Album, Mono) Vanguard 1964
- Joan Baez – Farewell, Angelina ◄ (4 versions) Vanguard 1965
- Buffy Sainte-Marie – Little Wheel Spin and Spin ◄ (4 versions) Vanguard 1966
- Perrey – Kingsley* – The In Sound from Way Out! ◄ (3 versions) Vanguard 1966
- The Serpent Power – The Serpent Power Vanguard 1967
- Doc Watson – Home Again! ◄ (2 versions) Fontana 1967
- The Siegel-Schwall Band – Say Siegel-Schwall ◄ (2 versions) Vanguard 1967
- Mississippi John Hurt – The Immortal Mississippi John Hurt ◄ (3 versions) Vanguard 1967
- Circus Maximus – Circus Maximus Vanguard 1967
- Charley Musselwhite – Stand Back! Here Comes Charley Musselwhite's South Side Band Vanguard 1967
- Country Joe and the Fish – Electric Music for the Mind and Body ◄ (3 versions) Vanguard 1967
- Listening – Listening ◄ (2 versions) Vanguard 1968
- Elizabeth – Elizabeth Vanguard 1968
- Joan Baez – Baptism Vanguard 1968
- Peter Walker – "Second Poem To Karmela" Or Gypsies Are Important (LP) Vanguard 1968
- Rev. Gary Davis – The Reverend Gary Davis at Newport (LP) Vanguard 1968
- Circus Maximus – Neverland Revisited (LP, Album) Vanguard 1968
- Junior Wells – Coming At You (LP, Album) Vanguard 1968
- Joan Baez – David's Album Vanguard 1969
- Country Joe & the Fish – Greatest Hits Vanguard 1969
- Joan Baez – Joan Baez Vol. 2 ◄ (3 versions) Vanguard 1969
- Ferre Grignard – Captain Disaster Major Minor, Barclay 1970
- Wildweeds – Wildweeds (LP, Album) Vanguard 1970
- Buffy Sainte-Marie – She Used to Wanna Be a Ballerina ◄ (2 versions) Vanguard 1971
- Country Joe and the Fish – The Life and Times of Country Joe and the Fish from Haight-Ashbury to Woodstock ◄ (3 versions) Vanguard 1971
- Zager & Evans – Food for the Mind (LP, Album) Vanguard 1971
- Mimi & Richard Fariña – The Best of Mimi & Richard Fariña (2xLP, Comp) Vanguard 1971
- Al Anderson – Al Anderson (LP, Album) Vanguard 1972
- Mississippi John Hurt – Last Sessions ◄ (2 versions) Vanguard 1972
- Oregon – Music of Another Present Era ◄ (3 versions) Vanguard 1972
- Larry Coryell – Offering ◄ (4 versions) Vanguard, Vanguard 1972
- Various – The Greatest Songs of Woody Guthrie ◄ (2 versions) Vanguard 1972
- Buffy Sainte-Marie – Moonshot ◄ (8 versions) Vanguard 1972
- Various – Greatest Folksingers of the Sixties Vanguard 1972
- Buffy Sainte-Marie – Quiet Places ◄ (4 versions) Vanguard 1973
- Country Joe McDonald – Paris Sessions Vanguard, Vanguard 1973
- Sivuca – Sivuca ◄ (2 versions) Vanguard 1973
- Larry Coryell – The Real Great Escape ◄ (2 versions) Vanguard 1973
- P.D.Q. Bach – The Intimate P.D.Q. Bach (LP, Gat) Vanguard, Vanguard 1973
- Larry Coryell – Planet End Vanguard 1975
- Big Mama Thornton – Sassy Mama! ◄ (2 versions) Vanguard 1975
- Larry Coryell – The Restful Mind ◄ (2 versions) Vanguard 1975
- Sivuca – Live at the Village Gate (LP) Vanguard 1975
- The Pazant Bros. & the Beaufort Express – Loose and Juicy (LP, Album) Vanguard, Vanguard 1975
- Camille Yarbrough – The Iron Pot Cooker (LP, Album) Vanguard 1975
- Joan Baez – The Joan Baez Lovesong Album (2xLP, Comp, Gat) Vanguard 1976
- The Players' Association – The Players' Association Vanguard 1977
- Elvin Jones, James Moody, Clark Terry, Bunky Green, Roland Prince – Summit Meeting ◄ (3 versions) Vanguard 1977
- The Players Association – Born to Dance ◄ (2 versions) Vanguard 1977
- The Players Association – Turn The Music Up! Vanguard, Vanguard 1979
- The Players Association – We Got the Groove! Vanguard, Vanguard 1980
- Roni Griffith – Roni Griffith ◄ (2 versions) Vanguard 1982
- Roni Griffith – (The Best Part of) Breakin' Up / Desire Vanguard 1982
- P.D.Q. Bach – A Little Nightmare Music ◄ (2 versions) Vanguard 1983
- Bert Jansch with John Renbourn – Jack Orion Vanguard 1991
- Eric Andersen – Bout Changes & Things Vanguard 1993
- Carl Oglesby – Carl Oglesby / Going to Damascus (CD, Comp) Universe (3), Vanguard 2003
- Doc Watson – Southbound Cisco Music 2005
- John Hammond – So Many Roads Vanguard 2011
- Eric Andersen – More Hits from Tin Can Alley Vanguard, Comet Records (2) Year unknown
- Baldwin and Leps – Baldwin and Leps Vanguard, Comet Records (2) Year unknown
- Oregon – Friends ◄ (2 versions) Vanguard Year unknown
- Joan Baez – In Concert (2xLP) Vanguard Year unknown
