= Debbie Green =

American folk singer (born 1940)

Deborah T Green (June 28, 1940 – December 9, 2017) was an American folk singer, who had an early influence on Joan Baez, Eric Andersen, Eric Clapton and others in the 1960s. She was one of the first folk performers at the Club 47 Mount Auburn in Cambridge, Massachusetts before moving to Berkeley, California in 1960.

== Early life and education ==
Debbie Green was born on June 28, 1940 in New York City as the youngest of three children of Mary Thurston (Tibbits), a teacher and daughter of a grocery wholesale owner from St. Louis, and Thomas Marshall Green (1905 – 1984), a lawyer with Breed, Abbott & Morgan in Manhattan. Her paternal grandfather, William O. B. Green (1868 – 1909) was a civil engineer and construction supervisor on the Pan American Railroad project in Mexico, where he lived for several decades around the turn of the century. Through him, she is a direct descendant of Thomas Marshall.

She grew up in an upscale neighborhood of Staten Island. Her parents separated when Debbie was four; she and her brothers stayed with her mother. She later attended The Putney School, where she was first exposed to music. In 1958, she matriculated at Boston University.

== Career background ==
Green played the ukulele, guitar, electric bass and piano. (Bob Dylan allegedly described her as “a great piano player”.)

While a freshman at Boston University, Green taught Joan Baez guitar and Baez has noted her influence as a teacher. Other observers claim that Baez was a Green imitator and turned Green into an apparent Baez imitator. Eric Andersen has said that Green taught both him and Eric Clapton fingerpicking. Allegedly too pretty to be taken seriously, and with her style adopted by others, Green never recorded an album under her own name. She recorded only one song during her heyday, "Who's Going to Be My Man". Motherhood and pulmonary health problems put her singing career on hold.

== Personal life ==
She married folk musician Eric Andersen in 1967, with whom she had a daughter, Sarah G. "Sari" Andersen Bouret, in 1970.

Eric Andersen announced on his Facebook page that she died December 9, 2017.
