= Vanguard Records =

American record label

- Parent company: Concord (2015-2026); BMG Rights Management (2026-present)
- Founded: 1950
- Founder: Maynard Solomon; Seymour Solomon
- Distributors: Universal Music Group; Craft Recordings
- Genre: Classical music, folk, rock, jazz
- Country of origin: U.S.
- Official website: concord.com/labels/vanguard-records/

Vanguard Recording Society or simply Vanguard is an American record label set up in 1950 by brothers Maynard and Seymour Solomon in New York City. It was primarily a classical label during its peak in the 1950s and 1960s, but also has a catalogue of recordings by a number of pivotal jazz, folk, and blues musicians. The Bach Guild was a subsidiary label.

The label was acquired by Concord Bicycle Music in April 2015.

== History ==
The newly founded venture's first record was of J.S. Bach's 21st cantata, Ich hatte viel Bekümmernis, BWV 21 ("I had much grief"), with Jonathan Sternberg conducting the tenor Hugues Cuénod and other soloists, chorus and orchestra. "What speaks for the Solomons' steadfastness in their taste and their task", wrote a Billboard journalist in November 1966, "is that this record is still alive in the catalogue (SC-501). As Seymour says, it was a good performance, not easy to top. Of the whole Vanguard/Bach Guild catalogue, numbering about 480 issues, 30 are Bach records..." The label also recorded other baroque and earlier works, pieces from the English Madrigal School performed by the Deller Consort, Italian and French madrigal masterpieces, Elizabethan and Jacobean music, and Henry Purcell.

In 1951, Vanguard's Art Director Jules Halfant hired Marxist music critic Sidney Finkelstein on the staff of the record label, where the latter worked until 1973, mostly writing liner notes on classical LPs. In the mid-1950s, Vanguard signed blacklisted performers Paul Robeson and the Weavers. It continued to issue folk music with newly signed artists Joan Baez, Hedy West, Eric Andersen, the Rooftop Singers, Buffy Sainte-Marie, Ian and Sylvia, and Mimi and Richard Fariña. Around this time, the company briefly ran a hi-fi division titled Vanguard Stereolab; the English band Stereolab took their name from it.

In 1953, under the direction of John Hammond, Vanguard began the Jazz Showcase series that concentrated on mainstream jazz, producing about two dozen recordings before it was closed in 1958. Recordings made at the Spirituals to Swing concerts in 1938 and 1939 were released by Vanguard in 1959. The company only intermittently pursued recording jazz after that.

In the summer of 1965, Maynard Solomon hired Samuel Charters to edit the tapes of the 1964 Newport Folk Festival. Following that project, the company sent Charters to Chicago to capture the broad range of blues musicians there. Those sessions resulted in the 1966 three-album series titled Chicago/The Blues/Today!. The albums included Junior Wells with Buddy Guy, Otis Rush, Homesick James, Johnny Shines, Big Walter Horton, Charlie Musselwhite and Muddy Waters's bandmates Otis Spann and James Cotton.

Vanguard released numerous classical recordings, both domestically produced and imported. Many of the latter came from the United Kingdom's Pye Records label, featuring performances by the Halle Orchestra conducted by Sir John Barbirolli. The recordings were so exceptional that many classical radio stations programmed them.

The label also released many performances by the Utah Symphony Orchestra conducted by Maurice Abravanel, including one of the first sets of the complete ten symphonies of Gustav Mahler, a complete performance of The Nutcracker, as well as the earlier P.D.Q. Bach recordings, from 1965 to 1983. Vanguard was the first American label to release the complete 1944 high fidelity recordings of composer Richard Strauss conducting the Vienna Philharmonic Orchestra in most of his tone poems; the recordings were made on the Magnetophon tape recording equipment in the Vienna Opera House.

The multiplicity of popular in-house classical music series released by the Solomons on Vanguard and Bach Guild between 1950 and 1966 included, in addition to 22 Bach cantatas, the virtuoso trumpet, virtuoso flute and virtuoso oboe, along with German University Songs with Erich Kunz, songs of the Auvergne, Viennese dances with Willi Boskovsky, traditional songs by Roland Hayes, Vivaldi's Four Seasons and other concertos from I Solisti di Zagreb, music by Ralph Vaughan Williams, numerous Haydn symphonies performed by the Esterhazy Orchestra, a double LP of Gluck's opera Orfeo ed Euridice sung in Italian with the Vienna State Opera Orchestra led by Charles Mackerras, and an influential Mahler cycle with the Utah Symphony Orchestra conducted by Maurice Abravanel.

Vanguard entered the Rock music market with the debut LP by Country Joe and the Fish in 1967. The label a 6500 series for releases by rock acts but had little success. By the early 1970s, with acts such as Joan Baez and Ian & Sylvia leaving for other labels, and disappointing sales for the "Everyman" budget classical series, Vanguard's stature in the music industry was diminished. The label stayed minimally active with specialty releases such as those by Indian classical musician and sarod virtuoso Vasant Rai. An unexpected novelty hit on Vanguard, "Shaving Cream" by Benny Bell, led the company to release albums of humorous music inspired by Dr. Demento. In the late 1970s Tom Paxton issued two albums, New Songs from the Briar-patch and Heroes, on the label. A few disco albums by acts such as Players Association, Alphone Mouzon's "Poussez", and Marcus Barone's "The Ring/Savage Lover" were released on Vanguard with both domestic and worldwide chart impact.

After this period of near-dormancy, Vanguard was sold to the Welk Music Group in 1985. The Welk Group sold the classical music catalog back to Seymour Solomon. Welk Music Group revitalized the label, reissuing much of its extensive folk and popular music back catalogue (a good deal of which had been out of print for several years) on CD, as well as signing a number of new artists (such as Matt Nathanson, Mindy Smith, Greg Laswell, and Trevor Hall), in addition to established musicians such as Merle Haggard, John Fogerty, Chris Isaak, Robert Cray, Shawn Mullins, and Linda Ronstadt. The label also formed marketing partnerships with a number of artist-run label imprints, to include Levon Helm (Dirt Farmer Music), Indigo Girls (IG Recording), and Chely Wright (Painted Red Music), among others. This era for Vanguard also garnered the label three consecutive Grammy Awards for Levon Helm, multiple Grammy Awards for Robert Cray, and an RIAA certified platinum single for Matt Nathanson's "Come on Get Higher." In 2008, Welk Music Group began a distribution deal with EMI to handle its labels, including Vanguard.

After Seymour Solomon's death, Vanguard Classics was sold to Artemis Records, which reactivated the company with new releases by Leon Fleisher and Gil Shaham. When Artemis folded in 2004, the Vanguard Classics catalogue was sold to Sheridan Square Entertainment, which is licensing the Vanguard Classics material. Sheridan Square eventually became IndieBlu, which was acquired by Entertainment One in 2010. Vanguard Music Group was acquired by Concord Bicycle Music in April 2015., BMG/Concord's Craft Recordings unit manages the Vanguard catalog.

Vanguard used the Brooklyn Masonic Temple in New York City as one of its recording studios for many of its sessions.

== Quadraphonic recording ==
Vanguard was a innovator in bringing 4-channel quadraphonic sound to the home listener. In 1969 Vanguard released a series of prerecorded tapes on the Q4 open reel tape format, making it the first company to do so. Specialized machines to play these tapes were introduced by electronics manufacturers such as TEAC Corporation at about the same time. Early 4-channel releases were marketed by Vanguard as "Surround Stereo". Beginning in 1971 Vanguard released many LP quad recordings of both popular and classical music, including a performance of Tchaikovsky's Fourth Symphony with the American Symphony Orchestra conducted by Leopold Stokowski. This LP release was encoded in the SQ matrix system developed by CBS, but the label also released quad LPs encoded in the QS Regular Matrix system, developed by Sansui. Quad formats were not widely adopted and Vanguard discontinued these releases by the mid 1970s.

== Retrospective compilations ==
In 2012, Ace Records released a 4 x CD box set with accompanying book on their 'Ace Vanguard Masters' imprint label titled 'Make It Your Sound, Make It Your Scene: Vanguard Records & The 1960s Musical Revolution' (VANBOX 14). Written and compiled by John Crosby, and designed by Alex Smee.

== Roster ==
=== Classical artists (1950-1966) ===
- Maurice Abravanel
- Julius Baker
- Alfred Brendel
- Adrian Boult
- John Barbirolli
- Willi Boskovsky
- Jeanne-Marie Darre
- Netania Davrath
- Alfred Deller
- Mischa Elman
- Maureen Forrester
- Vladimir Golschmann
- Anton Heiller
- Antonio Janigro
- Charles Mackerras
- Jan Peerce
- Felix Prohaska
- Alexander Schneider
- Peter Serkin
- Leopold Stokowski
- Joseph Szigeti

=== Current artists ===
- Barenaked Ladies
- Blue Giant
- Bruce Hornsby
- Chely Wright
- Chris Isaak
- Clairy Browne & The Bangin' Rackettes
- Collective Soul
- Diane Schuur
- The Gourds
- Greg Laswell
- Indigo Girls
- Isobel Campbell
- Lee DeWyze
- The Living Sisters
- Marc Broussard
- Matt Nathanson
- O.A.R.
- Ozomatli
- Parachute
- Robert Francis
- Rodney Crowell
- Shawn Mullins
- Stephen Kellogg & The Sixers
- Susanna Hoffs
- Trevor Hall
- Viva Voce

=== Former artists ===
(Partial list)

- Pat Martino
- Alisha
- Andrew McMahon in the Wilderness
- The Alternate Routes
- Eric Andersen
- Joan Baez
- BeauSoleil
- Blues Traveler
- Robert Bradley
- Alison Brown
- Sandy Bull
- Kimberly Caldwell
- Camper Van Beethoven
- Carbon Leaf
- Peter Case
- Don Williams
- Deana Carter
- Liam Clancy
- The Clancy Brothers
- Buck Clayton
- Larry Coryell
- James Cotton
- Joe Grushecky
- The Country Gentlemen
- Country Joe & the Fish
- Robert Cray
- Pee Wee Crayton
- Catie Curtis
- Erik Darling
- Vic Dickenson
- The Dillards
- Ramblin' Jack Elliott
- John Fahey
- Richard Fariña & Mimi Fariña
- Flashman
- Flogging Molly
- John Fogerty
- Julia Fordham
- Bob Frank
- Kinky Friedman
- The Frost
- Steve Gillette
- Buddy Guy
- Merle Haggard
- John Hammond
- Levon Helm
- John Hiatt
- Big Walter Horton
- Cisco Houston
- Jesca Hoop
- Mississippi John Hurt
- J. B. Hutto
- Ian & Sylvia
- Indigenous
- Skip James
- Bert Jansch
- David Earle Johnson
- Joey + Rory
- Klezmer Conservatory Band
- Patty Larkin
- Live
- Dave Mallett
- Edwin McCain
- John McEuen
- Max Morath
- Nellie McKay
- Ramsay Midwood
- Charlie Musselwhite
- Phil Ochs
- Sinéad O'Connor
- Odetta
- Oregon
- Joan Osborne
- Tom Paxton
- Jan Peerce
- Perrey & Kingsley
- Gershon Kingsley
- Jean-Jacques Perrey
- Jim Kweskin
- Kim Richey
- Paul Robeson
- Linda Ronstadt
- The Rooftop Singers
- Otis Rush
- Jimmy Rushing
- Buffy Sainte-Marie
- Peter Schickele
- Mark Selby
- Shurman
- Mindy Smith
- Siegel-Schwall Band
- Patrick Sky
- Otis Spann
- Garrison Starr
- Big Mama Thornton
- Switchfoot
- Twilight 22
- The Vagrants
- Jerry Jeff Walker
- Peter Walker
- The Watson Twins
- Doc Watson
- The Weavers
- Junior Wells
- Hedy West
- David Wilcox
- Mason Williams
- Daphne Willis
- Yonder Mountain String Band
- The Young Tradition
- Zager and Evans

== See also ==
- List of record labels
- Welk Music Group
- Ranwood Records
- Sugar Hill Records (bluegrass label)
