= The Best of The Waterboys 81–90 =

Best of The Waterboys 81–90

Greatest hits album by The Waterboys
- Released: April 1991
- Recorded: May 1982 – February 1990
- Genre: Rock
- Length: 53:12
- Label: Chrysalis

The Waterboys chronology
Room to Roam (1990)	Best of The Waterboys 81–90 (1991)	Dream Harder (1993)

Professional ratings
Review scores
Source	Rating
AllMusic	4.5/5 stars
NME	7/10
Select	4/5 stars
Smash Hits	6/10 stars

The Best of The Waterboys 81–90 is a compilation album by The Waterboys, released on 29 April 1991.

== Background ==
The Best of The Waterboys 81–90 is made up of 12 tracks which were personally selected by the band's lead singer, musician and songwriter Mike Scott. The album, along with a re-issue of the single "The Whole of the Moon", was an attempt by Chrysalis Records to boost the band's record sales to match their reputation. A survey of album buyers carried out by the label found that 11% considered themselves fans of the Waterboys and only 1% actually owned any of their singles or albums. The re-release of "The Whole of the Moon" preceded the album and reached No. 3 in the UK Singles Chart. From 22 April, a week before the compilation's release, Chrysalis launched a £100,000 marketing campaign which included press advertising and in-store displays, and this was followed by a £150,000 TV advertising campaign.

Jason Guy, the head of marketing at Chrysalis, told Music Week in 1991, "The band have a great reputation and they've released five albums, but people don't know where to start. This compilation solves that problem." The compilation's booklet was provided with images of the band's studio albums along with their track listings to encourage buyers to seek out the band's back catalogue based on the tracks they liked on the compilation. The album was released on 29 April and reached No. 2 in the UK Albums Chart. It was also a success in Europe, reaching No. 11 on the European Top 100 Albums chart.

Speaking of the compilation to Melody Maker in 1991, Scott stated,

"This compilation was a very un-Waterboys thing to do, but I didn't have any choice. They had the right by contract, some loophole in the contract. I couldn't stop them, so I thought I would get involved. I compiled the album myself. God only knows what it would have been like if they'd compiled it! It was difficult to compress it into one album. I left out an awful lot of songs I really love: 'The Pan Within', 'December', 'Savage Earth Heart', 'A Pagan Place', 'Rags', 'The Stolen Child'. There just wasn't room for them."

== Critical reception ==
Upon its release, Ian Gittins of Melody Maker described the compilation as "unreservedly recommended" and a "splendid document, a treasure trove which tacitly acknowledges that Mike Scott's aesthetic fortunes have taken a recent dip". He favoured the material from the Waterboys' earlier "Big Music" period, commenting, "Few bands have soared like the Waterboys. So very few have found it in them to make music gripped by such a huge, hurting sense of ambition, so devout a quest for the stars, so passionate a bid to transcend history and genre via mighty spirit. Few have seen so much of the moon. And few star-seekers, it must sadly be said, have plunged back to the mud of terra firma with such a sickening thud. The Waterboys had it all."

== Track listing ==
All tracks are written by Mike Scott, except where noted.

No.	Title	Writer(s)	Length
1.	"A Girl Called Johnny"		3:54
2.	"The Big Music"		4:40
3.	"All the Things She Gave Me"		4:31
4.	"The Whole of the Moon"		5:00
5.	"Spirit"		1:51
6.	"Don't Bang the Drum"	Scott, Karl Wallinger	6:44
7.	"Fisherman's Blues"	Scott, Steve Wickham	4:23
8.	"Killing My Heart"		3:37
9.	"Strange Boat"	Scott, Anthony Thistlethwaite	3:08
10.	"And a Bang on the Ear"		7:25
11.	"Old England" (Recorded live at Barrowlands, Glasgow, March 1989)		4:13
12.	"A Man Is in Love" (incl. "Kaliope House")		3:50

== Charts ==
Chart (1991)	Peak position
Australian Albums (ARIA Charts)	101
Dutch Albums (Album Top 100)	69
European Top 100 Albums	11
German Albums (Offizielle Top 100)	52
New Zealand Albums (RMNZ)	32
Norwegian Albums (VG-lista)	17
Swedish Albums (Sverigetopplistan)	19
UK Albums (OCC)	2

Chart (2012)	Peak position
Irish Albums Chart	63
