= This Is the Sea =

- Cover art by Lynn Goldsmith

Studio album by the Waterboys
- Released: 16 September 1985
- Recorded: February – August 1985
- Studios: Park Gates in Hastings; Livingstone, Seaview, the Chocolate Factory, RG Jones, Townhouse, and Good Earth in London
- Genres: Alternative rock; post-punk; art rock; folk rock
- Length: 42:08
- Labels: Ensign; Island; Chrysalis
- Producers: Mike Scott; John Brand; Mick Glossop; Karl Wallinger

The Waterboys chronology
A Pagan Place (1984)	This Is the Sea (1985)	Fisherman's Blues (1988)

Singles from This Is the Sea
- 1. "The Whole of the Moon" Released: 14 October 1985; 2. "Don't Bang the Drum" Released: December 1985; 3. "Medicine Bow" Released: April 1986

This Is the Sea is the third studio album by the Waterboys, released on 16 September 1985 by Ensign Records. The last of their "Big Music" albums, it is considered by critics to be the finest album of the Waterboys' early rock-oriented sound, described as "epic" and "a defining moment". It peaked at number 37 in the UK Albums Chart. Steve Wickham makes his Waterboys recording debut playing violin on "The Pan Within" and subsequently joined the band. This Is the Sea is the last Waterboys album with contributions from Karl Wallinger, who left the group to form his own band, World Party.

The album was recorded between March and July 1985, and released that October. Mike Scott, the album's principal songwriter and leader of the Waterboys, describes This Is the Sea as "the record on which I achieved all my youthful musical ambitions", "the final, fully realised expression of the early Waterboys sound", influenced by The Velvet Underground, Van Morrison's Astral Weeks, and Steve Reich.

This Is the Sea contains the best-selling Waterboys single, "The Whole of the Moon". The album cover is a photograph taken by Lynn Goldsmith.

A remastered and expanded version was released in 2004. A complete box set of studio recording sessions, demos and live recordings was released as 1985 in 2024, documenting the making of This Is the Sea.

== Production history ==
Scott began writing songs for This Is the Sea in the spring of 1984, beginning with the song "Trumpets". Scott recalls that in December 1984 "during the Waterboys' first American tour, [he] bought two huge hard-bound books... in which to assemble [his] new songs" For the following two months Scott worked on the songs in his apartment, writing the lyrics, and working on guitar and piano arrangements. Scott wrote between 35 and 40 songs, but felt that the nine songs that made it onto the album "were the ones that were intended to be there". The first song from the album to be played live was "Trumpets", on 10 April 1984.

The first recording session for This Is the Sea began in March 1985 at Park Gates Studio in Hastings, England with engineer and producer John Brand. Band members Scott, Anthony Thistlethwaite, Karl Wallinger, Chris Whitten, and Roddy Lorimer performed the new material. Wallinger's home studio heard demo recordings for a number of the album's songs. Some of the recordings, like the ones of the last two albums, are relatively untouched by studio engineering. On other recordings, however, Scott added a drum machine and layered the sound, using a studio technique similar to that of the famous record producer Phil Spector, with help from Wallinger. "Having Karl [Wallinger] in the studio", writes Scott, "was like having a one-man orchestra around. There might have been a This Is the Sea without him, but it wouldn't have been the same – or as good".

The recording sessions continued through June. By July, Wickham, after an invitation from Scott, entered the studio with the band to add his fiddle to "The Pan Within". Produced from the original sessions at Park Gates Studio, along with recordings from Livingston Studios in London, Amazon in Liverpool, Seaview, and The Townhouse Studio, among others, the album was released in October. Peter Anderson, writing in Record Collector, describes Scott as "completely at home in the studio" and writes that Scott "spared nothing on" This Is the Sea.

A remastered version was released in 2004, with a second CD of material from the album's singles, and unreleased tracks from the This Is the Sea recording sessions.

== Album promotion ==
This Is the Sea was promoted heavily and reached number 37 in the UK Albums Chart. Neither of the two preceding albums had charted in the Top 40.

The album was followed by tours in the United Kingdom, and in North America as the headliners. Sinéad O'Connor made her UK live debut as a backing singer on "The Big Music" at a concert at the London Town and Country Club. In December, the Waterboys joined the band Simple Minds for a European tour. During the three major tours, the band's lineup began to change, and the album received more exposure than its two predecessors. Mike Scott, however, in a decision that expressed the values he had written about when authoring punk rock fanzines, refused to promote the album and the single "The Whole of the Moon" on Top of the Pops because he would not lip sync, a requirement on the show at that time.

=== Music video ===
Meiert Avis directed the video for "The Whole of the Moon", using visionary lighting elements based on Mark Helprin's Winter's Tale and his memories of a 1962 theatrical production of Charles Kingsley's The Water Babies. Avis addressed Scott's aversion to lip syncing, by shooting the visuals for "The Whole of the Moon" while capturing a unique live audio performance of the single. Avis later used this technique on several videos with Bruce Springsteen, who shares Scott's aversion.

== Song details ==
Themes of the album include spirituality ("Spirit", "The Pan Within"), romantic love ("Trumpets"), and English politics ("Old England"), while the album's eponymous single ("This Is The Sea") utilizes the allusion of the flowing river as a life affirming recognition of constant renewal and regeneration. Michael Tucker, in an article entitled "The Body Electric: The Shamanic Spirit in Twentieth Century Music", lists This Is the Sea as an example of shamanistic themes in twentieth-century Western music. Irish musician Bono includes the album on his "top ten" list, noting "In rock, the word 'poet' gets thrown around a lot. Not here..."

"Don't Bang the Drum", the lyrics of which encourage environmentalism, was released as a single in Germany, with a song titled "Ways of Men" as the B-side. The first draft of the song's music was written by Wallinger. Scott reworked the arrangement, changing its rhythm and "feel", but Wallinger's melody and chords were preserved.

Cover of the award-winning single for "The Whole of the Moon".

"The Whole of the Moon", one of the Waterboys' best-known songs and their most commercially successful, was first released as a twelve-inch single, and reached number twenty-eight on the UK Singles Chart. The single also contained a live recording of "The Girl in the Swing", from The Waterboys, the band's debut album, an extended mix of "Spirit", and a song titled "Medicine Jack". The latter two appear on the second disc of the album's re-release. When the single was reissued in 1990, it reached number 3, and was awarded the Ivor Novello Award in 1991. Including the 2004 remastered album, the song has been officially released four times.

The song began as a "scribble on the back of an envelope on a wintry New York street", after Scott's girlfriend asked him if it was difficult to write a song, and was unfinished at the beginning of the recording sessions, eventually being completed in May 1985. The song, like the Waterboys' first single "A Girl Called Johnny" is a tribute to an inspirational figure. In each line, the singer describes his own perspective and immediately contrasts it with that of the song's subject, summarizing the difference with the line "I saw the crescent / You saw the whole of the moon". "You saw Brigadoon", one of these contrasts, refers to a fictional village that exists only one day every century (from the musical of the same name).

The subject of the song has inspired some speculation. Musician Nikki Sudden, with whom Scott had collaborated before forming the Waterboys, said that Scott told Max Edie, the backing singer for "The Whole of the Moon", that the song was written about Sudden. AllMusic instead suggests that its subject is actually a number of people who inspired Scott, including Christian writer C. S. Lewis and the musician Prince. Scott himself says that he "couldn't have written" the song without having read Mark Helprin's novel Winter's Tale, but goes on to state that the song is not about Helprin (a different song inspired by and named after the Winter's Tale character Beverly Penn was recorded during the album sessions, and appeared on the 2004 reissue). The official Waterboys website's Frequently Asked Questions clarifies that Scott has said that the song's subject is "a composite of many people", including C. S. Lewis, but explicitly states that it is not about Prince.

A feature of "The Whole of the Moon" is the trumpet work on the recording, courtesy of the classically trained Lorimer, who spent three days with Scott working on the song's arrangement. According to Lorimer, he "went home with a tape of the song and thought about a more classical approach. After a while sitting at the piano I came up with the idea of antiphonal trumpets. A piccolo trumpet on the left answered a piccolo on the right and then the same again, growing by adding a Bb trumpet below each side of the stereo picture. Mike [Scott] loved it, except the slightly jazzy chords I had used on the run down at the very end, which he simplified. I used the same classical approach later in the song, mixing two classical-type trumpets behind a later verse." Lorimer also contributes falsetto background vocals to the song, while Thistlethwaite, another brass section member, performs a saxophone solo near the end.

The Whole of the Moon
The album version of "The Whole of the Moon" demonstrates Lorimer's contribution.

The popularity of "The Whole of the Moon" has created a market for unlicensed copies, such as the above compact disc.

"The Whole of the Moon" was covered by Jennifer Warnes on her 1992 album The Hunter, by Mandy Moore on her 2003 album Coverage, by the band Human Drama on the compilation album New Wave Goes to Hell and by folk singer-songwriter Peter Mulvey on his 1995 release Rapture. It has also appeared on numerous other compilations.

"Spirit", a song praising the resilience of the human spirit, originally appeared on a short, one-and-a-half minute version. A full four-minute version of the song was released on the 2004 remastered disc.

The lyrics of "The Pan Within" are partly derived from meditation techniques ("Close your eyes / Breathe slow / And we'll begin"). It was the first of two Waterboys songs about the Ancient Greek god Pan, which have been played as a medley at Waterboys concerts. Scott describes the song's guitar solo as "[consisting] of a series of phrases or lines/melodies that generally build in an order (which may change), though which includes a lot of improvisation which is different each night. The lines have never been 'tabbed' or written down... The song is in the key of A-minor (the chords under the solo are F – Em – Am – Am repeated)". The second Pan song, "The Return of Pan", appears on the album Dream Harder. "The Pan Within" is the first Waterboys song to feature Wickham's fiddle playing. It was selected as one of DWXB-FM's Hits of 1986. In Southeast Asia, particularly in the Philippines, when the New Wave era started in 1985, the group's biggest hit single is "The Pan Within", aside from "The Whole of the Moon" and "Don't Bang the Drum".

An alternative version of "Medicine Bow" was released as a single in Germany, with an instrumental version of "Don't Bang the Drum" for the 7-inch. The 12-inch contained another mix of "Medicine Bow" and "Ways of Men". Scott writes that he invented the name, and was unaware of Medicine Bow, Wyoming. The album's re-release contains a "full length" version of the song that contains an instrumental "piano storm – from first sonic droplets of rain to final crashing thunder and lightning" performed by Adrian Johnston.

"Old England" is a criticism of Thatcherism, blaming Margaret Thatcher's economic policies for what Scott perceived to be an increase in desperation amongst the young and poor in the England of that time, and a rise in drug addiction, specifically to heroin. The refrain, "Old England is dying" is a quote from James Joyce, and the lines "You're asking what makes me sigh now / What it is makes me shudder so" are from W. B. Yeats' poem, "Mad as the Mist and Snow". The Clash, one of the bands that had inspired Scott during his punk music phase, released "This Is England", a song with a similar theme, as a single the same year. Scott and the Waterboys would move to Ireland the following year.

"Be My Enemy" is an uptempo track, heavily influenced by Bob Dylan's "Tombstone Blues" and "Bob Dylan's 115th Dream".

"Trumpets", a love song, was the first song written for the album, in the spring of 1984, and the first song from the album to be performed live. It quotes from "I'm Only Sleeping", a recording by The Beatles. Regarding the lack of trumpets in the song, trumpeter Lorimer stated, 'My impressions are that Mike found them noble, bright, pure, these sort of words. So, 'My love feels like trumpets'... I understand it at that level. It's such an ancient instrument, a martial instrument. Amongst swords and spears and shields being clattered about, someone sounds the trumpet and everyone hears that. It's the clarion call, the clarity of it finds its way through."

The title track, the last song on the original release, has a slower tempo than most of the other arrangements. Scott notes that he wrote over twenty verses for the song, some of which wound up included on the "alter ego" of "This Is the Sea", "That Was the River", which was released in 1994 on The Secret Life of the Waterboys. Waterboys chronicler Ian Abrahams wrote that the album and song were about Scott painting, "...a mystical, spiritual route that can be attained simply through letting-go of the mundane and trusting to the sanctity of the inner self." Abrahams further described the song as, "...an instruction to throw away the old and embrace the new, catch the train, see the previous existence as something old and gone. It's as though there is a split personality, the war raging inside the head, the mental anguish and the internal argument. This song gets right back into the thrust of "Don't Bang the Drum" and comes full circle, rejecting the soulless existence painted in the LP's opening moments and treating it as a journey, comparable with the traveling of the river into the sea. It's really the sentiment of somebody making a huge adjustment in their life and that really elucidates the theme of the album and points to a crossroads in Mike Scott's creative thinking."

"This Is the Sea" was first performed in Worcester on 2 December 1984, and a longer version than would eventually appear on the album, was played at a benefit concert for miners in February 1985. Despite these performances the song is seldom performed live as Scott finds it difficult to replace the studio's version's ocean effects in such a setting, also stating that he find the melody "very limiting " going on to say "My abilities with melodies have improved a lot, have developed a lot since those days, and that song doesn't really make it for me." The subject of the lyrics is conflicted about their present ("You've got a war in your head / And it's tearing you up inside"), and nostalgic for a past clarity ("And you know you once held the key"). The speaker instead argues that the past is irrelevant ("But that was the river / This is the sea)".

Those additional tracks on the re-release that are not alternative versions of songs originally appearing on the album were recorded in the same recording sessions.

"This Is the Sea" was played in the end credits to the documentary Riding Giants.

The chorus line "That was the river, this is the sea" (credited to Mike Scott) features as the epigraph to the final chapter of Andrew Chadwick's book The Hybrid Media System: Politics and Power.

== Critical reception ==
Professional ratings
Review scores
Source	Rating
AllMusic	4.5/5 stars
Encyclopedia of Popular Music	4/5 stars
Kerrang!	5/5 stars
Pitchfork	9.3/10
Record Mirror	4/5 stars

Upon its release, Malcolm Dome of Kerrang! described This Is the Sea as "a veritable shoal of musical ideas, held firm by a ballast of keyboard horizons and string tugs" and continued, "Best in this direction are 'Don't Bang the Drum', 'The Whole of the Moon', 'The Pan Within' and 'This Is the Sea', all of which hum and thrive with life in the fullest sense of the term. This isn't merely aural wallpaper but a strident, confident attempt at eliciting response; the art of texture and dynamics has rarely been better illustrated." Deanne Pearson of Number One concluded, "From Scott's vocals to the musical arrangements ripped through with piercing sax, it's rock music infused with heart and soul."

Music Week considered it to go "straight for the epic stuff in an uncommonly well realised manner" and added, "Scott is now a consummate songwriter and while his slightly clipped, almost folky vocal requires some listener tolerance the sheer power of this LP sweeps you away." Andy Strickland of Record Mirror called it "a fine LP" and noted Scott's "continued ability to [produce] excellent rock songs". He felt the album "takes up where A Pagan Place left off", but "disappointingly lacks the triumphant feel and classic consistency of its elder brother", noting that the "stubborn production [is] so similar that it veers dangerously towards being 'just another Waterboys album' rather than a step forward". He also believed it would have been improved with "a more diverse guitar sound, a bit more light and shade which is currently left to the excellent Scott voice".

In the US, Cash Box summarised, "With breathtaking, panoramic sweeps, Scott evidences his brilliance with every song. Scott's talent is rare." Rolling Stone's Parke Puterbaugh wrote, "Mike Scott is more of a poet than a songwriter, yet within his limitations he weaves trances so spellbinding that he has few peers among his musical contemporaries." Billboard described it as "punchy rock with an occasionally John Waite-ish lead vocal" and also praised the "imaginative orchestrations" and "solid songwriting".

In a retrospective review, Stephen Thomas Erlewine of AllMusic noted that This Is the Sea "expand[ed] the epic, multi-layered sound" of A Pagan Place and proved to be "a more ambitious yet more successful record, since it finds Mike Scott at his melodic peak". He added it has "enough strong, accessible moments to make Scott's indulgences forgivable". The Rough Guide to Rock called it an "unpolished nugget" which showcased Scott's vocals "beginning to mature into something very tasty indeed."

== Track listing ==
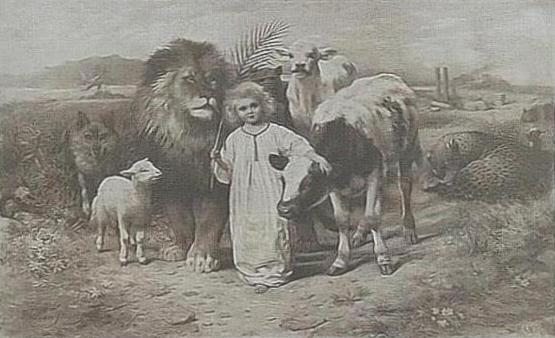
Peace, an 1896 etching by William Strutt, based upon Isaiah 11:6–7, was part of the album art for This Is the Sea.

All songs written by Mike Scott except where noted.

1. "Don't Bang the Drum" (Scott, Karl Wallinger) – 6:46
2. "The Whole of the Moon" – 4:58
3. "Spirit" – 1:50
4. "The Pan Within" – 6:13
5. "Medicine Bow" (Scott, Anthony Thistlethwaite) – 2:45
6. "Old England" – 5:32
7. "Be My Enemy" – 4:16
8. "Trumpets" – 3:37
9. "This Is the Sea" – 6:29

=== 2004 Expanded Edition bonus tracks ===
1. "Beverly Penn" – 5:38
2. "Sleek White Schooner" – 3:44
3. "Medicine Bow" (Full Length) (Scott, Thistlethwaite) – 5:44
4. "Medicine Jack" – 4:11
5. "High Far Soon" – 2:05
6. "Even the Trees Are Dancing" – 4:27
7. "Towers Open Fire" – 4:34
8. "This Is the Sea" (Live) – 5:53
9. "Then You Hold Me" – 4:56
10. "Spirit" (Full Length) – 4:11
11. "Miracle" – 1:14
12. "I Am Not Here" – 0:22
13. "Sweet Thing" (Van Morrison) – 7:11
14. "The Waves" – 6:38

== Personnel ==
The Waterboys

- Mike Scott – vocals, lead guitar, rhythm guitar, piano, percussion, synthesiser, drum machine programming, bells and effects
- Anthony Thistlethwaite – saxophone, double bass, bass guitar, mandolin
- Karl Wallinger – bass synth, piano, organ, keyboard programming, synthesiser, celeste, percussion and backing vocals

With:

- Steve Wickham – violin
- Marek Lipski – violin
- Roddy Lorimer – trumpet, background vocals
- Stewart Bartlett – French horn
- Kevin Wilkinson – bass guitar, drums
- Martin Swain – bass guitar
- Chris Whitten – drums, cymbals
- Pete Thomas – snare drum
- Martin Ditcham – percussion
- Max Edie – background vocals
- Lu Edmonds – bass
- Matthew Seligman – bass
- Adrian Johnston – piano (re-release only)

Production credits

- Mike Scott (tracks 1, 2 & 8)
- Mike Scott & Mick Glossop (tracks 5, 6, 7 & 9)
- Mike Scott, John Brand & Mick Glossop (track 4)
- Mike Scott, Mick Glossop & Karl Wallinger (track 3)
- Barry Clempson, Felix Kendall, Graham Dickson, John Brand, Keith Andrews, Mick Glossop, Nigel Gilroy – engineer
- Lynn Goldsmith – front cover photography

== Charts ==
=== Weekly charts ===
Weekly chart performance for This Is the Sea
Chart (1985–86)	Peak position
Australian Albums (Kent Music Report)	23
Canada Top Albums/CDs (RPM)	48
Dutch Albums (Album Top 100)	4
European Albums (Eurotipsheet)	70
New Zealand Albums (RMNZ)	6
UK Albums (Official Charts)	37
US Cash Box Top Albums 101 to 200	154
US AOR Albums (Radio & Records)	40

=== Year-end charts ===
Year-end chart performance for This Is the Sea
Chart (1986)	Position
Dutch Albums (Album Top 100)	54
New Zealand Albums (RMNZ)	32
