= The Whole of the Moon =

1985 single by the Waterboys

Single by the Waterboys

from the album This Is the Sea
- B-side: "Medicine Jack"; "Spirit"; "The Girl in the Swing"; "A Golden Age" (1991)
- Released: 14 October 1985
- Recorded: May 1985
- Studio: Livingstone (London), Amazon (Liverpool)
- Genre: Pop rock; post-punk; new wave; Celtic rock; heartland rock
- Length: 4:58
- Label: Ensign
- Songwriter: Mike Scott
- Producer: Mike Scott

The Waterboys singles chronology
"The Big Music" (1984)	"The Whole of the Moon" (1985)	"Don't Bang the Drum" (1985)

Audio sample
- The Whole of the Moon: file; help

"The Whole of the Moon" is a song by Scottish band the Waterboys, released as a single in October 1985 by Ensign Records from their third album, This Is the Sea (1985). It is a classic of the band's repertoire and has been consistently played at live shows ever since its release. Written and produced by Mike Scott, the song has inspired speculation regarding its subject.

The single was not a big success when initially released in 1985, only making the lower ends of the chart, although it reached No. 12 on the Australian chart. Subsequently, it became one of the Waterboys' best-known songs and their most commercially successful. It was the Ivor Novello Award winner "Best Song Musically and Lyrically" in 1992. Upon its re-release in March 1991, it reached No. 3 in the United Kingdom.

== Lyrics ==
The subject of the lyrics has inspired speculation, some of which has been rebutted by the writer. The song began as a "scribble on the back of an envelope on a wintry New York street", after Scott's girlfriend asked him if it was easy to write a song. Scott later said he was still young enough to want to show off to a girl, and said he could write one right then and there. He added further lyrics to the song upon returning to his hotel and after his return to London but in the first instance after this question from his girlfriend, he wrote about what he saw up in the sky.

Like the Waterboys' first single "A Girl Called Johnny", the song is a tribute to an inspirational figure or figures. In each line, the singer describes his own perspective and immediately contrasts it with that of the song's subject, summarizing the difference with the line "I saw the crescent / You saw the whole of the moon".

AllMusic instead suggests that its subject is a number of people who inspired Scott, including writer C. S. Lewis and the musician Prince. Scott himself says that he "couldn't have written" the song without having read Mark Helprin's novel Winter's Tale, but goes on to state that the song is not about Helprin. The official Waterboys website's Frequently Asked Questions clarifies that Scott has said that the song's subject is "a composite of many people", including C. S. Lewis, but explicitly states that it is not about Prince.

Musician Nikki Sudden, with whom Scott had collaborated before forming the Waterboys, has claimed that the song was written about him. In a 2020 interview, Scott specifically rejected claims that it was about Sudden or Prince: he said that he wrote a message "on the record's label saying, 'For Prince, U saw the whole of the moon'" as a reference to discussions between himself and Karl Wallinger about creating a Prince-inspired sound when they were recording the song. He explained:

The Whole of the Moon is about someone like CS Lewis, who seemed to see so much and explore issues much more deeply than most people, or it could be about a Jimi Hendrix–type person who comes "like a comet, blazing your trail" and is gone too soon, but it's not specifically about anyone.

Backing singer Max Edie said that Scott wrote all of his lyrics in a big black book that he had bought at a magic shop.

== Music ==
The band members at the time were Mike Scott, Anthony Thistlethwaite, Karl Wallinger, and Roddy Lorimer. Drummer Kevin Wilkinson had left the band by the time "The Whole of the Moon" was recorded and drums were played by session player Chris Whitten. Demoed but not finished at the beginning of the recording sessions, the song was eventually completed in May 1985.

Scott composed the song's piano part, which he described as "a self-taught rhythm with one finger doing one pattern and three fingers doing another", upon returning to the UK from New York.

1991 alternative sleeve

A feature of "The Whole of the Moon" is the trumpet work on the recording, courtesy of the classically trained Lorimer. Scott has said that he wanted the trumpets to have a similar impact to the flugelhorns on the Beatles' "Penny Lane": "like sunlight bursting through clouds". Lorimer spent three days with Scott working on the song's arrangement and "went home with a tape of the song and thought about a more classical approach. After a while sitting at the piano I came up with the idea of antiphonal trumpets. A piccolo trumpet on the left answered a piccolo on the right and then the same again, growing by adding a B♭ trumpet below each side of the stereo picture. Mike loved it, except the slightly jazzy chords I had used on the run down at the very end, which he simplified. I used the same classical approach later in the song, mixing two classical-type trumpets behind a later verse."

Lorimer also contributes falsetto background vocals to the song, while Thistlethwaite, another brass section member, performs a saxophone solo near the end, commencing after an explosion-like sound achieved by adding echo to a sound effect of a firework. Percussion was added by Martin Ditcham, who played what Scott described as "a bag of weird stuff that he rubbed together or shook". Wallinger provided synthesizer, synth bass and backing vocals: Scott has said that he asked Wallinger to play a synth line like the one on the Prince song "1999", and that another four-note melody used was inspired by another Prince song, "Paisley Park". Scott told Number One in 1985, "When we wrote and recorded the song, we wanted it to sound just like Prince. His records are really positive and that's something I like very much." Additional backing vocals were provided by Max Edie.

== Releases ==
"The Whole of the Moon" was first released on 14 October 1985 as a 7-inch and 12-inch single, which reached No. 26 on the UK Singles Chart. The song was re-released as a single (7-inch, 12-inch, cassette and CD) on 25 March 1991, and it was included on the band's compilation album The Best of the Waterboys 81–90, issued on 29 April 1991. The re-release was a big hit, peaking at No. 3 on the UK Singles Chart and receiving an Ivor Novello Award as "Best Song Musically and Lyrically" in 1991.

The 1991 releases of "The Whole of the Moon" and The Best of the Waterboys 81–90 was an attempt to boost the band's record sales to match their reputation. A survey of album buyers carried out by Chrysalis found that 11% considered themselves fans of the Waterboys and only 1% actually owned any of their singles or albums. "The Whole of the Moon" was partly chosen for re-release as a single because it had become popular on the dance and club scene since the late 1980s. Chrysalis chose to focus the single's promotion through retailers rather than radio as the label felt stations would be "wary of a reissue". Deals were made with music retailers and the marketing strategy included the use of press adverts, posters and counter cards. Nevertheless, the song was successful in gaining heavy airplay in the UK and across Europe. In the UK, it reached No. 3 on the Music & Media chart for most played records on BBC stations and major independents. It also reached No. 22 on the Music & Media European Airplay Top 50 chart.

The song was sung by Fiona Apple at the end of the 5-season TV series, “The Affair”. The song first appeared in a wedding rehearsal scene also in the final season of the daughter of the main character before reappearing again as the credits rolled ending the series.

The song was also featured on the soundtrack of Let it Snow, a 2019 American film.

Including the 2004 remastered album, the song has been officially released four times and appears on the following Waterboys albums:

- This Is the Sea (1985)
- Greenpeace Rainbow Warriors 2 CD Set (1989)
- The Best of The Waterboys 81–90 (1991)
- The Whole of the Moon: The Music of Mike Scott and the Waterboys (1998)
- This Is the Sea – special remastered 2CD edition (2004)
- Karma to Burn (live) (2005)

"The Whole of the Moon" remains one of the Waterboys' most famous and most financially successful songs. Scott said of the song's durability, "I guess it has timelessness in its sound and I know the lyrics mean a lot to people. If a lyric was true when it was written, it'll be true today. 'The Whole of the Moon' still means a lot to me and it's one of my old songs that I never tire of hearing or performing."

== Music video ==
The song's music video was directed by Meiert Avis for Midnight Films. It was shot at the Lyceum Theatre, London in November 1985. Scott sings live over an amended version of the record, on which fiddle and acoustic guitar were added at Wessex Studios, London. Lu Edmonds of Public Image Ltd. mimes the bass in the video. Steve Wickham, who joined the Waterboys shortly after the release of This Is the Sea, recorded his fiddle part in order to have a "genuine part" in the music video. The video achieved heavy action on Music Box and breakout rotation on MTV.

== Critical reception ==
Upon its release in 1985, Jane Simon of Sounds noted how "The Whole of the Moon" "sweeps you up in its vast, visionary embrace and swings you at the sky, as soprano saxes scream like shooting stars". Roger Morton of Record Mirror noted how the four tracks on the 12-inch single "draw out the drama in Scott's barnstorming pop poetry to raging effect" and "should bring water to both your eyes and your mouth". He considered Scott to sound "like a cross between" Bob Dylan and Cat Stevens. Jerry Smith of Music Week praised "The Whole of the Moon" as a "memorable number" that "should give them their first big hit". Richard Bryson of the Suffolk & Essex Free Press described the song as "curiously appealing". He noted its commercial potential, but added "there is also something a little elusive at the core of this record". In a review of the 1991 re-issue, Paul Lester, writing for Melody Maker, praised it as "the greatest single of October 1985".

== Track listings ==
=== 1985 release ===
- 7-inch single
1. "The Whole of the Moon" – 4:58
2. "Medicine Jack" – 4:10
- 12-inch single
1. "The Whole of the Moon" – 5:42
2. "Spirit" (full version) – 4:15
3. "Medicine Jack" – 4:10
4. "The Girl in the Swing" (live) – 4:51

=== 1991 release ===
- 7-inch and cassette single
1. "The Whole of the Moon" – 4:58
2. "A Golden Age" – 4:02
- 12-inch and CD single
1. "The Whole of the Moon" – 4:58
2. "A Golden Age" (Medley: "A Golden Age"/"Higher in Time"/"High Far Soon"/"Soon As I Get Home") – 12:03

== Personnel ==
- Max Edie – backing vocals
- Chris Whitten – drums, percussion
- Martin Ditcham – percussion
- Anthony Thistlethwaite – saxophone
- Karl Wallinger – synthesizer, bass (synthesizer), backing vocals
- Roddy Lorimer – trumpet
- Mike Scott – vocals, piano, guitar
- Mick Glossop – mixing

== Charts ==
=== Weekly charts ===
Chart (1985–1986)	Peak position
Australia (Kent Music Report)	12
Canada Top Singles (RPM)	71
Netherlands (Dutch Top 40)	21
Netherlands (Single Top 100)	19
New Zealand (Recorded Music NZ)	19
UK Singles (Official Charts)	26
US AOR Tracks (Radio & Records)	48

Chart (1991)	Peak position
Europe (Eurochart Hot 100)	3
Europe (European Hit Radio)	22
Ireland (IRMA)	2
UK Singles (Official Charts)	3
UK Airplay (Music Week)	2

=== Year-end charts ===
Chart (1986)	Position
Australia (Kent Music Report)	99

Chart (1991)	Position
UK Singles (OCC)	52

== Certifications ==
Region	Certification	Certified units/sales
United Kingdom (BPI)	2× Platinum	1,200,000^{‡}
^{‡} Sales+streaming figures based on certification alone.

== Release history ==
Region	Date	Format(s)	Label(s)	Ref.
United Kingdom	14 October 1985	7-inch vinyl; 12-inch vinyl	Ensign	
United Kingdom (re-release)	25 March 1991	7-inch vinyl; 12-inch vinyl; CD; cassette	Ensign	
Australia (re-release)	22 April 1991	7-inch vinyl; cassette	Ensign; Chrysalis	

== Covers ==
"The Whole of the Moon" was covered by Jennifer Warnes on her 1992 album The Hunter, by Mandy Moore on her 2003 album Coverage, by Human Drama on the compilation New Wave Goes to Hell, by folk singer-songwriter Peter Mulvey on his 1995 album Rapture, by Terry Reid on his album The Driver and by Susan McFadden on the Celtic Woman album Destiny. Steve Hogarth of Marillion has included it in his solo "h natural" shows. It was also a hit on the Balearic dance scene in the 1980s and has appeared on numerous other compilations.

Prince covered the song at Ronnie Scott's Jazz Club during his 2014 Hit & Run tour, and again at the Paisley Park Studios during a Dance Rally for Peace in May 2015. "He's so strict about people filming gigs on their phones, no one's posted it on YouTube," rued Mike Scott. "However, I understand it was a piano-and-vocal solo version. Boy, would I love to hear that."

Mike Scott included a live solo version on his 1995 single "Building the City of Light".

Frightened Rabbit covered the song for BBC Scotland's Hogmanay celebrations in 2012. After lead vocalist Scott Hutchison’s death, Mike Scott praised his vocal as full of emotion and truth.

U2 used it as their walk-up song during much of The Joshua Tree Tours 2017 and 2019. Scott said of U2's version "They performed it in a medley with 'Where the Streets Have No Name' on one of their tours, maybe 10 years ago, which was a very cool acknowledgement that the two songs have the same chorus melody. People keep telling me it plays just before they take the stage on their Joshua Tree tours, and that's supercool too. They must feel it sets the scene, and I can dig that."

The Killers covered the song at the 2018 Glasgow TRNSMT festival of which Brandon Flowers described it as "One of the finest songs I've ever heard" before dedicating it to all the women in the audience.

Kirin J. Callinan released a cover of the song and an accompanying video clip in 2019. The track marked the first single from Callinan's third album, Return To Center.

Fiona Apple recorded a cover of the song in 2019, which appeared in the finale of the Showtime TV series The Affair.

The electronic-house group Little Caesar released an indie dance version in the UK in 1990. It reached No. 68 in the UK Singles Chart.

In the Father Ted episode "Hell", Father Noel Furlong (Graham Norton) sings a very aggressive version with his youth group members in a caravan.

Bleachers regularly play a cover of the song at their shows including at their Radio City performance in July 2022. This cover was subsequently released as part of the live album Live at Radio City.

The American bluegrass band The Travelin' McCourys recorded a version for their 2025 album, One Chord That Rings True and it is part of their live repertoire, sung by bassist Alan Bartram.

British singer-songwriter Jack Garratt performed the song as part of a Sofa Session for BBC Radio 2 recorded at Maida Vale Studios in 2025. Following the response to his performance of the song, Garratt subsequently recorded and released a studio version of the song.

A cover by a one-off group under the name The Watergirls was released in 2026 as a tribute to Scottish DJ and producer, Keith McIvor aka JD Twitch who had died in 2025 after a diagnosis of glioblastoma. Centred around the core group of Mhairi McClymont, Teamy, and Pearl Wong, The Watergirls cover also featured contributions by Bob Weston, James Murphy, Mary Kiani, DJ and producer CC:Disco, and Fantastic Twins. The record, released by DFA Records raised funds for The Beatson Charity, and the Scottish Brain Tumour Research Centre of Excellence.
