= A Pagan Place =

Studio album by the Waterboys
- Released: 28 May 1984
- Recorded: November 1982 at Redshop Studio; September 1983 at Rockfield Studio
- Genre: Rock
- Length: 41:03
- Label: Ensign, Island, Chrysalis
- Producer: Mike Scott

The Waterboys chronology
The Waterboys (1983)	A Pagan Place (1984)	This Is the Sea (1985)

Singles from A Pagan Place
- 1. "The Big Music" Released: April 1984; 2. "Church Not Made with Hands" Released: July 1984; 3. "All the Things She Gave Me" Released: September 1984

A Pagan Place is the second studio album by the Waterboys, released by Ensign Records on 28 May 1984. It was the first Waterboys record with Karl Wallinger as part of the band and also includes Roddy Lorimer's first trumpet solo for the band on the track "A Pagan Place".

The album shares a title with the book A Pagan Place, written by Irish novelist Edna O'Brien. According to a post at the official Waterboys forum, Mike Scott, who chose the album name, has never read the book, and neither the album nor the title track share any other similarities with the novel.

== Production history ==
Recording for A Pagan Place was begun before either the band's first single, "A Girl Called Johnny", or album, The Waterboys, were released. The album comprises two recording sessions. The first, in November 1982 at Redshop Studio in London, involved Mike Scott, Anthony Thistlethwaite and Kevin Wilkinson. The second session, held September 1983 at Rockfield Studio in Wales, included contributions from Wallinger, who had joined the band that year. The four, the early band's core membership, were joined by Lorimer, Tim Blanthorn, and Eddi Reader, among others, for later overdubbing of the sessions to add full instrumentation to the recordings.

A remastered, edited and expanded version of A Pagan Place was issued in 2002 by Chrysalis Records. It added the song "Some of My Best Friends Are Trains", not present on the original LP release, as track 5, and replaced the original versions of "All the Things She Gave Me" and "The Thrill Is Gone" with their full, unedited versions. "The Thrill Is Gone" also features a different vocal take. In the sleeve notes, Scott explained that edited versions of the two songs were included to keep the duration of each side of the LP to around 20 minutes for sound quality reasons, although he has always considered the full, unedited versions to be the "real" ones.

== Songs ==
Cover for the single of "The Big Music", the title of which would define the Waterboys' early sound.

A Pagan Place expanded the Waterboys' treatment of spiritual themes beyond the Christian beliefs of "December" from The Waterboys. "A Church Not Made With Hands" is an ode to a woman who "is everywhere and no place / Her church not made with hands".

Both "All the Things She Gave Me" and "The Thrill is Gone" discuss the end of a romantic relationship. "Rags" and "Somebody Might Wave Back" discuss despair and optimism in loneliness. Scott's songwriting has been criticized as being overly introspective, and all four tracks contain some element of self-reflection. Wallinger later chose "The Thrill Is Gone" as his favourite Waterboys track that he did not play on.

"The Big Music" was released as a single, and became a descriptor of the sound of the album, the preceding debut The Waterboys and the following album This Is the Sea. Waterboys chronicler Ian Abrahams described the song as the album's defining track, with New Musical Express' Andrew Collins stating, "What a concept and what an albatross. A lilting anthem with grand cymbal slashes, soulful backing... a lazy, meandering essay." For the Waterboys' gig at London's Town & Country Club in 1985, backing vocals to the song were provided by Sinéad O'Connor, marking her first UK live appearance. Usage of the term "The Big Music" spread to include other bands with a similar sound. The single included "Bury My Heart" and "The Earth Only Endures". "Bury My Heart", a reference to "Bury My Heart at Wounded Knee", is described by Anderson as "a lament to the decimated American Red Indians". "The Earth Only Endures" is a traditional Sioux song arranged by Scott.

"Red Army Blues" first appeared on the twelve-inch single for "December" from The Waterboys. The song is a first-person narrative of the life of a young Soviet soldier in World War II who participates in the Battle of Berlin. The soldier, along with many others, is sent to the Gulag by Joseph Stalin. The song is based upon the books The Diary of Vikenty Angorov by Viktor Muravin and The Forgotten Soldier by Guy Sajer.

The final track of the original release, "A Pagan Place", featuring a trumpet solo from Lorimer, is an ambiguous questioning of the process of Christianising a Pagan culture.

The song "Cathy", included on the album's re-issue, was originally a Nikki Sudden song. Sudden writes about an evening in 1982 when he was staying in Scott's apartment: "Late that night – around midnight – Mike recorded a lead vocal to the backing track for my song, Cathy. We did a quick mix and that was that until twenty years ago [sic] when he includes the number on the reissue of his A Pagan Place album". This 2002 reissue credits Sudden as the song's author.

== Critical reception ==
Professional ratings
Review scores
Source	Rating
AllMusic	(original release)
Mojo	Favourable(re-release)
Q	(re-release)
Record Mirror	(original release)

Peter Anderson, writing in Record Collector, asserts that there was "unanimous critical acclaim". Upon its release, Fife Free Press wrote, "Theirs is music on the grand scale with Mike Scott vocalising his superb word pictures over widescreen arrangements which at times are quite breathtaking in their scope and imagination." The reviewer noted the album "contains no fillers", but highlighted the "striking epic ballad" "Red Army Blues", the "superb single" "The Big Music", the "impassioned" "Rags", with its "soaring guitar riffs", and the "utterly contagious" "Church Not Made with Hands". He recommended the album "unreservedly" and added it was a "certain choice for my top 20 albums of 1984".

Peter Anderson of the Torquay Herald Express called it "quite simply the best album" since U2's Boy and concluded, "If the Waterboys are not the band of 1984 I will eat my Biro." James Belsey of the Bristol Evening Post praised it as a "big, rich album full of powerful sounds, vocal and instrumental, and attractive songs" and added, "Terrific self-confidence... they sound as if they were already a megogroup." Alan McQuillan of the Western Daily Press considered it a "strong, determined album, a sort of Sixties Scots-born Springsteen, if that is possible, with lots of soaring sax and piano over simple guitar, bass and drums".

Eurotipsheet commented on the "inspired and almost possessed music and lyrics which will please the Dylan, Patti Smith and New York Dolls' fans". They picked "The Big Music" and "Somebody Might Wave Back" as the "strongest" tracks. In Canada, Kevin C. Wynne of RPM called it "nothing short of outstanding" and "perhaps destined to be the finest record of 1984". He noted Scott as the "focal point" and the "intelligent use of brass and pseudo-orchestral effects", which creates "a sense of majesty, of quests unfulfilled; that peculiar and pleasant sensation of longing and optimism which the truly great stuff induces".

== Track listing ==
All tracks written by Mike Scott, except "Cathy" on the reissued version of the album.

1. "Church Not Made with Hands" – 6:05
2. "All The Things She Gave Me" – 4:34
3. "The Thrill Is Gone" – 4:33
4. "Rags" – 5:21
5. "Somebody Might Wave Back" – 2:43
6. "The Big Music" – 4:45
7. "Red Army Blues" – 8:06
8. "A Pagan Place" – 5:13

=== Reissue track listing ===
1. "Church Not Made with Hands" – 6:02
2. "All the Things She Gave Me" (Unedited) – 5:32
3. "The Thrill Is Gone" (Unedited) – 5:30
4. "Rags" – 5:20
5. "Some of My Best Friends Are Trains" – 6:01
6. "Somebody Might Wave Back" – 2:43
7. "The Big Music" – 4:46
8. "Red Army Blues" – 8:03
9. "A Pagan Place" – 5:14
10. "The Late Train to Heaven" (Rockfield Mix) – 3:30
11. "Love That Kills" (Instrumental) – 6:20
12. "The Madness Is Here Again" – 3:59
13. "Cathy" (Nikki Sudden) – 2:35
14. "Down Through the Dark Streets" – 9:03

== Personnel ==
- Mike Scott – vocals, guitar, Danelectro Bellzouki electric 12-string guitar, piano, bass
- Anthony Thistlethwaite – saxophone, bass, mandolin
- Kevin Wilkinson – drums
- Karl Wallinger – piano, organ, percussion, backing vocals
- Roddy Lorimer – trumpet
- Tim Blanthorn – violin
- Barbara Snow
- Eddi Reader
- T.V. Smith
- Ingrid Schroeder
- Nick Linden

Technical

- Stephen W Tayler – mixing on tracks 2, 4, 6, 7, 9
- Jim Preen, John Brand, Richard Digby Smith, Stephen W Tayler, Ted Sharp – engineer
- Sheila Rock – photography

Notes:

- Credits taken from the back cover of the original release.
- A bellzouki is a type of electric 12-string guitar made by Danelectro.
- Barbara Snow plays trumpet on 'All The Things She Gave Me'.
- Eddi Reader, T.V. Smith and Ingrid Schroeder sing backing vocals on various tracks.
- On the original release, Nick Linden played bass on 'All The Things She Gave Me'. He plays on several other tracks on the extended reissue.

== Charts ==
Chart (1984–85)	Peak position
New Zealand Albums (RMNZ)	40
UK Albums (OCC)	100
