= Don't Bang the Drum =

Single by The Waterboys

from the album This Is the Sea
- B-side: "The Ways of Men"
- Released: 1985
- Length: 4:57 (single version); 6:46 (album version)
- Label: Island
- Songwriter(s): Mike Scott; Karl Wallinger
- Producer(s): Mike Scott

The Waterboys singles chronology
| "The Whole of the Moon" (1985) | "Don't Bang the Drum" (1985) | "Medicine Bow" (1985) |

"Don't Bang the Drum" is a song by British band the Waterboys, released as the opening track on their third studio album, This Is the Sea. It was written by Mike Scott and Karl Wallinger, and produced by Scott. The song was released as a single in Germany and was also issued as a 12" promotional vinyl in the United States.

== Background ==
"Don't Bang the Drum" originated as a set of lyrics Scott had written. Although he usually did this songwriting alone, Scott decided to hand over some lyrics to band members Anthony Thistlethwaite and Karl Wallinger as an experiment. Wallinger was given the lyrics for "Don't Bang the Drum" and came up with the music for it. Scott recalled in 2011: "He did a sassy, '60s-ish, Detroit rhythm, [with] great melodies and good chords. I really liked it, but I didn't like the groove. [So] I reconfigured it, first as a slow ballad and then later as the full-tilt rocker that's on the finished record."

After he wrote the first draft of the song, Wallinger demoed it at his home studio Seaview, where Scott also demoed a number of other songs that would appear on This Is the Sea. Scott recalled in 2004: "Karl's version had a different rhythm and feel, but established the melody and chords that are on the finished version [for This Is the Sea]".

The finished version for This Is the Sea was recorded at Livingston Recording Studios in London during May 1985. The trumpet in the song's intro was performed by Roddy Lorimer, which Scott described as being a "luminous high flying freeform trumpet solo in the style of 'Sketches of Spain' by Miles Davis, set against a dark 12 string guitar and piano landscape".

When This Is the Sea was presented to Island Records, Scott suggested holding back the release of "The Whole of the Moon" as a single in favour of "Don't Bang the Drum" or "Medicine Bow" first. He felt that "The Whole of the Moon" was a "demanding song [with] lyrics crucial to people's appreciation of it" and so releasing a rockier track first was more likely to "arouse the public's attention". However Scott was unable to convince the label and "The Whole of the Moon" was released as the first single.

== Critical reception ==
In a contemporary review of This Is the Sea, Roger Holland of Melody Maker commented: "'Don't Bang the Drums' calls out in fervent plea for individuality and excellence. An echo of the first album's defiant 'I Will Not Follow' and the contemptuous 'It Should Have Been You', it is itself reaffirmed by the blustery blur of 'Medicine Bow'." Dave Gingold of the Santa Cruz Sentinel described the song as "an explosive piece, with drums so tough the listener feels inclined to reach for a crash helmet".

Esther Murray of Spin wrote: "The first track is one enormous barreling, lurching slice of theater, opening with an ominously grandiloquent Spanish flamenco trumpet cadenza, an undercurrent of shimmering vibrations, acoustic guitar and piano rhythms shuddering delicately. As the trumpet climax seethes its agony, the introduction erupts into a hard rocking electric groove, Scott's invective jammed with thumping fear like the dying cries of a sacrificial animal." John Kovalic of The Capital Times described "Don't Bang the Drum" and "The Whole of the Moon" as "quite elaborate epics that would make even an ELO album sound sparse".

Mike Daly of The Age commented: "'Don't Bang the Drum' opens with a dramatic exhortation against militarism and man's destructive nature. What the lyrics lack, the musical arrangement makes up for: Lorimer's haughty Spanish trumpet ushers in wall-to-wall guitars, piano, ballzouki, crashing drums and wailing saxophone in a strutting rock orchestration." Mojo described the song's trumpet intro as "heady" and "goosebump-inducing" in their 2000 book The Mojo Collection: The Ultimate Music Companion. Trouser Press considered the song to be "insufferable amped-up guitar rock".

In a review of the demo version of "Don't Bang the Drum", which appeared on the 2011 release In a Special Place – The Piano Demos for This Is the Sea, James Christopher Monger of AllMusic felt the demo still retained the "sense of hopeful cynicism, youthful altruism, and righteous indignation" found on the finished recording. Zachary Houle of PopMatters considered the demo to provide a "sense that the song had ordinary origins". He wrote: "On In a Special Place, the song is stripped bare, with just the plinking of a light piano against Scott's echo-y vocals." He felt it allowed the listener to "appreciate the contributions" of Thistlethwaite and Wallinger on the finished version.

== Formats ==
7" single
| No. | Title | Length |
|---|---|---|
| 1. | "Don't Bang the Drum" (Edit) | 4:57 |
| 2. | "The Ways of Men" | 6:33 |

12" single (US promo)
| No. | Title | Length |
|---|---|---|
| 1. | "Don't Bang the Drum" (Vocal Edit) | 4:57 |
| 2. | "Don't Bang the Drum" (Vocal Edit) | 4:57 |

== Personnel ==
- Mike Scott - vocals, guitar, piano
- Anthony Thistlethwaite - saxophone
- Karl Wallinger - bass, keyboards
- Roddy Lorimer - trumpet
- Chris Whitten - drums

Production

- Mike Scott - producer, arranger and mixing on "Don't Bang the Drum"
- Mick Glossop - mixing on "Don't Bang the Drum"
- Harry Parker - producer of "The Ways of Men" (for BBC Radio 1 Peter Powell Show)

Other

- Lynn Goldsmith - photography
