= In a Special Place – The Piano Demos for This Is the Sea =

Compilation album by The Waterboys
- Released: 2011
- Length: 51:00
- Label: Chrysalis (Europe); Capitol (US)
- Producer: Mike Scott; John Brand; Karl Wallinger; Don Jackson

The Waterboys chronology
Book of Lightning (2007)	In a Special Place – The Piano Demos for This Is the Sea (2011)	An Appointment with Mr Yeats (2011)

In a Special Place – The Piano Demos for This Is the Sea is a compilation album by Scottish-Irish folk rock band The Waterboys. It was released in 2011 by Chrysalis (UK and Europe) and Capitol (US). The album reached No. 196 in the UK Top 200 Albums Chart.

In a Special Place is a selection of thirteen demos recorded by Scott in the spring of 1985. For the band's third studio album, This Is the Sea, Scott wrote up to 50 tracks and booked himself into Park Gates Studio, Hastings, England, with engineer and producer John Brand, to record "simple piano/vocal demos" that would assist him in reviewing the songs and choosing which ones to develop further. The last two tracks on the compilation are considered by Scott to be "extras". The demo of "Old England" was recorded at Wallinger's home studio, with Scott on vocal, piano and guitar, and Wallinger on snare drum and synth bass. The final track, "Trumpets", is a remix by Don Jackson of the original This Is the Sea recording.

== Reception ==
Professional ratings
Review scores
Source	Rating
AllMusic	3.5/5 stars
Record Collector	4/5 stars

Upon its release, Ian Abrahams of Record Collector considered the demos to "delineate an intensity and artistic passion that's palpable and inspiring". Speaking of the demos of songs that were later recorded for This Is the Sea, James Christopher Monger of AllMusic noted their "sense of hopeful cynicism, youthful altruism, and righteous indignation rings true". For those that were not included on This Is the Sea, he commented: "The[se] tracks are cut from the same vivacious cloth, and whether it's just Scott on piano trying to lock up with a drum machine, or Scott solo, it's hard not to get swept up in all the potential grandeur."

Zachary Houle of PopMatters felt the material would have been better placed on an expanded edition of This Is the Sea, rather than a separate release. He commented: "As an "album" in and of itself, In a Special Place doesn't really hold up, because even the tracks featuring completely unreleased material tends to be fragmented and incomplete." He concluded the album was "more of an academic implementation than an actual collection of material that truly means something."

== Track listing ==
All tracks are written by Mike Scott except "Don't Bang the Drum" by Scott and Karl Wallinger

No.	Title	Length
1.	"Don't Bang the Drum"	3:14
2.	"Be My Enemy"	3:56
3.	"All the Bright Horses"	0:40
4.	"Custer's Blues"	3:29
5.	"Beverly Penn"	5:23
6.	"The Day I Ran Out of People"	2:04
7.	"The Pan Within"	4:32
8.	"Winter in the Blood"	4:10
9.	"The Woman in Me"	2:41
10.	"Looking for Dickon"	2:18
11.	"Paris in the Rain"	4:29
12.	"Talk About Wings"	1:03
13.	"The Whole of the Moon"	5:42
14.	"Old England"	4:02
15.	"Trumpets" (Headstrong Remix 2011)	3:24

== Personnel ==
Production

- Mike Scott - producer (tracks 1–15)
- John Brand - producer (tracks 1–13)
- Karl Wallinger - producer (track 14)
- Don Jackson - producer, remix (track 15)
- Dick Beetham - mastering

Other

- Tim Chacksfield - project co-ordinator
- Scott Minshall - design
- Colm Henry, Patrick Durand - photography

== Charts ==
Chart (2011)	Peak position
UK Albums Chart	196
