= The Hunter (Jennifer Warnes album) =

Studio album by Jennifer Warnes
- Released: June 9, 1992
- Studios: Acme Studios (Los Angeles); Amigo Studios (Los Angeles); Capitol Studios (Los Angeles); Conway Recording Studios (Los Angeles); Groovemasters (Los Angeles); Soundcastle (Los Angeles); The Village Recorder (Los Angeles); The Hit Factory (New York City); River Sound (New York City)
- Genre: Rock
- Length: 45:51
- Label: Private Music
- Producers: Jennifer Warnes; Roscoe Beck; Elliot Scheiner

Jennifer Warnes chronology
Famous Blue Raincoat (1987)	The Hunter (1992)	The Well (2001)

Professional ratings
Review scores
Source	Rating
AllMusic	3/5 stars
Calgary Herald	A
Encyclopedia of Popular Music	3/5 stars

The Hunter is the seventh studio album by Jennifer Warnes, released in 1992.

The Hunter was released five years after her acclaimed album Famous Blue Raincoat. Classified as adult contemporary, the album is jazz/R&B infused. The album includes two covers, Todd Rundgren's "Pretending To Care" and The Waterboys "The Whole Of The Moon", as well as "Way Down Deep", co-written by Warnes, Amy La Television, and Warnes's mentor Leonard Cohen.

== Track listing ==
1. "Rock You Gently" (Henry Gaffney, Gregory Abbott) – 4:24
2. "Somewhere, Somebody" (Larry John McNally, Andrew Kastner, Max Carl) – 2:47
3. "Big Noise, New York" (Donald Fagen, Marcelle Clements) – 5:02
4. "True Emotion" (Jennifer Warnes, John Fannin, Bill Ginn) – 4:05
5. "Pretending to Care" (Todd Rundgren) – 4:43
6. "The Whole of the Moon" (Mike Scott) – 5:00
7. "Lights of Lousianne" (Warnes, Rob Muerer, Nancy Bacal) – 4:24
8. "Way Down Deep" (Amy LaTelevision, Warnes, Leonard Cohen) – 5:45
9. "The Hunter" (Warnes) – 4:52
10. "I Can't Hide" (Warnes) – 4:49

== Personnel ==
- Jennifer Warnes – lead vocals, backing vocals (1, 2, 6, 8), ornithologist (7), additional voice (10)
- Roscoe Beck – synthesizers (1, 3), guitars (1), bass and drum programming (1), synth strings (3), programming (3), bass (3, 4, 6, 9, 10), horn arrangements (3), string bass (5, 7)
- Bill Ginn – synthesizers (1), Synclavier (5, 9), acoustic piano (6), marxophone (6), keyboard arrangements (9), string arrangements (9), keyboards (10)
- Russell Ferrante – keyboards (3, 4, 8), Hammond organ (4)
- Larry Steelman – synth strings (3)
- Randy Kerber – acoustic piano (5), synthesizers (5)
- Stephen Croes – Synclavier (5, 6, 9)
- Rob Meurer – synthesizers (7, 10), keyboards (10)
- Van Dyke Parks – accordion (7), arrangements (7)
- Kim Bullard – keyboards (9)
- Michael Landau – guitars (1, 3, 6), lead guitar (4)
- David Mansfield – guitars (1), ornithologist (7), lap steel guitar (8), fiddle (8)
- Robben Ford – guitars (3), lead guitar (4), rhythm guitar (4)
- David Grissom – guitars (6), acoustic guitar (8)
- Eric Johnson – nylon-string guitar (7), slide guitar (10)
- Richard Thompson – electric guitar (7)
- Mitch Watkins – acoustic guitar (7), archtop guitar (7)
- Jorge Calderón – bass (2, 8)
- Vinnie Colaiuta – drums (1, 3, 4, 6, 9, 10)
- John Robinson – drums (3)
- Tom Brechtlein – drums (10)
- Lenny Castro – percussion (1–6, 10), shaker (7, 8), ornithologist (7), congas (8), seed pod (8), tambourine (8)
- Paulinho da Costa – congas (8), dumbek (8), shaker (8), talking drum (8)
- Steve Forman – surdo (8), tar (8), rhythm composer (8)
- Judd Miller – wind synthesizer (1, 5, 6, 9)
- Bob Malach – saxophones (1)
- Larry Williams – saxophones (1)
- Bill Reichenbach Jr. – trombone (1)
- Jerry Hey – flugelhorn (1)
- Stephen Barber – horn arrangements (5, 6), string arrangements (5, 6), Synclavier (6)
- Suzie Katayama – cello (7)
- Larry Corbett – cello (9)
- Novi Novog – viola (7)
- Robert Becker – viola (9)
- Joel Derouin – violin (5–7, 9)
- Sid Page – violin (7, 9)
- Perla Batalla – backing vocals (1, 2)
- Max Carl – lead vocals (2), backing vocals (2)
- Donald Fagen – backing vocals (3)
- Frank Floyd – backing vocals (3)
- Kevin Dorsey – backing vocals (4, 8)
- Phillip Ingram – backing vocals (4)
- Arnold McCuller – backing vocals (4)
- Blondie Chaplin – lead vocals (8)

=== Production ===
- Jennifer Warnes – producer
- Roscoe Beck – producer
- Elliot Scheiner – producer, engineer, mixing
- Rob Meurer – original track producer (7, 10)
- Jorge Calderón – original track producer (8, 9)
- Walter New – associate producer, engineer
- Chet Himes – original track engineer (7, 10)
- Steven Strassman – original track engineer (7, 10)
- Paul Dieter – assistant engineer
- David Dill – assistant engineer
- Mark Harder – assistant engineer
- Sarah Jarman – assistant engineer
- Charlie Paakkari – assistant engineer
- Marnie Riley – assistant engineer
- Tom Winslow – assistant engineer
- Martin Brumbach – mix assistant
- Chris Bellman – digital editing
- Bernie Grundman – mastering at Bernie Grundman Mastering (Hollywood, California)
- Veronica Albano – album coordinator
- Melanie Penny – art direction, design
- Peter DeLory – photography
- Donald Miller – management
