= The Waterboys (album) =

Studio album by the Waterboys
- Released: 15 July 1983
- Recorded: December 1981 – November 1982
- Studio: Redshop Studios, London, England; Farmyard Studios, Little Chalfont, Buckinghamshire, England
- Genre: Post-punk
- Length: 43:14
- Label: Ensign; Chrysalis; Island
- Producer: Mike Scott; Rupert Hine

The Waterboys chronology
| The Waterboys (1983) | A Pagan Place (1984) |

Singles from The Waterboys
- 1. "A Girl Called Johnny" Released: March 1983; 2. "December" Released: October 1983

Professional ratings
Review scores
| Source | Rating |
|---|---|
| AllMusic | 4/5 stars |
| Q | 4/5 stars |
| Mojo | (favourable) |
| Rolling Stone | 3/5 stars |

The Waterboys is the debut studio album by the Waterboys, released by Ensign Records in July 1983. The album was recorded in several studio sessions between December 1981 and November 1982. AllMusic describes the sound of the album as "part Van Morrison, part U2".

The album cover is a photograph of lead singer Mike Scott by Panny Charrington and designed by Stephanie Nash. The Waterboys logo appears in the pale blue box in the upper right-hand corner of the original album cover (pale pink on 2002 reissue). The symbol, which symbolizes water, continued to be used throughout the band's history. It was designed by Stephanie Nash of Island Records.

== Production history ==
In 1981 Mike Scott was working in the punk rock band Funhouse, who had recently changed their name from Another Pretty Face. Signed to the record label Ensign Records, the group had moved to London to record their music. Scott had been unsatisfied with the group's sound, which he described as "similar to a jumbo jet flying on one engine". In December 1981 he decided to use Redshop Studio to record some of his own songs, after prompting from Ensign Records to consider a solo career. The demos resulted in five songs where Scott sang, played the piano and guitar, and used a drum machine. Two recordings from this studio demo session would eventually make their way onto the first Waterboys album, "December" and "The Three Day Man". The quality of the session convinced Scott to leave Funhouse. Scott made further series' of recordings on his own at Redshop in February, April and August 1982, which yielded the following tracks: "Savage Earth Heart", "It Should Have Been You", "Gala" and "Where Are You Now When I Need You?".

In spite of his label's advice, Scott instead began forming a new band to work with. In early 1982 he recruited saxophonist Anthony Thistlethwaite for the new project, which became the Waterboys. Scott first heard Thistlethwaite on a Nikki Sudden album. Thistlethwaite recruited his friend drummer Kevin Wilkinson. Sudden describes the events as Scott "stealing" the two musicians, but he also notes that Scott could afford to pay Thistlethwaite and Wilkinson, whereas Sudden could not. Scott and Thistlethwaite recorded "A Girl Called Johnny" in Spring of 1982, and with Wilkinson and bassist Nick Linden they recorded further new tracks in November 1982 at Redshop Studio, Islington, of which one, "I Will Not Follow", appears on this album.

Ensign flew Scott to New York to record with producer Lenny Kaye, who had previously worked with Patti Smith. The recording session went poorly, and the material was not released in favour of recordings from the various London sessions. After two single releases of "A Girl Called Johnny" in March 1983, The Waterboys was released that July.

A remastered version of the album with a number of extra tracks was released on 23 April 2002 by Capitol Records.

== Songs ==
"A Girl Called Johnny" had been released both as a seven-inch and as a 12-inch single in March 1983, preceding the album by four months. The song, a tribute to Patti Smith, "narrowly failed" to become a hit. The B-side on the seven-inch was "The Late Train to Heaven", the "Rockfield mix" of which was eventually released on a re-issue of A Pagan Place, the group's next album. The twelve-inch contained "Ready for the Monkey House", the Another Pretty Face song "Out of Control" and an acoustic version of "Somebody Might Wave Back", the last of which would appear in a full studio version on A Pagan Place.

"December" was also released as a single (for the Christmas season) in both seven-inch and twelve-inch formats, with similar commercial results. The seven-inch's B-side was "Where are You Now When I Need You?", while the twelve-inch included an alternate recording of "The Three Day Man" and "Red Army Blues", a song that would be included on A Pagan Place.

An extended live version of "Savage Earth Heart", a song which had eventually become a "live show stopper" was re-released as a B-side on the single for "Is She Conscious?" from A Rock in the Weary Land.

== Critical reception ==
Upon its release, Neil Haverson of the Herts and Essex Observer considered the Waterboys to "breathe new life into the stale and stagnant musical form [of] rock" and called Scott "a mixture of Mick Jagger and Bruce Springsteen". He described the album as "deeply personal, from the religious discussion on 'December', the savage intensity of 'I Will Not Follow' to the anger, damnation and finally hope on 'Savage Earth Heart'". He concluded, "The Waterboys have arrived like a tidal wave. Dive in and drown." Robin Denselow of The Guardian predicted Scott would achieve success in the future "if the current trend for more passionate pop keeps up, for he mixes a blend of Sixties and Seventies influences with a welcome freshness and enthusiasm". He continued, "With an impassioned voice and good piano work to help him, he should do well when he settles into a style more distinctively his own."

== Track listing ==
All songs written by Mike Scott, unless otherwise noted.

=== Original album release ===
The original vinyl LP had eight tracks.

1. "December"
2. "A Girl Called Johnny"
3. "The Three Day Man"
4. "Gala"
5. "I Will Not Follow"
6. "It Should Have Been You"
7. "The Girl in the Swing"
8. "Savage Earth Heart"

=== Mini LP album release ===
The original US and Canadian release (1984) had five tracks.

1. "A Girl Called Johnny" – 3:54
2. "I Will Not Follow" – 5:14
3. "It Should Have Been You" – 4:32
4. "December" – 6:45
5. "Savage Earth Heart" – 6:40

=== Re-release track list ===
The 2002 re-release contained additional songs, from the original demo recordings, single releases, and other early Waterboys work.

1. "December" – 6:48
2. "A Girl Called Johnny" – 3:57
3. "The Three Day Man" – 4:08
4. "Gala" (Unedited) – 9:31
5. "Where Are You Now When I Need You?" – 5:06
6. "I Will Not Follow" – 5:18
7. "It Should Have Been You" – 4:30
8. "The Girl in the Swing" – 4:27
9. "Savage Earth Heart" – 6:40
10. "Something Fantastic" – 3:12
11. "Ready for the Monkeyhouse" – 3:59
12. "Another Kind of Circus" – 4:05 (Scott, John Caldwell)
13. "A Boy in Black Leather" – 7:04
14. "December" (Original 8-track mix) – 6:49
15. "Jack of Diamonds" – 0:50 (Los Haward, Scott)

== Personnel ==
- Mike Scott – vocals, piano, guitar, Danelectro Bellzouki electric 12-string guitar, bass guitar, mandolin
- Anthony Thistlethwaite – saxophone and percussion on "A Girl Called Johnny"; saxophone and backing vocals on "I Will Not Follow"
- Kevin Wilkinson – "some" drums and backing vocals on "I Will Not Follow"
- Delahaye (alias of Mike Scott) – organ
- Nick Linden – bass guitar and backing vocals on "I Will Not Follow"
- Norman Rodger – bass guitar on "It Should Have Been You"
- Ray Massey – "some" drums on "The Girl in the Swing"; percussion on "A Girl Called Johnny"
- Rupert Hine – percussion on "A Girl Called Johnny"; programming on "December"
- Stephen W Tayler – bass; keyboards on "Gala"; programming on "December" and "It Should Have Been You"

Technical

- Rupert Hine – producer on "A Girl Called Johnny"
- Jim Preen, Stephen W Tayler – engineer
- Jason Stokes – engineer on "The Girl in the Swing"
- Panni Charrington – photography
