= The Big Music =

Single by The Waterboys

from the album A Pagan Place
- B-side: "The Earth Only Endures"
- Released: 2 April 1984
- Label: Ensign; Island
- Songwriter: Mike Scott
- Producer: Mike Scott

The Waterboys singles chronology
"December" (1983)	"The Big Music" (1984)	"Church Not Made with Hands" (1984)

"The Big Music" is a song by British band the Waterboys, released on 2 April 1984 as the lead single from their second studio album A Pagan Place. The song was written and produced by Mike Scott.

The name "Big Music" was adopted by some commentators as a description of the early Waterboys' sound and is still used to refer to the musical style of their first three albums.

== Writing ==
Scott wrote "The Big Music" while living at Aldridge Road Villas, Notting Hill, West London. In a 1984 interview with New Musical Express, Scott said of the song, "It's really difficult to describe something that there's no words for. It's not about music, it's more like a religious thing. And it's a very serious song." He added in a 1985 interview with the magazine, "There are numerous lines in that song that illustrate in depth what the Big Music is and what I'm meaning. I worked hard on that lyric over a considerable period of time to say exactly what I intended."

== Recording ==
"The Big Music" was recorded at Rockfield and Farmyard Studios during the Autumn of 1983. The song's two lead and two rhythm guitar parts were performed by Scott on his Danelectro "Bellzouki" 12-string guitar. The song features Eddi Reader on backing vocals, during the early phase of her career when she was working as a session vocalist in London.

In 2015, Scott recalled of the vision for the song's recording, "Most of the songs I did at that time I produced myself like 'The Big Music'. I had written that and I had imagined all the brass lines and backing vocals. I figured it all in my head first and then just went in the studio and made it."

== Music video ==
The song's music video was directed by John Mills and shot at the Lake District in March 1984. Scott was later critical of the video in his autobiography, "The concept made me cringe - bigness, outdoors, mountains, awful clichés of the time, and not what my song was about. I knew it was gonna be bad but it was out of my hands, I couldn't control it. I told [Island Records] not to use the video, and miraculously it was mostly buried till the YouTube age."

== Critical reception ==
On its release, Charles Shaar Murray of NME considered "The Big Music" "quite an epic" and added, "Here Scott recounts an experience of being carried away with such visionary passion that he and his admirable sax player almost carry the listener right along." Debbi Voller of Number One described it as a "full bodied, Big Country kind of sound". Jerry Smith of Music Week wrote, "A big production for this slow, bluesy song with a wonderful sax line and a tortured vocal, backed up with a slow building horn section." He considered the song to be "in a similar vein" to Wah!'s 1982 hit "The Story of the Blues" and felt "with enough exposure it could be as big a hit". Dave Henderson of Sounds praised it as "rousing stuff" and noted the "fantastically enormous sound" which he felt sounded like "at least 300 people playing on it". The Torquay Herald Express called it "great stuff".

In a review of A Pagan Place, Mike Daly of The Age noted the song "fashions a spectacular Hadrian's Wall of sound around the slow, soulful melody". Diana Valois of The Morning Call considered it "joyfully proud, creating exhilarating and intoxicating rushes not unlike Springsteen's 'Night'". Tom Harrison of The Province felt it "approximately describes the magnitude of the LP's eight tracks" and added "there is nothing small about the ambitions of Mike Scott". In a 2017 retrospective on the "best of Mike Scott", Tom Doyle of Q included "The Big Music" as one of ten tracks on the list and described it as a "yearning rocker".

== Live performances ==
"The Big Music" was performed as part of the earliest Waterboys concerts from February 1984, but was dropped from the set in April. In a summer 1984 interview with New Musical Express, Scott said of his reluctance to perform the song live, "We don't do that live. There's no way I can sing it. It's too big! I can't get my emotions round that in a live context. 'Big Music' describes a state of mind that doesn't apply most of the time. If I went on stage after a day full of epiphanies I could sing [it]. But if I can't turn it on I won't do it."

The song returned as a regular feature to the setlist from October 1984, and the band continued to perform it throughout 1985 and 1986. A 1985 performance of the song at London's Town & Country Club featured backing vocals from Sinéad O'Connor in her first UK live appearance. Scott frequently performed the song on the 1995–96 tour promoting his debut solo album Bring 'Em All In.

== Formats ==
7" single
No.	Title	Length
1.	"The Big Music"	4:37
2.	"The Earth Only Endures"	5:06

7" single (New Zealand)
No.	Title	Length
1.	"The Big Music"	4:37
2.	"All the Things She Gave Me"	4:34

7" single (UK promo)
No.	Title	Length
1.	"The Big Music (Radio Edit)"	4:16
2.	"The Big Music (Full Length Version)"	4:37

12" single
No.	Title	Length
1.	"The Big Music"	4:37
2.	"Bury My Heart"	6:23
3.	"The Earth Only Endures"	5:06

12" single (European release #2)
No.	Title	Length
1.	"The Big Music"	4:37
2.	"A Pagan Place"	5:09
3.	"The Earth Only Endures"	5:06

== Personnel ==
The Waterboys

- Mike Scott – vocals, guitar
- Eddi Reader – backing vocals
- Karl Wallinger – piano
- Anthony Thistlethwaite – saxophone, bass
- Roddy Lorimer – trumpet
- Kevin Wilkinson – drums

Production

- Mike Scott – producer (all tracks)
- Ted Sharp – engineer on "The Big Music"
- Steven W. Tayler – engineer on "The Big Music" and "The Earth Only Endures"
- Jim Preen – engineer on "Bury My Heart"

== Charts ==
Chart (1984)	Peak position
UK Singles Chart (OCC)	124
