= An Appointment with Mr Yeats =

An Appointment with Mr. Yeats

Studio album by the Waterboys
- Released: 19 September 2011
- Recorded: London, Dublin
- Genre: Rock
- Label: Puck
- Producers: Mike Scott, Marc Aciero

The Waterboys chronology
In a Special Place – The Piano Demos for This Is the Sea (2011)	An Appointment with Mr. Yeats (2011)	Modern Blues (2015)

An Appointment with Mr. Yeats is the tenth studio album by the Waterboys, released on 19 September 2011 through W14/Proper Records. The album contains 14 tracks, all of which are based upon the poetry of W. B. Yeats, a long term influence on lead-songwriter Mike Scott.

Scott premiered the tracks which would make up the album, as well as those produced previously, as part of the An Appointment with Mr. Yeats concerts from 2010 onwards. Some shorter tracks such as "Down by the Salley Gardens" were either omitted entirely, or provided as bonus tracks available for download only.

== Track listing ==
1. "The Hosting of the Shee"
2. "The Song of Wandering Aengus"
3. "News for the Delphic Oracle"
4. "A Full Moon in March"
5. "Sweet Dancer"
6. "White Birds"
7. "The Lake Isle of Innisfree"
8. "Mad As the Mist and Snow"
9. "Before the World Was Made"
10. "September 1913"
11. "An Irish Airman Foresees His Death"
12. "Politics"
13. "Let the Earth Bear Witness"
14. "The Faery's Last Song"

=== Amazon ===
- Bonus Track "Four Ages of Man"

=== iTunes ===
- Bonus Track "Love Song"
- Bonus Track "The Mask"

== Personnel ==
- Mike Scott - vocals, 6- & 12-string acoustic & electric guitars, keyboards (including acoustic & electric pianos, organ, flute organ, Mellotron, synthesized cello/horns/flute/mountain horn), 8-string bouzouki, percussion (hand drum, tiny cymbals, deep drum, snare drum, cabasa), programming, effects, treatments, "loop archaeology" on 'White Birds'
- Marc Arciero - bass guitar (credited throughout as "earth resonator")
- Ralph Salmins - drums (including "orc-drums" on 'The Hosting of the Shee'), tambourine
- Steve Wickham - fiddles (including "pogged" and "fuzz" fiddles), "white birds" on 'White Birds'
- James Hallawell - keyboards (including Hammond & Nord organs, piano, synthesized "etheric strings")
- Kate St. John - saxophone, oboe, cor anglais
- Blaise Margail - trombone
- Sarah Allen - flute
- Joe Chester - guitars, harmonium, additional vocals
- Katie Kim - vocals (including whispers on 'The Lake Isle of Innisfree')
- Freddie Stevenson - vocals
