= The Well (Jennifer Warnes album) =

Studio album by Jennifer Warnes
- Released: September 4, 2001
- Genre: Rock
- Length: 48:10
- Label: Music Force
- Producers: Martin Davich, Jennifer Warnes,

Jennifer Warnes chronology
The Hunter (1992)	The Well (2001)	Another Time, Another Place (2018)

Professional ratings
Review scores
Source	Rating
AllMusic	4.5/5 stars

The Well is the eighth studio album by Jennifer Warnes. It was released in 2001, Warnes' first album in nine years. It includes her own compositions and covers renowned songwriters Arlo Guthrie, Billy Joel, Allen Toussaint and Tom Waits. Guthrie lends guest vocals to his "Patriot's Dream" while Doyle Bramhall duets with Warnes on the classic Eddy Arnold song "You Don't Know Me". Bramhall, father of guitarist Doyle Bramhall II, co-wrote The Well, The Panther, and, on the expanded version, La Luna Bria, with Spanish translation by Alfred Guzman, Sr. The album has been reissued over the years, first in 2003 in the Super Audio CD format, and then in 2009 with additional bonus tracks. The album saw its debut European release in 2016, when it was released by BMG records on March 4.

== Track listing ==
1. "The Well" (Jennifer Warnes, Doyle Bramhall II) – 4:47
2. "It's Raining" (Allen Toussaint) – 3:26
3. "Prairie Melancholy" (Warnes, Nancy Bacal) – 5:44
4. "Too Late Love Comes" (Warnes) – 4:21
5. "Invitation to the Blues" (Tom Waits) – 5:12
6. "And So It Goes" (Billy Joel) – 4:37
7. "The Panther" (Warnes, Bramhall) – 4:23
8. "You Don't Know Me" (Eddy Arnold, Cindy Walker) – 2:59
9. "The Nightingale" (Jude Johnstone) – 5:32
10. "Patriot's Dream" (Arlo Guthrie) – 5:15
11. "The Well (reprise)" (Warnes, Bramhall) – 1:54

2003 SACD bonus track 12. "Loco Girl" – 5:10

2009 reissue track listing

1. "The Well" (Jennifer Warnes, Doyle Bramhall II) – 4:47
2. "It's Raining" (Allen Toussaint) – 3:26
3. "Prairie Melancholy" (Warnes, Nancy Bacal) – 5:44
4. "Too Late Love Comes" (Warnes) – 4:21
5. "La Luna Brilla" – 4:47
6. "Fool for the Look (In Your Eye) – 3:23
7. "Invitation to the Blues" (Tom Waits) – 5:12
8. "And So It Goes" (Billy Joel) – 4:37
9. "The Panther" (Warnes, Bramhall) – 4:23
10. "You Don't Know Me" (Eddy Arnold, Cindy Walker) – 2:59
11. "The Nightingale" (Jude Johnstone) – 5:32
12. "Patriot's Dream" (Arlo Guthrie) – 5:15
13. "The Well (reprise)" (Warnes, Bramhall) – 1:54
14. "Show Me the Light" (duet with Bill Medley) (bonus track on CD edition) – 4:34
15. "Born in Time" (bonus track exclusive to the LP edition)

2016 UK edition

1. "The Well" (Jennifer Warnes, Doyle Bramhall II) – 4:47
2. "It's Raining" (Allen Toussaint) – 3:26
3. "Prairie Melancholy" (Warnes, Nancy Bacal) – 5:44
4. "Too Late Love Comes" (Warnes) – 4:21
5. "La Luna Brilla" – 4:47
6. "Fool for the Look (In Your Eye) – 3:23
7. "Invitation to the Blues" (Tom Waits) – 5:12
8. "And So It Goes" (Billy Joel) – 4:37
9. "The Panther" (Warnes, Bramhall) – 4:23
10. "You Don't Know Me" (Eddy Arnold, Cindy Walker) – 2:59
11. "The Nightingale" (Jude Johnstone) – 5:32
12. "Patriot's Dream" (Arlo Guthrie) – 5:15
13. "The Well (reprise)" (Warnes, Bramhall) – 1:54

== Personnel ==
- Jennifer Warnes – vocals, background vocals
- Martin Davich – piano, synthesizer, harmonium, keyboards, background vocals
- Doyle Bramhall – associate producer, vocals, drums
- Doyle Bramhall II – guitar, vocals
- Dean Parks – guitar, mandolin
- Vinnie Colaiuta – drums
- George Doering – guitar, mandolin
- Abraham Laboriel – bass
- Rick Cunha – guitar
- Armando Compean – bass
- Dave Stone – bass
- Greg Leisz – pedal steel guitar
- Leland Sklar – bass
- Simeon Pillich – bass
- Alex Acuña – drums
- Steve Porcaro – synthesizer
- Denny Freeman – piano
- Matt Cartsonis – mandolin
- Van Dyke Parks – accordion
- Lenny Castro – percussion
- John Spooner – field drums
- Eric Rigler – bagpipe, Uilleann pipes, whistles
- Max Carl – background vocals
- Blondie Chaplin – vocals, background vocals
- Kenny Edwards – background vocals
- Arlo Guthrie – vocals, background vocals
