= Viktor Muravin =

Viktor Muravin (born 1929) is an author, best known for his novel Aurora Borealis, also published under the title The Diary of Vikenty Angarov. Born in Vladivostok, in his youth he joined the Pioneers and the Komsomol. He worked as a horse-wrangler and agricultural worker, and by 1978 he lived in New York City. His novel, partly based on a friend's experiences describes the survival of former sea-captain Angarov in the labor camps of Siberia.

== Works ==
- Muravin, Viktor (1978). The Diary of Vikenty Angarov. New York: Newsweek Books. ISBN 0-88225-254-2.
- Muravin, Viktor (1978). Viktor Muravin: Collection of Works. Viktor Muravin.
