= The Waterboys =

Irish and Scottish folk rock band

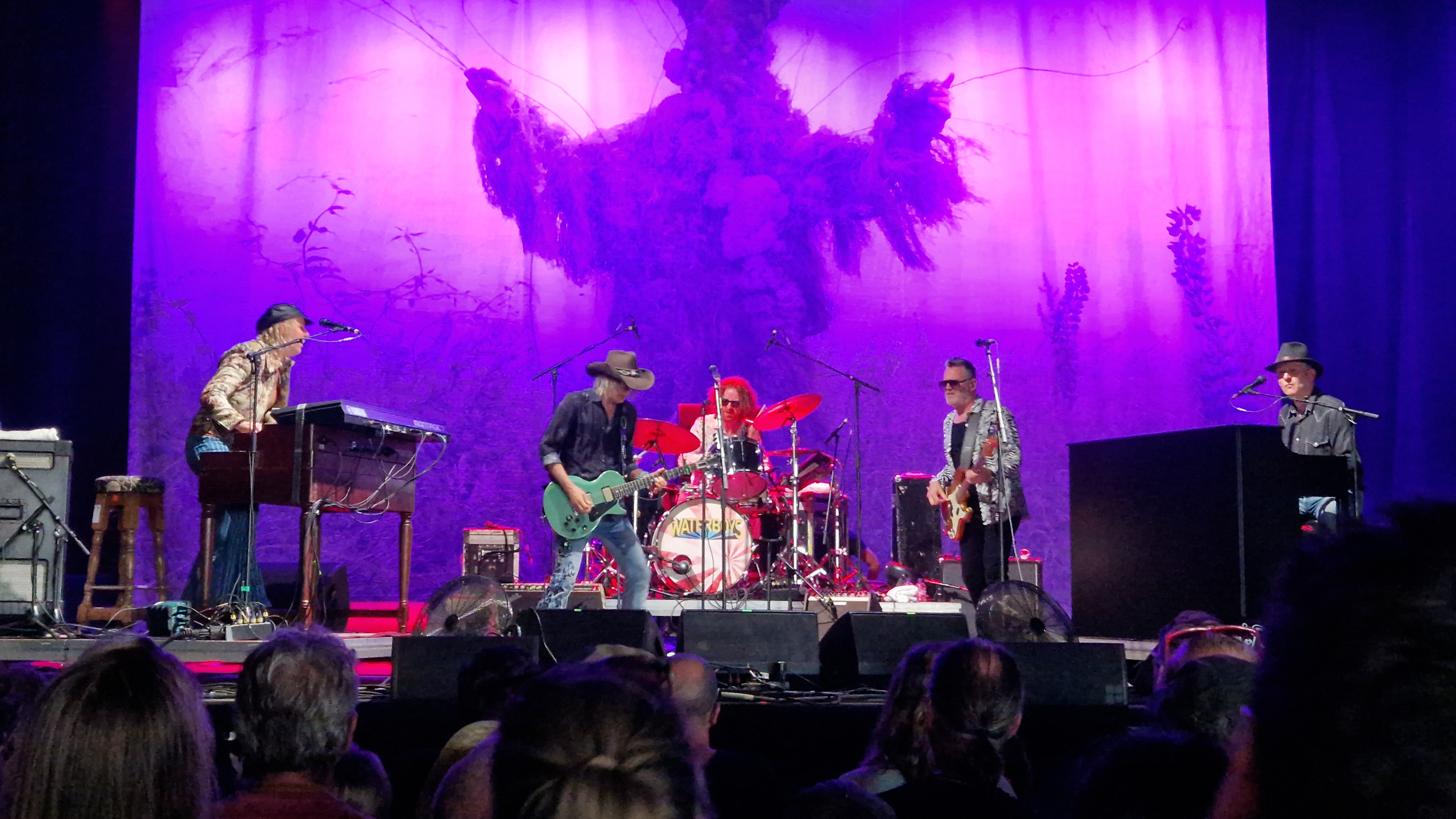
- The Waterboys performing at Rock Zottegem in 2023. L–R: "Brother" Paul Brown, Mike Scott, Eamon Ferris, Aongus Ralston and James Hallawell

Background information
- Origin: London, England, United Kingdom
- Genres: Rock; folk rock; Celtic; folk; post-punk (early)
- Years active: 1983–1993, 1998–present
- Members: Mike Scott; James Hallawell; "Brother" Paul Brown; Aongus Ralston; Eamon Ferris
- Past members: List of Waterboys members

The Waterboys are a rock band formed in 1983 in London by Scottish musician and songwriter Mike Scott. The band's membership, past and present, has been composed mainly of musicians from Britain and Ireland, with Scott being the only constant member. Over a four-decade career, the band has drawn on multiple styles of music including punk rock, rock and roll, folk music (in particular Irish and Scottish music), Celtic soul, noise rock, country music, rhythm & blues and chamber music.

Having originally dissolved in 1993 (when Scott departed to pursue a solo career), the group reformed in 2000, and continue to release albums and to tour worldwide. Scott emphasises a continuity between the Waterboys and his solo work, saying that "To me there's no difference between Mike Scott and the Waterboys; they both mean the same thing. They mean myself and whoever are my current travelling musical companions."

The early Waterboys sound became known as "The Big Music" after a song on their second album, A Pagan Place. This style was described by Scott as "a metaphor for seeing God's signature in the world." Waterboys chronicler Ian Abrahams elaborated on this by defining "The Big Music" as "...a mystical celebration of paganism. It's extolling the basic and primitive divinity that exists in everything ('the oceans and the sand'), religious and spiritual all encompassing. Here is something that can't be owned or built upon, something that has its existence in the concept of Mother Earth and has an ancestral approach to religion. And it takes in and embraces the feminine side of divinity, pluralistic in its acceptance of the wider pantheon of paganism."

"The Big Music" was used to describe other bands specializing in an anthemic sound, including U2, Simple Minds, In Tua Nua, Big Country and Hothouse Flowers. In the late 1980s, the band became significantly more folk-influenced. The Waterboys eventually returned to rock and roll, and have released both rock and folk albums since reforming.

== History ==
The Waterboys have gone through four distinct phases. Their early years, or "Big Music" period was followed by a folk music period which was characterised by an emphasis on touring over album production and by a large band membership, leading to the description of the group as a "Raggle Taggle band". After the release of a mainstream rock and roll album with Dream Harder, the band dissolved until they reunited in 2000. In the years since, they have revisited both rock and folk music, and continue to tour and release studio albums.

=== Formation ===
Scott, the Edinburgh-born son of a college lecturer, is the founder and only permanent member of the Waterboys. Having begun his career in teenage Ayr punk band White Heat and its Edinburgh successor Another Pretty Face, he moved to London and formed another short-lived band, The Red and the Black. This latter band included saxophone player Anthony Thistlethwaite, whom Scott had included after hearing him play on Waiting on Egypt, a Nikki Sudden album. The Red and the Black performed nine concerts in London, during which Thistlethwaite introduced Scott to drummer Kevin Wilkinson (previously with Stadium Dogs, Barry Andrews side-project Restaurants for Dogs and the League of Gentlemen), who also joined the band. During 1982, Scott made a number of recordings, both solo and with Thistlethwaite and Wilkinson. These sessions, recorded at Redshop Studio in Islington during late 1981 and early 1982, are the earliest recordings that would be released under the Waterboys' name and would later be divided between the Waterboys' first and second albums.

In 1983, even though Scott had signed to Ensign Records as a solo act, he decided to start a new band. He chose the Waterboys as its name, from a line in the Lou Reed song "The Kids" on the album Berlin. In March 1983, Ensign released the first recording under the new band name, a single titled "A Girl Called Johnny", the A-side of which was a tribute to Patti Smith. This was followed in May by the Waterboys' first performance as a group, on the BBC's Old Grey Whistle Test. The BBC performance included a new member, keyboard player Karl Wallinger (a multi-instrumentalist and Beatles fanatic who'd previously been in the pre-Alarm band Quasimodo as well as having spent a spell as musical director for The Rocky Horror Show; Wallinger would go on to lead World Party).

The Waterboys released their self-titled debut, The Waterboys, in July 1983. Their music, influenced by Patti Smith, Bob Dylan and David Bowie, was compared by critics to Van Morrison and U2 in its cinematic sweep. The band's earlier sound was described as a new wave and post-punk.

=== Early years: the Big Music ===
Cover for the single of "The Big Music", whose title song would define the Waterboys' early sound. The cover depicts members Scott, Thistlethwaite and Wilkinson.

After the release of their debut, the Waterboys began touring. Their first show was at the Batschkapp Club in Frankfurt in February 1984. The band then consisted of Mike Scott on vocals and guitar, Anthony Thistlethwaite on saxophone and mandolin, Wallinger on keyboards, Roddy Lorimer on trumpets, Martyn Swain on bass and Kevin Wilkinson on drums. John Caldwell (from Another Pretty Face) also played guitar, and Scottish singer Eddi Reader sang backing vocals for the band's first two concerts.

In late 1983 and early 1984, the band made some new recordings and over-dubbed old material, all of which was released as the Waterboys' second album, A Pagan Place, in June 1984. The "official" Waterboys line-up at this time, according to the sleeve of A Pagan Place, was Scott, Thistlethwaite, Wallinger and Wilkinson, with guest contributions from Reader, Lorimer and many others. The release of the album was followed by further touring in the UK, Europe and US including support for The Pretenders and U2 and a show at the Glastonbury Festival.

A Pagan Place was preceded by the single "The Big Music". The name of the single's A-side track was adopted by some commentators as a description of the Waterboys' sound, and is still used to refer to the musical style of their first three albums, which were built up by Scott from hard-panned multiple twelve-string rhythm guitars, rolling piano and judicious use of reverb to form "a shimmering wall of music" and added to by saxophone, occasional violins or trumpets, plus Wallinger's increasing breadth of instrumentation (which now included synth bass, various other orchestral synthesizer experiments and percussion).

Although Wilkinson left the Waterboys to concentrate on his other project, China Crisis, the band began to record new material in early 1985 for a new album. Late in the sessions, future Waterboy Steve Wickham added his violin to the track "The Pan Within"; he had been invited after Scott had heard him on a Sinéad O'Connor demo recorded at Karl Wallinger's house. The Waterboys (officially a trio of Scott, Thistlethwaite and Wallinger, with a slew of guests) released their third album, This Is the Sea, in October 1985. It sold better than either of the two earlier albums, and managed to get into the Top Forty. A single from it, "The Whole of the Moon", reached number 26 in the UK Singles Chart. Promotion efforts were hampered by Scott's refusal to perform on Top of the Pops, which insisted that its performers lip sync. The album release was followed by successful tours of the UK and North America, with Wickham becoming a full-time member, Marco Sin replacing Martyn Swain on bass, and Chris Whitten replacing Kevin Wilkinson on drums.

Wallinger (a budding songwriter and producer in his own right, who'd co-produced and arranged much of the initial album sessions, including "The Whole of the Moon"), was by now chafing under Scott's leadership and songwriting dominance. During the American tour, he announced his departure and subsequently left to form his own successful solo project (later band) World Party. Roddy Lorimer rejoined the band on subsequent tour dates to widen the sound. Wallinger was later replaced as keyboard player by Guy Chambers (who'd later become Robbie Williams's songwriting partner), and at the same time, former Ruts drummer Dave Ruffy replaced Chris Whitten. Sin left the Waterboys towards the end of the next European tour, following a heroin overdose, with Thistlethwaite covering for him on bass for the last few concert dates.

=== 1986–1988: The Raggle Taggle band and Fisherman's Blues ===
Having become discouraged by the stadium rock career path he was now being expected to follow (and frustrated by his inability to recreate the Waterboys' expansive studio sound in a live rock setting), Scott was now becoming interested in American roots music, (country, gospel, cajun and blues), something in which he was enthusiastically supported by Thistlethwaite and Wickham. At Wickham's invitation, Scott moved to Dublin where he could pursue these ideas at a remove from the music industry and in a more congenial musical climate. The band's line-up changed once again with Scott, Wickham and Thistlethwaite (the latter now focussing at least as much on mandolin as on saxophone) now joined by Trevor Hutchinson on bass and a succession of drummers, starting with Peter McKinney.

The new band, which the official Waterboys' website refers to as the "Raggle Taggle band" line-up, spent 1986 recording in Dublin and touring the UK, Ireland, Europe and Israel with a lineup of Scott, Wickham, Thistlethwaite, Hutchinson and a returning Dave Ruffy. In late November 1986, Scott, Thistlethwaite and Wickham (minus Hutchinson) spent a week in California recording roots and roots-inspired music with producer Bob Johnston and various American session players. McKinney was back on drums for live dates in early 1987, but had been replaced by Fran Been by summer 1987 in a Waterboys lineup which now included Uilleann piper Vinnie Kilduff and which played a free date on the Greenpeace vessel Sirius in Dublin harbour. Another former Waterboy, trumpeter Roddie Lorimer, briefly rejoined for a performance at the Pictish Festival in Letham, Scotland. Some of the performances from this era were released in 1998 on The Live Adventures of the Waterboys, including a famous Glastonbury performance in 1986.

In late 1987 Scott temporarily relocated to Spiddal in Galway in the west of Ireland, resulting in a deeper immersion in Irish music and culture. In early 1988 he brought the band there, where they set up a recording studio in Spiddal House to finish recording their new album. Patti Smith Group drummer Jay Dee Daugherty was briefly a member of the band for the Spiddal sessions, which featured the Scott, Wickham, Thistlethwaite and Hutchinson core augmented by visiting West Coast Irish folk musicians.

Fisherman's Blues was released in October 1988, finally pulling together various tracks from the vast stockpile recorded in Dublin and Spiddal over the previous three years and showcasing many of the guest musicians and temporary members that had played with the band during that time. It also illustrated the Waterboys' three-year journey through roots, country, gospel, blues and Irish/Scottish traditional music. Critics and fans were split between those embracing the new folk influences and others disappointed after hoping for a continuation of the style of This Is the Sea. World Music: The Rough Guide notes that "some cynics claim that Scotsman Mike Scott gave Irish music back to the Irish... his impact can't be underestimated", but Scott himself explains that it was the Irish tradition that influenced him; "I was in love with Ireland. Every day was a new adventure, it was mythical... Being part of a brotherhood of musicians was a great thing in those days, with all the many musicians of all stripes we befriended in Ireland. I still have that connection to the Irish musicians and tap into it..."

Owing to the large number of tracks that were recorded in the three years between This Is the Sea and Fisherman's Blues, the Waterboys released a second album of songs from this period in 2001, titled Too Close to Heaven (or Fisherman's Blues, Part 2 in North America), and more material was released as bonus tracks for the 2006 reissue of the remastered Fisherman's Blues album.

=== 1989–1990: The Magnificent Seven and Room to Roam ===
The Waterboys toured to support Fisherman's Blues with a lineup of Scott, Wickham, Thistlethwaite, Hutchinson, Daugherty, Kilduff, Lorimer and two other musicians who'd contributed to the album – whistle/flute/piano player Colin Blakey (a traditionally-minded member of Scottish folk-punk band We Free Kings) and veteran Irish Sean-nós singer Tomás Mac Eoin. By summer 1989 the lineup of the band had changed yet again, with Kilduff, Mac Eoin and Lorimer departing and Daugherty being replaced by Dublin drummer Noel Bridgeman (another contributor to Fisherman's Blues). Scott had also recruited teenage accordionist Sharon Shannon, already a rising Irish folk star, as part of his developing plan to bring "the marriage of rock'n'roll and trad" into the band. Scott referred to this new line-up as "the Magnificent Seven" and "the high summer of the Celtic Waterboys".

After further touring, the band returned to Spiddal to record a new album produced by Barry Beckett. Scott's initial concept was "(a) dream of merging trad and pop in a rootsy Sgt Pepper" but as recording progressed he realised that the production process exposed flaws within the band and compromises in the music, which began to slowly unravel both the existing line-up and the Waterboys' Celtic focus. The resulting album, Room to Roam was released in September 1990 and met with to mixed-to-poor reviews, further dampening Scott's enthusiasm for his current course.

The "Magnificent Seven" lineup disintegrated just before the release of Room to Roam, during tour rehearsals: Scott and Thistlethwaite had opted to fire Noel Bridgeman and replace him with a "tougher" drummer. Wickham, already discouraged, disagreed and chose to leave the band. Louisianan drummer Ken Blevins, a more rock-oriented musician, was recruited to replace Bridgeman, but it became evident that the Room to Roam music didn't work without a fiddle in the band, and Shannon and Blakey were asked to leave. With Blivens on drums, Scott, Thistlethwaite and Hutchinson fulfilled the group's tour dates. Unable to play the folk-and-roots material of the past five years, the Waterboys doggedly re-embraced a rock sound and reverted to sets drawn from their first three albums, brand new songs written post-Room to Roam and Dylan covers.

=== 1991–1993: Dream Harder and the end of the Waterboys ===
During 1991, the Waterboys continued to go through major changes. Discouraged by the collapse of his Celtic music adventure, and by the disintegration of the musical family which had surrounded the Raggle Taggle Band and the Magnificent Seven – and determined to be playing rock music again – Scott left Dublin and moved to New York, while Trevor Hutchinson left the band altogether to become a trad folk musician. Although the band was in pieces, a re-released issue of their 1985 single "The Whole of the Moon" (which had gained a new lease of life on the dance and rave scenes as a comedown track) reached number three in the UK Singles Chart, prompting the release of a compilation album, The Best of The Waterboys 81–90, which in turn reached number two in the UK Albums Chart as well as fulfilling the band's contract with Chrysalis Records. This success put the band in a good position for signing a new contract, and they duly signed to Geffen Records.

In America, Scott immersed himself in live music in New York and Chicago, wrote new songs and auditioned potential new Waterboys (including, for the first time, lead guitarists). Regretfully concluding that there was "no place" in the new songs and style for Anthony Thistlethwaite, he parted company with his longest-surviving bandmate in December 1991. Now the only remaining Waterboy, Scott recruited drummer Carla Azar and bass player Charley Drayton (the latter soon replaced by former Zappa band member Scott Thunes) to record the next Waterboys album Dream Harder, along with guitarist Chris Bruce and assorted session musicians.

Dream Harder was released in May 1993 and saw the band embracing a new hard rock-influenced sound. Although the album produced two UK Top 30 singles "The Return of Pan" and "Glastonbury Song", Scott had become frustrated, still feeling discouraged by the disappointing end of his Celtic phase and feeling that Dream Harder had captured him at "half power" despite his efforts. Frustrated by not being able to get a new touring Waterboys band together, Scott decided to make further changes. He abandoned the "Waterboys" name, left New York and moved to northeast Scotland for the first of several stays at the Findhorn Foundation, exploring the esoteric spiritual ideas which he'd first encountered in London bookstores during the early 1980s.

=== 1994–2000: Mike Scott solo, and the Waterboys return with A Rock in the Weary Land ===
In 1994, having divided the intervening time between Dublin and the Findhorn Foundation, Scott returned to London and embarked on a solo career which produced two albums – the almost wholly acoustic Bring 'Em All In (1995) and the rock-and-soul-inspired Still Burning (1995). Although Scott himself was happy with both records, neither performed well commercially, resulting in the end of his Geffen contract. In 1998, Scott performed a solo show at the Galway Arts Festival, at which he reunited on stage with Steve Wickham and Anthony Thistlethwaite for the encore. In October 1999, Scott and Wickham reunited for a full gig in Sligo.

Also during 1999, Scott began re-establishing his musical direction, "bringing (him)self up to speed with rock'n'roll" and basing his new sound on a "psychedelic elemental roar" aided by assorted effects pedals, an Electro-Harmonix MicroSynth, a blues harmonica microphone, harmoniums, a Hindu beat box and a Theremin. The result, released at the end of September 2000, was a new album called A Rock in the Weary Land, for which Scott resurrected the Waterboys name (citing its recognition amongst fans). The album had a new, experimental rock sound inspired by contemporary bands Radiohead and Beck and described by Scott as "sonic rock". As well as new Scott associates such as Thighpaulsandra and Gilad Atzmon, a number of old Waterboys guested on the album: Anthony Thistlethwaite, Kevin Wilkinson and Dave Ruffy. (This would be one of Wilkinson's final appearances on record, due to his death by suicide on 17 July 1999, aged 41.)

By the summer of 2000, Scott had assembled a new Waterboys lineup – himself on voice and guitar, Richard Naiff on keyboards and organs, bass player Livingston Brown and drummer Jeremy Stacey. Wickham guested on fiddle at live dates in Dublin and Belfast on the resulting tour of late 2000, and rejoined the band permanently in January 2001.

=== 2003–2013: Universal Hall, Book of Lightning, An Appointment with Mr Yeats ===
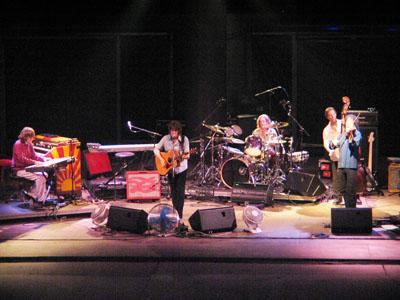
The Waterboys in Antwerp, 2003.

Scott, Wickham and Naiff were the core of the Waterboys by 2003, when the group changed direction once again and released Universal Hall, a mostly acoustic album with a return of some Celtic influences from the Fisherman's Blues era as well as aspects of New Age music and dance electronica. The album was followed by a tour of the UK and then Europe. Their first official live album, Karma to Burn, was released in 2005 – with Carlos Hercules on drums, Steve Walters on bass and a guest appearance by Sharon Shannon on accordion – showing off the band's acoustic and electric sides.

A new studio album, Book of Lightning (which revived some of the noisy psychedelic rock aspects of A Rock in the Weary Land), was released 2 April 2007 with yet another lineup. Scott, Naiff and Wickham were joined in the studio by Leo Abrahams (lead guitar), bass player Mark Smith and drummer Brian Blade, while further contributions were made by further former Waterboys from various recording and touring bands (Jeremy Stacey, Roddy Lorimer, Chris Bruce and Thighpaulsandra). This line-up came up to an end over the course of 2009 – Richard Naiff left in February to spend more time with his family, while Smith died suddenly and unexpectedly in November 2009 at the age of forty-nine, leaving Scott and Wickham as the band core.

In 2010, having harboured the idea for 20 years, Mike Scott set twenty W. B. Yeats poems to music in an enterprise that evolved into a show entitled An Appointment With Mr. Yeats. The Waterboys held the show's world premiere from 15 to 20 March 2010 in Yeats's own theatre, the Abbey Theatre, Dublin. The five-night show quickly sold out, later receiving several rave reviews, among which were The Irish Times and Irish actor/playwright Michael Harding. Some of the poems performed included "The Hosting of the Sidhe", "The Lake Isle of Innisfree", "News for the Delphic Oracle", and 'The Song of Wandering Aengus', along with an amalgamation of two Yeats lyrics that became the song 'Let the Earth Bear Witness' which Scott had produced during 'The Sea of Green' 2009 Iranian election protests. The musical arrangements for the poems were varied and experimental. On the band's website Scott described the arrangements as "psychedelic, intense, kaleidescopic, a mix of rock, folk and faery music", the delivery of which signalled yet another musical shift in the ever-mutable world of the Waterboys.

An Appointment With Mr. Yeats returned to Dublin on 7 November 2010 in the city's Grand Canal Theatre. The show was performed at the Barbican Hall, London in February 2011. The album version of An Appointment With Mr. Yeats was released on 19 September 2011 and reached the UK Top 30. The band line-up for this album centred on Scott, Wickham and the new Waterboys members James Hellawell (keyboards), Marc Arciero (bass) and Ralph Salmins (drums), joined by guests including oboist Kate St. John and Irish folk singer Katie Kim.

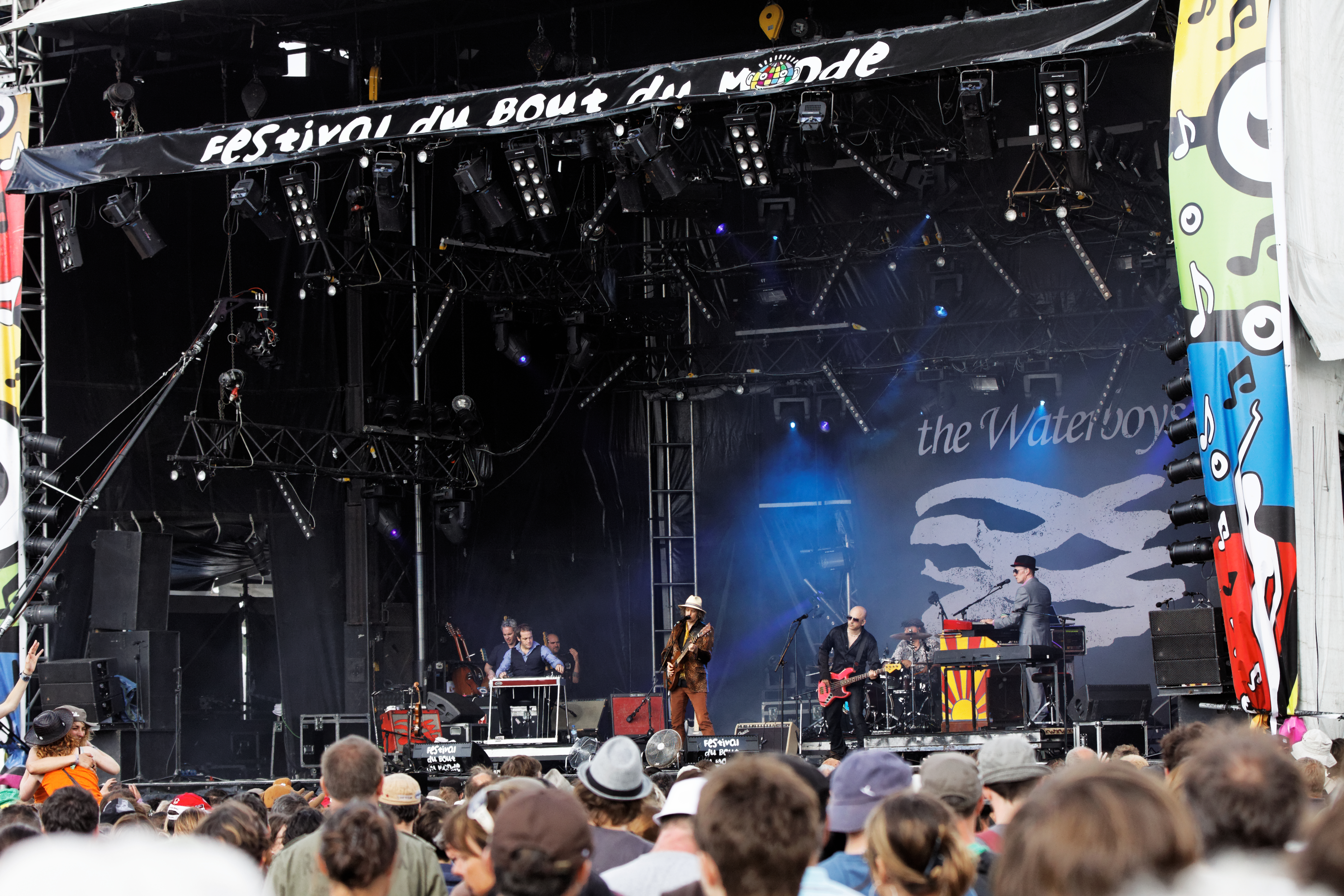
The Waterboys at Festival du Bout du Monde, 2012

In 2011, the Waterboys released further archive recordings in the shape of In a Special Place – The Piano Demos for This Is the Sea. In 2013, they released the entire set of recordings from the three-year Fisherman's Blues sessions as a six-CD box set called Fisherman's Box.

=== 2014–2021: Modern Blues, Out of All This Blue, Where the Action Is & Good Luck Seeker (soul, funk and beats) ===
Ralph Salmins remained with Scott and Wickham for the band's next album, Modern Blues, which was first announced in October 2014 and released on 19 January 2015 in the United Kingdom (7 April in North America). Inspired mostly by soul and blues, the album was recorded in Nashville, and produced by Mike Scott and mixed by Bob Clearmountain. The line up introduced another new Waterboys keyboard player, "Brother" Paul Brown (replacing Hallawell), while bass was provided by veteran Muscle Shoals bass player David Hood. The record featured other country/rhythm-and-blues musicians including Zach Ernst, Don Bryant and Phil Madeira. The first UK single from the Modern Blues album was 'November Tale'.

Modern Blues was followed in 2017 by a double studio album, Out of All This Blue, which built on the soul and blues of its predecessor while adding more funk and contemporary dance rhythms, and was released on 8 September by BMG Records. Scott described it as "two-thirds love and romance, one-third stories and observations.... the songs just kept coming, and in pop colours." The first single from the album was "If The Answer Is Yeah", released in July.

Aongus Ralston had joined as permanent Waterboys bass player in 2016 and participated in the recording for the next studio album, Where the Action Is, which was announced in March 2019 and released on 24 May by Cooking Vinyl. It continued the Waterboys ongoing love affair with soul, blues and funk while also experimenting with hip hop. The first UK single from the album was 'Right Side Of Heartbreak (Wrong Side Of Love)', released on 14 March. On 21 May 2019, the band shared the music video for the third single off the record, "Ladbroke Grove Symphony": a tribute to the former bohemian heart of West London in which Mike Scott invoked his time living and writing among the crumbling, seaside-esque streets of Notting Hill during the 1980s. The accompanying montage video captured the magic of the Grove in all its weird and wonderful counterculture, and featured new film and vintage photography of Scott as he told the story of the song.

The band's fourteenth studio album Good Luck, Seeker was released on 21 August 2020, continuing the band's contemporary American roots explorations while also re-engaging with some of their Irish folk interests and with the spoken word. The first song to be previewed from the album was "My Wanderings in the Weary Land" on 5 June. The single "The Soul Singer" was released on 15 July.

Eamon Ferris joined as the new Waterboys drummer during 2021. The band's former drummer, Noel Bridgeman, died on 23 March 2021 aged seventy-four. On 3 December 2021, the Waterboys released another box set, The Magnificent Seven, containing archive live, studio and session recordings of the 1989–1990 Room to Roam band featuring Scott, Wickham, Bridgeman, Anthony Thistlethwaite, Trevor Hutchinson, Sharon Shannon and Colin Blakey.

=== 2022–present: All Souls Hill, Life, Death and Dennis Hopper. & partial return to Irish sounds ===
Steve Wickham was absent from the band's fifteenth studio album, All Souls Hill, which was initiated during the Covid lockdown period of 2020, and featured extensive collaborations between Mike Scott (in his home studio) and a new collaborator – composer/producer/frequent Paul Weller collaborator Simon Dine. While still utilising the hip-hop/electric roots music approach of the previous three Waterboys albums, it also went deeper into the Irish folk and poetry aspects of the band's late '80s/early '90s phase. It was released by Cooking Vinyl on 6 May 2022.

The Waterboys announced Steve Wickham's second formal departure from the band on 14 February 2022. Having realised that he was now more connected with the band's "legacy" music rather than the creation of its new material, Wickham opted to step down from regular involvement to focus on his own music and other projects. Both Wickham and other band members stated that he would remain "part of the Waterboys family" and return for other Waterboys projects in the future. Another longstanding Waterboys family member, Anthony Thistlethwaite, briefly rejoined the band for festival dates in July and August 2022.

In April, 2025, the Waterboys released an LP titled Life, Death and Dennis Hopper, a concept album about the late actor. As well as a cameo appearance from Wickham, the album featured collaborations with, or guest appearances from, Steve Earle, Bruce Springsteen, Fiona Apple, Anana Kaye, Taylor Goldsmith of Dawes, Norwegian country band Sugarfoot and British singer-songwriter Barny Fletcher. It also featured a fluid approach to band identity, in which Scott worked with varying line-ups of the current Waterboys ensemble and friends, and chose to co-write with assorted bandmembers plus producers and outside collaborators including Simon Dine and Benjamin Talbott. The album spawned a 48-minute documentary (A Wild and Beautiful Ride), and was supported by a tour later in the year, with Barny Fletcher joining the band on extra vocals.

In November 2025, the Waterboys announced a "Fisherman's Blues Revue Tour" scheduled for August and September 2026, focussing on the Fisherman's Blues music of the mid-to-late 1980s. Steve Wickham is scheduled to return to the band for this particular tour, which will feature an eight=piece line-up of Scott, Wickham, Hellawell, Brown, Ralston, Ferris and new additions Roar Øien (pedal steel guitar) and Steve Earle (vocals, guitar and mandolin), with certain Earle songs being added to the setlist in what Scott describes as a desire to add "Americana roots and killer songs." At the same time, Scott announced the forthcoming release of another archive set, Atlantic Rain, a three-disc set of "previously undiscovered" music from the Fisherman's Blues sessions, due on 17 July 2026 on Chrysalis Records, with Scott commenting "we made so much music during those days - hundreds and hundreds of individual recordings - that I'm still discovering magical stuff in the vaults. This set contains the best I've found so far - the music is every bit as good as the original album."

== Music ==
The Waterboys' lyrics and arrangements reflect Scott's current interests and influences, the latter including the musical sensibilities of other members. Wickham in particular had a tremendous impact on the band's sound after joining the group. In terms of arrangement and instrumentation, rock and roll and Celtic folk music have played the largest roles in the band's sound. Literature and spirituality have played an important role in Scott's lyrics. Other contributing factors include women and love, punk music's DIY ethic, the British poetic tradition, and Scott's experiences at Findhorn, where he lived for some years.

=== Sound ===
The Waterboys' music can be divided into four distinct styles. The first is represented by the first three albums, released between 1983 and 1985. The band's arrangements during this period, described by Allmusic as a "rich, dramatic sound... majestic", and typically referred to as "The Big Music", combined the rock and roll sound of early U2 with elements of classical trumpet (Lorimer), jazz saxophone (Thistlethwaite) and contemporary keyboards (Wallinger). Scott emphasised the arrangement's fullness by using production techniques similar to Phil Spector's "Wall of Sound". The archetypal example, the song "The Big Music", gave the style its name, but the best-selling example was "The Whole of the Moon", the song that the early 1980s Waterboys are best known for and that demonstrates both Wallinger's synthpop keyboard effects and the effectiveness of the brass section of the band.

The Whole of the Moon
The album version of "The Whole of the Moon" demonstrates the sound of The Big Music period.

After Wickham's joining and the move to Ireland, the band went three years before releasing another album. Fisherman's Blues, and more particularly Room to Roam, traded "The Big Music"'s keyboards and brass for traditional instruments such as tin whistle, flute, fiddle, accordion, harmonica, and bouzouki. Celtic folk music replaced rock as the main inspiration for song arrangements on both albums. Rolling Stone describes the sound as "an impressive mixture of rock music and Celtic ruralism..., Beatles and Donovan echoes and, of course, lots of grand guitar, fiddle, mandolin, whistle, flute and accordion playing". Traditional folk songs were recorded along with those written by Scott. "The Raggle Taggle Gypsy", a British folk ballad at least two hundred years old, was recorded on Room to Roam. It became closely associated with the band, much as the song "The Big Music" did, and also gave its name to describe the band's character. The recording emphasises how distinctly different the band's music had become in the five years since the last of "The Big Music" albums.

The Raggle Taggle Gypsy
The Waterboys' Room to Roam version of the folk song "The Raggle Taggle Gypsy".

After the break-up of the "Raggle Taggle band", Scott used the Waterboys' name for Dream Harder and A Rock in the Weary Land. These two albums, separated by seven years and bookending Scott's solo album releases, were both rock albums but with distinctive approaches to that genre. Dream Harder was described as "disappointingly mainstream", whereas the sound of the A Rock in the Weary Land was inspired by alternative music and was praised by critics. For 2003's Universal Hall, however, Wickham had once again rejoined the band, and that album saw a return of the acoustic folk instrumentation of the late 1980s Waterboys, with the exception of the song "Seek the Light", which is instead an idiosyncratic EBM track.

Since 2014, the Waterboys have embraced a style drawing from contemporary American blues, rock, soul, funk and hip-hop, while at points revisiting aspects of their Irish folk influences.

=== Literary influences ===
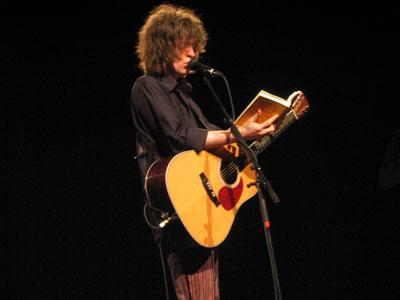
Scott reads aloud from Hafez' The Gift at a Waterboys concert in Antwerp in 2004. Waterboys' concerts often feature readings from the Sufi poet's work.

Scott, who briefly studied literature and philosophy at the University of Edinburgh, has made heavy use of English literature in his music. The Waterboys have recorded poems set to music by writers including William Butler Yeats ("The Stolen Child" and "Love and Death"), George MacDonald ("Room to Roam"), and Robert Burns ("Ever to Be Near Ye"). A member of the Academy of American Poets writes that "the Waterboys' gift lies in locating Burns and Yeats within a poetic tradition of song, revelry, and celebration, re-invigorating their verses with the energy of contemporary music". So close is the identification of the Waterboys with their literary influences that the writer also remarks that "W.B.", the initials to which Yeats' first and middle names are often shortened, could also stand for "Waterboys". The Waterboys returned to W.B. Yeats in March 2010. Having arranged 20 of his poems to music, the band performed them as An Appointment With Mr Yeats for five nights at the Abbey Theatre, Dublin (which Yeats co-founded in 1904). The liner notes from the CD edition of Room to Roam acknowledge author C.S. Lewis as an influence, and the title of the song "Further Up, Further In" is taken from a line in his novel The Last Battle.

Scott has also a number of poetic tropes in lyrics, including anthropomorphism (e.g. "Islandman"), metaphor (e.g. "A Church Not Made with Hands", "The Whole of the Moon"), and metonymy (e.g. "Old England"). The latter song quotes from both Yeats and James Joyce. While the lyrics of the band have explored a large number of themes, symbolic references to water are especially prominent. Water is often referenced in their songs (e.g. "This Is the Sea", "Strange Boat", "The Stolen Child", "Fisherman's Blues"). The Waterboys' logo, first seen on the album cover of The Waterboys, symbolises waves.

=== Spirituality ===
The Waterboys' lyrics show influences from different spiritual traditions. The first is the romantic Neopaganism and esotericism of authors such as Yeats and Dion Fortune, which can be observed in the repeated references to the ancient Greek deity Pan in both "The Pan Within" and "The Return of Pan". Pan was also featured on the album art for Room to Roam. "Medicine Bow", a song from the recording sessions for This Is the Sea, refers to Native American spirituality in its use of the word "medicine" to mean spiritual power. Scott's interest in Native American issues is also demonstrated in his preliminary recordings for the group's debut album, which included the songs "Death Song of the Sioux Parts One & Two" and "Bury My Heart". "Bury My Heart" is a reference to Dee Brown's Bury My Heart at Wounded Knee. a history of Native Americans in the western United States. Scott took the traditional Sioux song "The Earth Only Endures" from Bury My Heart at Wounded Knee, and set it to new music; the arrangement appears on The Secret Life of the Waterboys. Christian imagery can be seen in the songs "December" from The Waterboys, "The Christ in You" on Universal Hall, and indirectly in the influence of C. S. Lewis in a number of other songs, but Scott writes that his lyrics are not influenced by Christianity.

Scott has also said, "I've always been interested in spirituality, and I've never joined any religion. And it really turns me off when people from one religion say theirs is the only way. And I believe all religions are just different ways to spirituality. And if you call that universality, well, then I'm all for it." Despite Scott's pluralist perspective, the Waterboys have been labelled as "Christian rock" by some reviewers and heathens by some Christians.

== Members ==
Over 70 musicians have performed live as a Waterboy. Some have spent only a short time with the band, contributing to a single tour or album, while others have been long-term members with significant contributions. Scott has been the band's lead vocalist, motivating force, and principal songwriter throughout the group's history, but a number of other musicians are closely identified with the band.

Scott has stated that "We've had more members I believe than any other band in rock history" and believes that the nearest challengers are Santana and the Fall.

=== Current members ===
- Mike Scott – vocals, guitar, piano, keyboards (1981–94, 1998–present)
- James Hallawell – Hammond organ, keyboards, backing vocals (2010–13, 2021–present)
- Brother Paul Brown – keyboards, piano, backing vocals (2013–present)
- Aongus Ralston – bass, backing vocals (2016–present)
- Eamon Ferris – drums (2021–present)
- Roar Øien - pedal steel guitar (confirmed 2025, playing with band 2026)
- Steve Earle - guitar, mandolin, vocals (confirmed 2025, playing with band 2026)

== Discography ==
Studio albums

- The Waterboys (1983)
- A Pagan Place (1984)
- This Is the Sea (1985)
- Fisherman's Blues (1988)
- Room to Roam (1990)
- Dream Harder (1993)
- A Rock in the Weary Land (2000)
- Universal Hall (2003)
- Book of Lightning (2007)
- An Appointment with Mr Yeats (2011)
- Modern Blues (2015)
- Out of All This Blue (2017)
- Where the Action Is (2019)
- Good Luck, Seeker (2020)
- All Souls Hill (2022)
- Life, Death and Dennis Hopper (2025)

== General sources ==
- Scott, Mike (2017). Adventures of a Waterboy – Remastered. Jawbone Press. ISBN 978-1-911-03635-7.
