= Roddy Lorimer =

British musician

- Born: 19 May 1953 (age 72)
- Origin: Glasgow, Scotland
- Genres: Pop; jazz; rock; folk
- Occupation: Musician
- Instrument: Trumpet
- Years active: 1981–present
- Member of: Kick Horns
- Formerly of: Deep End

Roddy Lorimer (born 19 May 1953) is a Scottish musician who plays trumpet and flugelhorn. He has performed with Blur, Gene, the Rolling Stones, Draco Rosa, the Who, the Style Council, Eric Clapton, Suede, Supergrass, Beyoncé, Jamiroquai, Dr John, the Waterboys, Nik Kershaw, Bruce Foxton, Fish (of Marillion). He is a founding member of the horn section Kick Horns.

== Career ==
Lorimer studied the trumpet at the Royal Scottish Academy of Music and Drama in Glasgow.

Lorimer, as part of the Kick Horns, toured North America and the UK with the Who in 1989. World tours with Eric Clapton in 1993–96 and later a European tour for six months with the Clapton Band in 2006. He was a member of Pete Townshend's 'Deep End' (1985), a short-lived supergroup founded by Townshend featuring Pink Floyd guitarist David Gilmour.

He toured through the 1980s and early 1990s with the Waterboys. Currently he is playing with Cotton Mouth, one of Bangkok, Thailand's best blues rock bands, and Rolling Stones tribute band Midnight Ramblers, also based in Bangkok.

== Select discography ==
- Baaba Maal - Firin' in Fouta, Nomad Soul
- The Beautiful South - Miaow, Quench
- Beyoncé – Green Light
- Eric Bibb - Natural Light
- Blur - Modern Life is Rubbish, Parklife, The Great Escape
- Boyzone – Picture of You
- China Crisis - Working with Fire and Steel, Flaunt the Imperfection
- Erasure – The Innocents
- Eric Clapton - From the Cradle, Back Home
- Deep Purple - In Concert with The London Symphony Orchestra
- Dodgy - Free Peace Sweet
- Dr John - Anutha Zone
- Gabrielle - Give Me a Little More Time
- David Gilmour – About Face
- David Gray - Life in Slow Motion
- Groove Armada - Vertigo
- Geri Halliwell - Schizophonic
- Jamiroquai - Synkronized
- Tom Jones - Reload, Carrying a Torch
- The Lightning Seeds - Sense
- Michael McDonald - Soul Speak
- Mr Bean - Elected
- The Pretenders - Human on the Inside
- Primal Scream - Screamadelica, Dixie-Narco
- Finley Quaye - Maverick a Strike, Vanguard
- Chris Rea - Auberge
- The Rolling Stones - Steel Wheels, Flashpoint
- S Club 7 - S Club, 7
- Jimmy Somerville - Read my Lips,Dare to Love
- The Spice Girls - Spiceworld
- Spiritualized - Lazer Guided Melodies, Pure Phase, Ladies and Gentlemen We Are Floating in Space
- Stereo MCs - Connected, Deep Down & Dirty
- Rod Stewart - A Spanner in the Works
- Supergrass - In It for the Money
- James Taylor Quartet - Theme from Starsky and Hutch
- Toploader - Onka's Big Moka
- Pete Townshend - White City: A Novel, Deep End Live!, Psychoderelict
- The Waterboys - A Pagan Place, This Is the Sea, Fisherman's Blues, Room to Roam, Book of Lightning
- Westernhagen - Jaja, Krieg, Affentheater, Keine Zeit
- Wham! - Fantastic
- The Who - Join Together

=== Others by country ===
- Germany – Die Fantastischen Vier, Udo Lindenberg, Nina Hagen, Extrabreit, Klaus Hoffmann
- France – Lio, John Jaques Goldman, Ettiene Daho, Carmel
- Spain - Danza Invisible
- Scotland - Nazareth, Fish, The Proclaimers, Danny Wilson, John Martyn.
- Ireland - The Pogues, Shane MacGowan
- Wales - Cerys Matthews
- England – The Levellers, Pele, The Pale Fountains, Bernie Marsden, Andy Fairweather Low, Bros, Dead or Alive, Mel C, Lighthouse Family, Hard-fi, Public Image Limited, Duran Duran, Kim Wilde, Bruce Foxton, Richard Ashcroft, The Style Council, Holly Johnson, The Communards, Mr Blobby
- Scandinavia – A-Ha, Ace of Base
- Australia – Kylie Minogue, The Sunny Boys
- Brazil – Robi Draco Rosa
- Japan – Nobohide Sake, Miss Honda
- Africa – Papa Wemba, Miryam Mursall
- USA – Rufus Wainwright, Jay Owens
