= A Girl Called Johnny =

Single by The Waterboys

from the album The Waterboys
- B-side: "The Late Train to Heaven"
- Released: March 1983
- Length: 3:41
- Label: Chicken Jazz
- Songwriter: Mike Scott
- Producer: Rupert Hine

The Waterboys singles chronology
"A Girl Called Johnny" (1983)	"December" (1983)

"A Girl Called Johnny" is a song by British band the Waterboys, released in 1983 as the lead single from their debut studio album The Waterboys. The song was written by Mike Scott and produced by Rupert Hine. It reached No. 80 in the UK Singles Chart and remained in the Top 100 for three weeks.

== Writing ==
"A Girl Called Johnny" was inspired by American singer-songwriter Patti Smith. Scott discovered Smith's musical work and poetry in 1976 and became a big fan, which led to him forming his own fanzine, Jungleland. In 1978, Scott was aware Smith was due to perform with her band at the Rainbow Theatre in London. He knew she always stayed at the Portobello Hotel and, after ringing the hotel, managed to speak to her over the phone. Smith suggested Scott come down from Scotland to see the show and write about it in his fanzine. He travelled down to London by train, and Smith provided him with a concert ticket, covered the expense of his hotel room, and placed him under the care of her guitarist, Lenny Kaye.

Speaking of the influence of Smith on the song, Scott told Colin Irwin of Melody Maker in 1983, "There is a line about a girl called Johnny in one of her songs called 'Redondo Beach', and I heard a tape and I noticed that Johnny is a hero or heroine on lots of her early songs. So I thought I'd make her Johnny because she vanished a few years ago ... it's a sort of postscript."

== Recording ==
"A Girl Called Johnny" was recorded at Farmyard Studios in May 1982. Although most of the early Waterboys' material was produced by Scott, this song was produced by Rupert Hine. Hine gave the song its Motown-inspired backbeat and saxophonist Anthony Thistlethwaite wrote his own sax lines.

== Critical reception ==
Following the single's release, Mike Gardner of Record Mirror commented, "This sounds like Madness taken seriously. There's the rolling piano and the wailing sax. It works until leadened lyrics shoot it down in flames. But it has a certain charm." Jim Whiteford of the Kilmarnock Standard described "A Girl Called Johnny" as "a good debut record worth attention". He noted the "same old rasping saxophone sound", but added that the song is made "distinctive" by its "tinkling honky-tonk piano" and Scott's voice. Robbi Millar of Sounds wrote, "Playing this single reveal[s] a level of genuine passionate emotion often missed from today's charts. Rolling in on a nostalgic keyboard base, it's messy and derivative in a what-the-hell manner, shrugging its shoulders and taking no advice."

In a review of The Waterboys, Ken Tucker of The Philadelphia Inquirer described "A Girl Called Johnny" as "a beautiful song, full of a romantic excessiveness that is endearing." Rick Shefchik of Knight-Ridder Newspapers noted the song's "jazz-blues piano figure that instantly sticks in the brain".

In a 1991 feature for the Sunday Independent, Barry Egan commented, "1982's 'A Girl Called Johnny', replete with Thistlewaite's heaven-storming saxophone break, was the first sign we received that a new star, a weird star, was soon to blaze in the firmament: Michael Scott." In a 2017 retrospective on the "best of Mike Scott", Tom Doyle of Q included "A Girl Called Johnny" as one of ten tracks on the list and described it as a "brilliant debut single with loping piano riff and lyric inspired by the attitude of Patti Smith".

== Cover versions ==
- In 1988, British singer Sandie Shaw released a version of the song on her seventh studio album Hello Angel.

== Formats ==
7" single
No.	Title	Length
1.	"A Girl Called Johnny"	3:41
2.	"The Late Train to Heaven"	3:34

12" single
No.	Title	Length
1.	"A Girl Called Johnny"	3:41
2.	"Ready for the Monkey House"	4:02
3.	"Somebody Might Wave Back"	2:51
4.	"Out of Control (*)"	4:02

(*) "Out of Control" was recorded by Another Pretty Face for a John Peel Radio One session

== Personnel ==
- Mike Scott – vocals, piano, electric guitar, percussion
- Anthony Thistlethwaite – saxophone, percussion
- Nick Linden – bass
- Kevin Wilkinson – drums
- Ray Massey, Rupert Hine – percussion on "A Girl Called Johnny"
- John Caldwell – guitar and violin on "Out of Control"
- Alan Mair – bass on "Out of Control"
- Adrian Johnston – drums on "Out of Control"

Production

- Rupert Hine – producer of "A Girl Called Johnny"
- Steven Tayler – engineer on "A Girl Called Johnny"
- Mike Scott – producer of "The Late Train to Heaven", "Ready for the Monkey House" and "Somebody Might Wave Back"
- Jim Preen – engineer on "The Late Train to Heaven", "Ready for the Monkey House" and "Somebody Might Wave Back"
- Chris Lycett – producer of "Out of Control"

Other

- Panny Charrington – photography

== Charts ==
Chart (1983)	Peak position
Netherlands (Single Top 100)	44
Netherlands (Tipparade)	12
UK Singles (Official Charts)	80
