= Mike Scott (Scottish musician) =

Scottish songwriter and musician (born 1958)

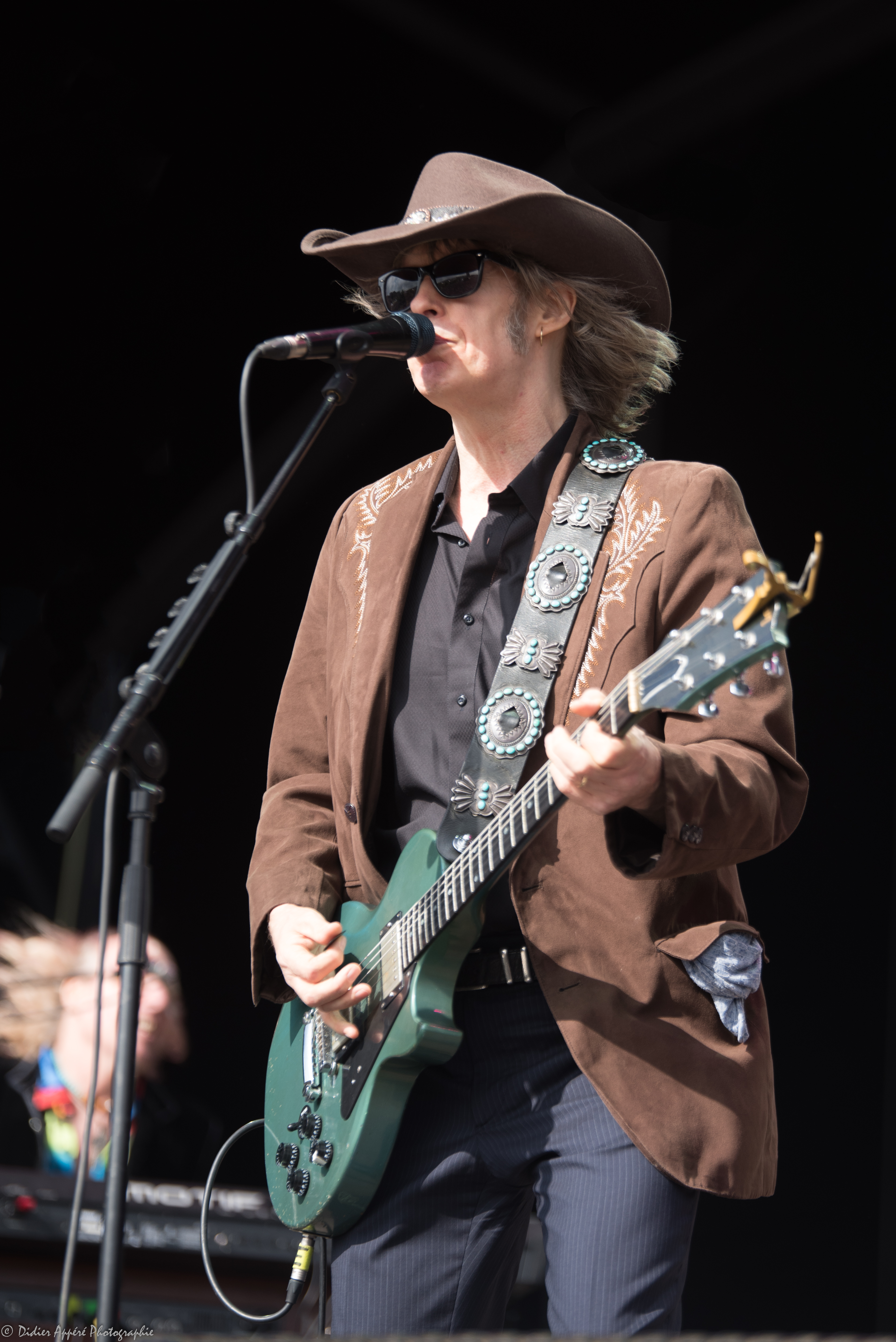
- Scott performing with the Waterboys in 2019

Background information
- Born: Michael Scott; 14 December 1958 (age 67); Edinburgh, Scotland
- Genres: Rock; folk
- Instruments: Vocals; guitar; piano; drums; Hammond organ; bouzouki
- Years active: 1978–present
- Label: Chrysalis
- Spouse: Megumi Igarashi

Michael Scott (born 14 December 1958) is a Scottish singer, songwriter, and musician. He is the founding member, lead singer, guitarist, songwriter and only constant member of rock band The Waterboys. He has also produced two solo albums, Bring 'Em All In and Still Burning. Scott is a vocalist, guitarist and pianist, and has played a large range of other instruments, including the bouzouki, drums, and Hammond organ on his albums. Scott is also a published writer, having released his autobiography, Adventures of a Waterboy, in 2012.

Having begun a musical career in the 1970s, Scott has been making music professionally since the 1980s and is well known for his radical changes in music genres throughout what he refers to as his "allegedly unorthodox" career. Scott lives in Dublin, Ireland.

== Early life and education ==
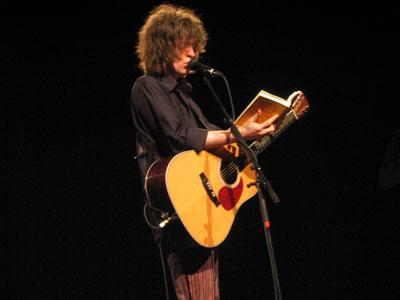
Mike Scott reads aloud at a concert in Antwerp in 2004.

Scott was born and raised in Edinburgh, the son of Allan and Anne Scott. His father left the family when Mike was ten years old, but the two were reunited in 2007. Scott's mother was an English teacher, exposing him to the greats of English literature from a young age.

Scott was interested in music from an early age. At age 12, after the family had moved to Ayr, he began a serious interest in learning guitar. Scott remembers that, "from the minute [he] bought" 'Last Night in Soho' by Dave Dee, Dozy, Beaky, Mick & Tich in 1968 "knew [he] had to be in music", and mentions listening to Hank Williams as a "life-changing" experience. The next year, Scott was playing in school bands and formed the band Karma, named after the tenet in Hinduism, with a friend named John Caldwell. Karma's sound was inspired by David Bowie, The Beatles and Bob Dylan.

In 1977 Scott entered the University of Edinburgh, studying English literature and philosophy. Scott would later arrange poetry from William Butler Yeats, Robert Burns, and George MacDonald for The Waterboys recordings. Other literary influences on Scott's career include C. S. Lewis and The Diary of Vikenty Angarov. Scott left the University of Edinburgh after his first year.

Scott became interested in the British punk music scene, and began writing for fanzines, eventually starting his own, Jungleland. Scott was especially interested in the music of The Clash and Patti Smith, a tribute to whom, "A Girl Called Johnny", would become the first Waterboys single.

== Career ==
=== Pre-Waterboys ===
Scott and a guitarist named Allan McConnell formed a band, The Bootlegs, which gave way to Another Pretty Face in 1978 when Caldwell and two other friends joined. The friends created their own record label, named New Pleasures, "obtained financial backing from the enigmatically named Z" and began releasing Another Pretty Face's singles. The band achieved some success with their first single "All the Boys Love Carrie" / "That's Not Enough" when New Musical Express named it "Single of the Week". The band signed a contract with Virgin Records, was featured on the cover of Sounds (magazine), and toured with Stiff Little Fingers. Virgin, after receiving a demo tape from Another Pretty Face, released the band four months after the signing. Nikki Sudden, who had interviewed Another Pretty Face in Edinburgh for ZigZag (magazine), asserts that "the APF stuff is still some of Mike Scott’s best work".

In 1980 through 1982 Scott, amongst other projects, worked occasionally with Sudden. Another Pretty Face continued to release music and recorded a Peel Session on 18 February 1981. The band eventually came to the attention of Nigel Grainge, founder of Ensign Records. Grainge signed Another Pretty Face to the label, and the band moved to London, changing its name to Funhouse (taken from the name of The Stooges' album Fun House). Scott had become dissatisfied with the band. He later described Funhouse's sound as "similar to a jumbo jet flying on one engine". Scott began working on solo songs and recordings, a decision that led to the creation of The Waterboys. A December 1981 session at Redshop Studios formed the beginnings of The Waterboys' first album, The Waterboys.

=== The Waterboys ===
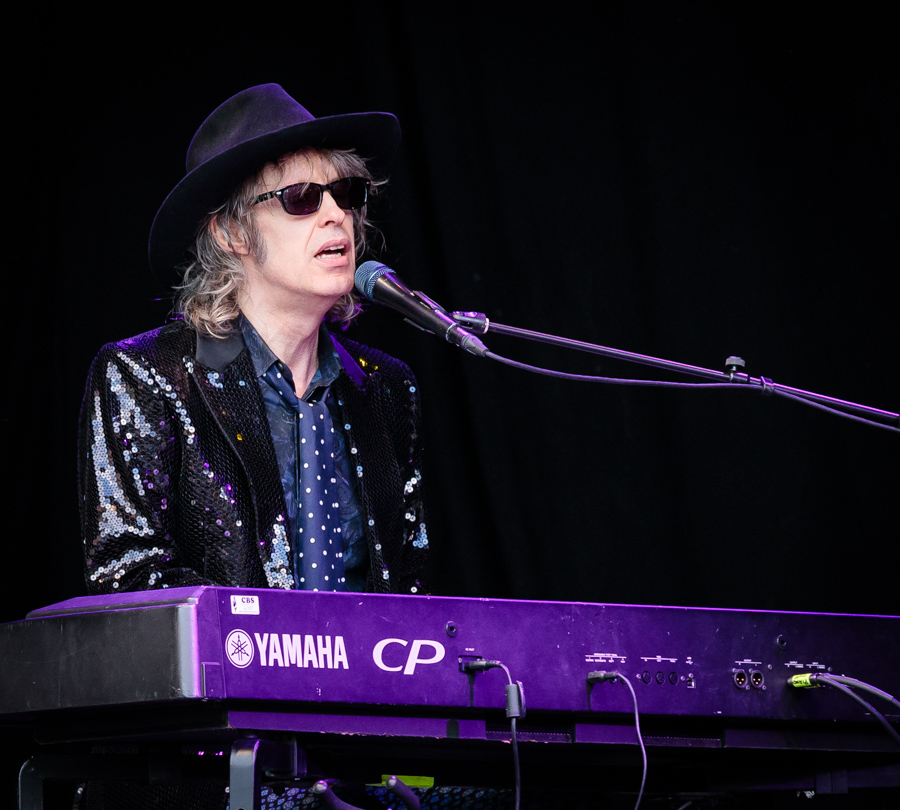
Scott performing with The Waterboys in 2017

The Waterboys' membership has changed a great deal throughout the group's existence. Anthony Thistlethwaite, Karl Wallinger, Kevin Wilkinson and Steve Wickham all made major contributions, but Scott describes the band as his project. "[T]o me there's no difference between Mike Scott and the Waterboys; they both mean the same thing. They mean myself and whoever are my current travelling musical companions." The Waterboys' first release was a single of "A Girl Called Johnny" in March 1983. The first album came out that June. Along with The Waterboys, the next two albums, A Pagan Place and This Is the Sea, released in 1984 and 1985, contained songs mostly written by Scott, and together formed the band's "Big Music" period. After the official addition of fiddler Steve Wickham and a move to Ireland, the next two albums Fisherman's Blues (1988) and Room to Roam (1990) were instead Celtic music-inspired folk music, a sound similar to that of We Free Kings, a band that Scott and Wickham performed with in 1986. Scott's musical style changed again to a more guitar based sound when he, under the name The Waterboys but without any other members, recorded Dream Harder, in 1993. It was a return to the "Big Music" sound but the last album to come out under the band's name until 2000. The band had dissolved over personnel issues and Wickham's desire to remain with a folk-rock, or purely folk music, sound. After two Mike Scott solo albums, A Rock in the Weary Land was released under The Waterboys name, demonstrating yet another musical style, which Scott called "Sonic rock". 2002's Universal Hall was a return to a folk-rock sound. It was followed by Karma to Burn, released in 2005, which was the group's first official live album, Book of Lightning, released in 2007, and An Appointment With Mr Yeats, released in 2011.

=== Solo ===
In addition to the albums he released with The Waterboys, Scott released two solo albums in the 1990s. The first Bring 'Em All In (1995), was recorded at the Findhorn Foundation in north Scotland, with Mike Scott playing all instruments himself. Musician and author Daniel Levitin ends his 2009 book The World in Six Songs with an extended discussion of the song "Bring 'Em All In", calling it "one of the greatest love songs ever written."

For his second solo album, Still Burning (1997), Scott assembled a group of session musicians including Pino Palladino and Jim Keltner. Guesting on the album was former Icicle Works frontman Ian McNabb. Songs from the two albums appeared on 1998's compilation album The Whole of the Moon: The Music of Mike Scott and the Waterboys along with songs from The Waterboys.

Scott's solo albums were positively received by critics but sales were significantly down from Waterboys releases. Following the commercial failure of Still Burning in 1997 Scott was dropped by Chrysalis Records and decided to revive the Waterboys name to achieve wider marketplace exposure, a process described in detail in his autobiography.

Scott created his own record label in 2003, Puck Records, which released The Waterboys' Universal Hall. In 2005, Karma to Burn was released, also by Puck Records, and included tracks from Scott's solo career played by The Waterboys line-up at the time.

After years in the making, Scott produced his show An Appointment with Mr. Yeats, which debuted in Dublin, in Yeats' own Abbey Theatre. In the show, Scott is accompanied by Steve Wickham and other musicians, and the poetry of W. B. Yeats is put to music by Scott. The show ran from 15 to 20 March 2010.

== Solo discography ==
=== Albums ===
- Bring 'Em All In (1995)
- Lion of Love (fan club only release.)
- Sunflowers (fan club only release.)
- Still Burning (1997)
- The Whole of the Moon: The Music of Mike Scott and the Waterboys (1998) (best-of collection)

=== Singles ===
- "Bring 'Em All In" (1995)
- "Building the City of Light" (1995)
- "Love Anyway" (1997)
- "Rare, Precious and Gone" (1998)

== Other contributions ==
- 107.1 KGSR Radio Austin - Broadcasts Vol.10 (2002) - "Bring 'Em All In"

=== Another Pretty Face ===
==== Albums ====
- I'm Sorry That I Beat You, I'm Sorry That I Screamed, But for a Moment There I Really Lost Control (1981) (cassette)

==== Singles ====
- "All the Boys Love Carrie" b/w "That's Not Enough" (1979) (7"; the first run of 1,000 copies with green printing, the second run of 5,000 copies with red printing)
- "Whatever Happened to the West?" b/w "Goodbye 1970s" (1980) (7")
- "Heaven Gets Closer Everyday" b/w "Only Heroes Live Forever" (1980) (7")
- "Soul to Soul" (1981) b/w "A Woman's Place" and "God on the Screen" (7")

=== DNV ===
- "Death in Venice" b/w "Mafia" and the intro to "Goodbye 1970s" (1979) (7")

=== Funhouse ===
- "Out of Control" (1981) b/w "This Could Be Hell" (12"; rarer 7")

== Personal life ==
Scott's first wife was Irene Keogh. He was married to his second wife Janet for 17 years.

He was in a relationship with singer-actress Camille O'Sullivan, with whom he has a daughter born in 2013.

In October 2016, Scott married Japanese artist Megumi Igarashi, who calls herself Rokudenashiko. Their son was born on 2 February 2017. As of 2020, Scott resides in Dublin.
