= Anthony Thistlethwaite =

British multi-instrumentalist (born 1955)

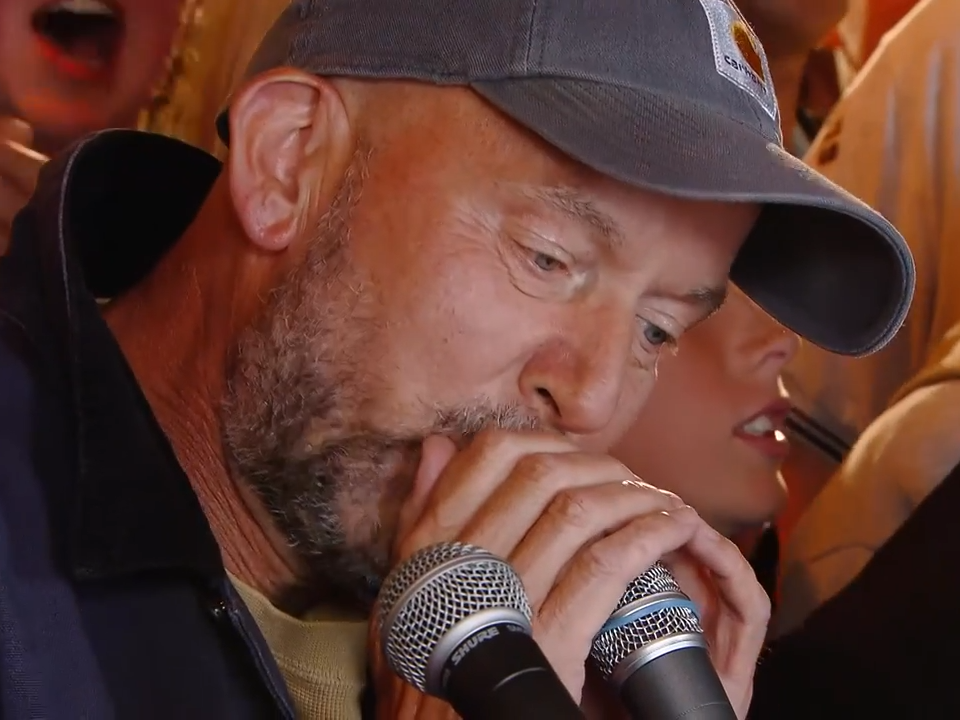
- Thistlethwaite playing harmonica in 2014

Background information
- Born: 31 August 1955 (age 70); Lutterworth, Leicestershire, England
- Genres: Folk rock
- Occupation: Musician
- Instruments: Saxophone; mandolin; harmonica; keyboards; bass; guitar
- Member of: The Saw Doctors
- Formerly of: The Waterboys

Anthony "Anto" Thistlethwaite (born 31 August 1955, Lutterworth, Leicestershire, England) is an English multi-instrumentalist best known as a founding member (with guitarist Mike Scott) of the folk rock group, The Waterboys and later as a long-standing member of Irish rock band The Saw Doctors.

== Career ==
After a year busking in Paris, where he played tenor saxophone around the streets of the Latin Quarter, Thistlethwaite moved to London in 1980. In 1981, he played saxophone on Robyn Hitchcock's Groovy Decay album as well as Nikki Sudden's Waiting on Egypt. Mike Scott heard the saxophone solo on Nikki's "Johnny Smiled Slowly" and invited Thistlethwaite to come and play with his fledgling band, The Red and The Black. Their first record together, "A Girl Called Johnny", was released as The Waterboys' first single in March 1983 and featured Thistlethwaite on tenor sax.

Although Thistlethwaite is mainly known as a saxophonist, he has also featured heavily on mandolin, harmonica, Hammond organ, guitar, and bass with The Waterboys and other acts. During the 1980s and 1990s he featured as a session musician on recordings by bands such as: World Party, Fairground Attraction, Psychedelic Furs, Bob Dylan, China Crisis, Johnny Thunders, Donovan, The Vibrators, Chris De Burgh, Bruce Foxton (The Jam), Aquarium and The Mission.

During the 1990s, he released three solo albums which included contributions from musicians including: Kirsty MacColl, Eddi Reader, Ralph McTell, Mick Taylor, and Sonny Landreth. His third album Crawfish and Caviar consisted of songs recorded in Saint Petersburg, Russia and Louisiana, US.

Thistlethwaite began collaborating musically with The Saw Doctors in the late 1980s, and he became a full-time member in the 2010s.

== Personal life ==
Thistlethwaite became an Irish citizen in 2017. He has resided in Galway since 2007.

Sharon Shannon, also a member of The Waterboys, recorded a song for her eponymous debut album called "Anto's Cajun Cousins", named after Thistlethwaite's American relatives.

== Discography ==
Thistlethwaite has released five solo albums:

- Aesop Wrote a Fable (1993)
- Cartwheels (1995)
- Crawfish and Caviar (1997)
- Back to The Land. The Best of... (2002)
- Stinky Fingers (2011) with Mick Taylor
