= Karma to Burn (The Waterboys album) =

Live album by The Waterboys
- Released: 26 September 2005
- Recorded: 2003–2004
- Genre: Rock
- Label: Puck
- Producer: Chris Madden

The Waterboys chronology
Universal Hall (2003)	Karma to Burn (2005)	Book of Lightning (2007)

Professional ratings
Review scores
Source	Rating
AllMusic	3.5/5 stars

Karma to Burn is the first official live album from The Waterboys. It also contains tracks from Mike Scott's solo career: "Bring 'em All In," "Long Way to the Light," "My Dark Side," and "Open."

Scott explains the name of the album as "experiences yet to be undergone in order to balance past actions" , a reference to the tenet of karma in Hinduism. This is not the first reference to the concept made by the group; a song named "Karma" appeared as part of the single for "The Return of Pan" from Dream Harder. Karma to Burn was one of a large number of titles that the band considered for the album, including "A Long Way to the Light," after the song about The Waterboys' break-up after Dream Harder.

The album cover was created by Toshifumi Tanabu, and incorporates a live photo of Mike Scott by Anthony Pidgeon.

"Long Way to the Light" was recorded in Warwick on 16 October 2003. "Peace Of Iona," "Bring 'em All In," and "The Whole of the Moon" were recorded in Belfast two days later. "Glastonbury Song" is from a concert at Plymouth on 29 October of that year. "Medicine Bow" was recorded in Basingstoke on 15 October. "The Pan Within" is taken from a Dublin show on 21 October. "Open" is taken from two concerts, one in Liverpool on 26 October 2004, and from a later concert in Galway on 23 November. "The Return of Jimi Hendrix" is from 25 November in Cork. Both "My Dark Side" and "Fisherman's Blues" were recorded in Cheltenham on 30 October 2003. "A Song for the Life" is from a 27 November 2004 show in Athlone. "Come Live with Me" is also from two separate concerts, the same Galway show as "Open," and the same Cork show as "The Return of Jimi Hendrix."

== Track listing ==
All songs by Mike Scott, except where noted.

1. "Long Way to the Light" – 6.32
2. "Peace of Iona" – 7.13
3. "Glastonbury Song" – 4.35
4. "Medicine Bow" (Scott, Anthony Thistlethwaite) – 3.09
5. "The Pan Within" – 13.14
6. "Open" – 4.14
7. "The Return of Jimi Hendrix" – 5.16
8. "My Dark Side" – 4.12
9. "A Song for the Life" (Traditional) – 4.27
10. "Bring 'Em All In" – 4.02
11. "The Whole of the Moon" – 5.46
12. "Fisherman's Blues" (Scott, Steve Wickham) – 5.56
13. "Come Live with Me" (Felice Bryant, Boudleaux Bryant) – 7.10

== Personnel ==
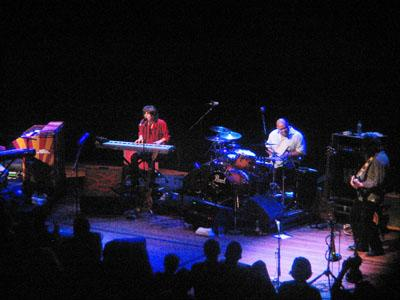
The Waterboys performing in Dublin in 2004, when "The Pan Within" was recorded.

- Mike Scott – vocals, lead and rhythm guitar, piano (track 11)
- Steve Wickham – fiddle, mandoline, bells
- Carlos Hercules – drums, cymbal
- Steve Walters – bass
- Richard Naiff – piano, Hammond organ, keyboards
- Sharon Shannon – accordion (track 9)
