= Everybody Takes a Tumble =

Single by The Waterboys

from the album Book of Lightning
- B-side: "Ain't Doin' Too Bad"
- Released: 2007
- Length: 4:25 (single version); 7:08 (album version)
- Label: W14 Music
- Songwriter(s): Mike Scott; Anthony Thistlethwaite
- Producer(s): Mike Scott; Phil Tennant

The Waterboys singles chronology
"We Are Jonah" (2000)	"Everybody Takes a Tumble" (2007)	"Sweet Dancer" (2011)

"Everybody Takes a Tumble" is a song from Scottish-Irish folk rock band The Waterboys, released as the only single from their ninth studio album Book of Lightning. It was written by Mike Scott and Anthony Thistlethwaite, and produced by Scott and Phil Tennant.

== Background ==
"Everybody Takes a Tumble" was written in early 1986, when Scott moved to Dublin. The song was not recorded at the time, but retained for possible future use alongside Scott's other unreleased songs. The Waterboys began performing the song live as early as 2005 before recording it for Book of Lightning.

Speaking of the song, Scott told Terry Staunton of Record Collector in 2007: "Everybody Takes a Tumble" is pretty much a snapshot of what the music scene was like in Dublin when I went to live there. The first line mentions Phil Lynott, who died the day I moved to Ireland. Sinéad O'Connor was just starting at that time, so she's namechecked, and Van Morrison had this song at the time where he was singing about other artists copying his style, so I included a line about that." The song's also references Brush Shiels and The Blades.

== Reception ==
In a review of Book of Lightning, James Christopher Monger of AllMusic felt "Everybody Takes a Tumble" was "nearly a carbon copy" of "Fisherman's Blues" and added that it "feels like a campfire full of good-natured charlatans on a stormy night, just waiting to talk the ear off of some lucky (or unlucky) traveler". Dave Simpson of The Guardian described it as a "delirious, heady waltz" and "possibly the best song [Scott's] completed since "The Whole of the Moon"." Fiona Jerome of musicOMH commented: "There are songs that would slot straight into their late '80s repertoire, particularly the lengthy "Everybody Takes a Tumble"."

Lee Davis of inthenews.co.uk wrote: "The album runs the full gamut of emotions before catapulting into the blissful 'kiss-and-make-up' moment writ large in the vibrant, fiddle-fuelled "Everybody Takes a Tumble"." Finbarr Bermingham of The Skinny felt the song was "welcomed as one of the more upbeat numbers". Michael Keefe of PopMatters described it as a "deceptively sunny-sounding song of revenge". Ian Abrahams of Record Collector considered the song to "musically resemble" "Fisherman's Blues" and also thought it had the same "centred honesty".

Ed Condran of The Record described the song as "one of the most charming tracks from Book of Lightning". Karl Leslie of St. Cloud Times noted: "...by the time you get to the end of the disc and "Everybody Takes a Tumble" kicks in, it sounds like he's searching to recreate the acoustic magic of the band's 1987 masterpiece "Fisherman's Blues"." Kevin O'Hare of the Star Tribune considered the song one of the best on the album and added that it "name-drops Sinéad O'Connor and Van Morrison while skipping around Wickham's fiddle and Naiff's organ."

== Formats ==
7" single
No.	Title	Length
1.	"Everybody Takes a Tumble" (Single Version)	4:25
2.	"Ain't Doin' Too Bad"	2:20

CD single
No.	Title	Length
1.	"Everybody Takes a Tumble" (Single Version)	4:25
2.	"Killing My Heart" (Live)	4:18
3.	"All Things Must Pass" (Live)	3:57

CD single (European promo)
No.	Title	Length
1.	"Everybody Takes a Tumble" (Single Version)	4:25

== Personnel ==
Everybody Takes a Tumble

- Mike Scott – vocals, acoustic guitar, pianola, sleighbell
- Steve Wickham – fiddle
- Richard Naiff – organ
- Mark Smith – bass
- Jeremy Stacey – drums

Ain't Doing Too Bad

- Mike Scott – vocals, guitar
- Richard Naiff – piano
- Mark Smith – bass
- Brady Blade – drums

Killing My Heart

- Mike Scott – vocals, guitar
- Steve Wickham – electric fiddle
- Richard Naiff – organ
- Steve Walters – bass
- Carlos Hercules – drums

All Things Must Pass

- Mike Scott – vocals, guitar
- Steve Wickham – fiddle
- Richard Naiff – piano

Production

- Mike Scott, Phil Tennant – producer
- Ren Swan, Steve Evans – mixing
- Tim Martin – recording, mixing
- Martin Harrison – recording on "Killing My Heart"
- Heike Langguth – recording engineer on "All Things Must Pass"
- Christoph Romanowski, Inge Schmidt – recording technicians on "All Things Must Pass"
- Volker Steppaf, Arne Schumacher – recording and concert production on "All Things Must Pass"

== Charts ==
Chart (2007)	Peak position
UK Singles Chart	125
