= And a Bang on the Ear =

1989 single by the Waterboys

Single by the Waterboys

from the album Fisherman's Blues
- B-side: "The Raggle Taggle Gypsy"
- Released: 19 June 1989
- Length: 7:29
- Label: Ensign, Chrysalis
- Songwriter(s): Mike Scott
- Producer(s): John Dunford, Mike Scott

The Waterboys singles chronology
"Fisherman's Blues" (1988)	"And a Bang on the Ear" (1989)	"How Long Will I Love You?" (1990)

"And a Bang on the Ear" is a song from Scottish-Irish folk rock band the Waterboys, released on 19 June 1989 as the second single from their fourth studio album, Fisherman's Blues. It was written by Mike Scott, and produced by John Dunford and Scott. The song reached No. 1 in Ireland and No. 51 in the United Kingdom.

== Background ==
The song was recorded at Spiddal House in Spiddal, Connemara, County Galway, Ireland, in April 1988. In 2006, fiddle player Steve Wickham recalled of the song, "We played a lot of takes before we got this right. It is often the simple ones that are the most difficult." The single's B-side, "The Raggle Taggle Gypsy", was recorded live at Barrowlands Ballroom in Glasgow.

== Critical reception ==
On its release as a single, Music & Media wrote, "Easy-going, traditional folk material with a strong melody line and good lyrics. Stylewise, an uncompromising song but one that could be a hit." Tim Nicholson of Record Mirror noted, "Song title of the week, and a jig so authentic that it's almost immune from criticism." John Wilde of Melody Maker picked it as the "single of the week" and wrote, "This romp through Scott's old flames verges on the ridiculous, but I'm sure it's meant to. It's not just ridiculous. The Waterboys have never sounded quite so breezy." Barbara Ellen of New Musical Express described the song as "charming" and wrote, "A gorgeously delivered fiddle-strewn folk love ballad, it only occasional sounds like a One-Man-Band falling over a pile of milk bottles. This is 'whispers-in-shadows' stuff, and Scott remains a gifted storyteller with his tongue firmly implanted in his cheek."

In a review of Fisherman's Blues, Stereo Review described the song as "lilting, rollicking, and altogether effortless". The reviewer added, "It flows in a way that suggests Scott has arrived at some breakthrough in his conception of the Waterboys." Audio picked the song as the album's "best cut" and described it as "a bouncy ditty full of cyanide and vinegar". Ira Robbins, writing in The Trouser Press Record Guide, considered the song to be "rollicking" and one of the album's tracks to "make the most of Scott's adopted heritage". Ian Abrahams of Record Collector felt the song had a "wistful romance".

In a 2017 retrospective on the "best of Mike Scott", Tom Doyle of Q included "And a Bang on the Ear" as one of ten tracks on the list and described it as a "touching tune in which Scott takes us through the tales of each of his romances".

== Track listings ==
7-inch and cassette single
No.	Title	Length
1.	"And a Bang on the Ear"	6:45
2.	"The Raggle Taggle Gypsy"	4:36

12-inch and CD single
No.	Title	Length
1.	"And a Bang on the Ear"	7:29
2.	"The Raggle Taggle Gypsy"	4:36

CD single (US release)
No.	Title	Length
1.	"And a Bang on the Ear (Edit)"	6:45
2.	"And a Bang on the Ear"	7:25
3.	"The Raggle Taggle Gypsy"	4:35

== Personnel ==
The Waterboys

- Mike Scott – vocals, guitar, piano on "And a Bang on the Ear"
- Steve Wickham – fiddle
- Máirtín O'Connor – accordion
- Anthony Thistlethwaite – Hammond organ on "And a Bang on the Ear", mandolin on "The Raggle Taggle Gypsy"
- Trevor Hutchinson – bass
- Jay Dee Daugherty – drums
- Vinnie Kilduff – uilleann pipes on "The Raggle Taggle Gypsy"
- Colin Blakey – tin whistle on "The Raggle Taggle Gypsy"

Production

- John Dunford – producer and mixing of "And a Bang on the Ear"
- Mike Scott – producer of "And a Bang on the Ear"
- Phil Tennant – producer of "The Raggle Taggle Gypsy"
- John Grimes – recording of "And a Bang on the Ear"

== Charts ==
Chart (1989)	Peak position
Ireland (IRMA)	1
UK Singles (OCC)	51
