= A Life of Sundays =

1990 song by The Waterboys

Song by The Waterboys

from the album Room to Roam
- Released: 1990
- Length: 6:18
- Label: Chrysalis; Ensign
- Songwriter: Mike Scott
- Producers: Barry Beckett; Mike Scott

"A Life of Sundays" is a song by the Scottish-Irish folk rock band The Waterboys, which was released in 1990 as a track on their fifth studio album Room to Roam. It was written by Mike Scott and produced by Barry Beckett and Scott. In the United States, the song reached No. 15 on Billboard Modern Rock Tracks chart and remained on the chart for nine weeks.

== Background ==
Describing the song in the liner notes of the 2008 re-issue of Room to Roam, Scott said: "Across its six minute span, 'A Life of Sundays' features rock 'n' roll, blues, soul, African, psychedelia, punk or glam, Irish literature and no-nonsense trad." The song was recorded at Spiddal House, Spiddal, County Galway, Ireland in 1990.

== Critical reception ==
In a review of Room to Roam, Bruce Dessau of The Guardian commented, "'A Life of Sundays', with its talk of a 'sense of wonder', harks back to both the original Celtic pop mystic Van Morrison and the love-stricken metaphysical poets." Iestyn George of Record Mirror described the song as the album's "only rock concession" and noted "its crescendo of malevolent, thrusting bass, Hammond organ and brash chords behind Scott's Dylanesque delivery which is joined by Noel Bridgeman's stirring and gutsy backing vocals". Neil McKay of Sunday Life said of the album, "It's all quite enjoyable in its own way, but the record only comes alive when Scott unobtrusively assimilates the folk influences in outstanding songs like 'A Life of Sundays'." John Mulvey of Uncut described the song as an "ecstatic rocker".

John Milward of The Philadelphia Inquirer commented, "It's the frantic edge of Steve Wickham's fiddle that puts the adrenaline into ruminative rockers such as 'A Life of Sundays'." Gene Armstrong of the Arizona Daily Star stated, "With its 5-minute length, rumbling rhythm section, squawking horn and riffing guitars, 'A Life of Sundays' is the album's rock single, if in fact this band cares about such things anymore." Brant Houston of the Hartford Courant described the song as "semi-psychedelic" and "solely The Waterboys" in its style.

Musician described the song as a "college radio-ready rocker" which "devolves into a wonderfully unwieldy guitar frenzy". Mike Curtin of The Post-Star wrote, "Only on the most fully developed material, notably 'Further Up, Further In' and 'A Life of Sundays,' do Scott and company fulfill their promise of a satisfying synthesis of traditional and modern styles." Eric McClary of the Reno Gazette-Journal said, "Unfortunately, only 'A Life of Sundays' comes close to the visionary wanderings of the last Waterboys album, Fisherman's Blues."

== Personnel ==
The Waterboys

- Mike Scott – vocals, guitar
- Anthony Thistlethwaite – saxophone
- Steve Wickham – fiddle, Hammond organ
- Trevor Hutchinson – bass
- Colin Blakey – flute
- Sharon Shannon – accordion
- Noel Bridgeman – drums, percussion, backing vocals

Production

- Barry Beckett, Mike Scott – producers
- Tim Martin – engineer
- Robbie Adams – assistant engineer

== Charts ==
Chart (1990)	Peak position
US Billboard Modern Rock Tracks	15
