= Skid (album) =

Studio album by Skid Row
- Released: October 1970
- Genre: Hard rock
- Length: 40:41
- Label: CBS (Europe); Epic (US and Canada)
- Producer: Clifford Davis

Skid Row chronology
Skid (1970)	34 Hours (1971)

Professional ratings
Review scores
Source	Rating
Collector's Guide to Heavy Metal	8/10

Skid is a 1970 debut album by Irish band Skid Row featuring guitar virtuoso Gary Moore. Released in October 1970, it made #30 on the UK album chart.

== Track listing ==
Side one

1. "Mad Dog Woman" (Brendan Shiels) – 3:48
2. "Virgo's Daughter" (Shiels) – 4:23
3. "Heading Home Again" (Shiels) – 2:44
4. "An Awful Lot of Woman" (Shiels) – 2:06
5. "Unco-Up Showband Blues" (Shiels, Gary Moore, Noel Bridgeman) – 6:11

Side two

6. "For Those Who Do" (Shiels, Moore, Bridgeman) – 4:54
7. "After I'm Gone" (Shiels) – 2:55
8. "The Man Who Never Was" (Shiels, Moore, Bridgeman) – 2:29
9. "Felicity" (Moore) – 11:11

== Personnel ==
Skid Row

- Gary Moore – guitar, vocals
- Brush Shiels – bass, vocals
- Noel Bridgeman – drums, vocals
