= World Party (song) =

Song by The Waterboys

from the album Fisherman's Blues
- Released: 1988
- Length: 4:01
- Label: Chrysalis; Ensign
- Songwriter(s): Mike Scott; Trevor Hutchinson; Karl Wallinger
- Producer(s): Mike Scott

"World Party" is a song by the Scottish-Irish folk rock band The Waterboys, released in 1988 as a track on their fourth studio album Fisherman's Blues. It was written by Mike Scott, Trevor Hutchinson and Karl Wallinger, and produced by Scott. In the United States, the song reached No. 19 on Billboard Modern Rock Tracks chart and remained on the chart for six weeks. It also peaked at No. 48 on Billboard's Album Rock Tracks chart.

"World Party" was written in Summer 1985, shortly after the completion of the band's third studio album This Is The Sea. The lyrics were inspired by Live Aid. The song was recorded at Windmill Lane Studios in Dublin, Ireland on 25 March 1987.

== Reception ==
In a review of Fisherman's Blues, Lise Hand of the Sunday Independent described the song as "uplifting". The Post-Star wrote: "The jarring figures on "We Will Not Be Lovers" and "World Party" mirror the urgency of Scott's lyrics far better than a standard rock backing would do." Jim Bohen of the Daily Record considered the song's "pounding piano" to be "reminiscent of the Beatles' White Album".

Gene Armstrong of the Arizona Daily Star commented: "The title song, "We Will Not Be Lovers" and "World Party" nail me every play because they sound like rock 'n' roll but "feel" like centuries-old traditionals." The Palm Beach Post noted the "bouncy title cut" but the reviewer was "more impressed" with the "folk-rockers" "World Party" and "We Will Not Be Lovers", which they described as being "propelled along by locomotive-like fiddles and vocal chants."

Kenneth Johnson of The Star Democrat wrote: "The band does a good job with "World Party". The fiddle shines through and the tune breathes life thanks to it and Scott's piano playing." Steve Terrell of The Santa Fe New Mexican commented: "Steve Wickham's maniacal fiddle distinguishes several cuts on the first side, including "World Party" - which has the same bass line as Michael Jackson's "Beat It"." Mark Lepage of the Montreal Gazette wrote: ""World Party", with its funky R&B piano and caustic riff on the fuzz mandolin, manages to sound completely unlike Hothouse Flowers' upbeat brand of rock 'n' roll."

== Personnel ==
The Waterboys

- Mike Scott - vocals, piano
- Steve Wickham - fiddle
- Anthony Thistlethwaite - mandolin
- Roddy Lorimer - trumpet
- Trevor Hutchinson - bass
- Kevin Wilkinson - drums
- Noel Bridgeman - tambourine, congas

Additional personnel

- The Abergavenny Male Voice Choir - choir
- Jenny Haan, Rachel Nolan, Ruth Nolan - chorus vocals

Production

- Mike Scott - producer
- Pearse Dunne - engineer

== Charts ==
Chart (1989)	Peak position
US Billboard Album Rock Tracks	48
US Billboard Modern Rock Tracks	19
