= Book of Lightning =

Studio album by the Waterboys
- Released: 2 April 2007
- Studio: Mike Scott's home studio London, Vancouver
- Genre: Rock
- Label: Puck
- Producer: Mike Scott, Philip Tennant

The Waterboys chronology
Karma to Burn (2005)	Book of Lightning (2007)	In a Special Place – The Piano Demos for This Is the Sea (2011)

Professional ratings
Review scores
Source	Rating
AllMusic	3.5/5 stars
BBC	Favourable
Contactmusic.com	9/10 stars
The Guardian	5/5 stars
Insight Magazine	Favourable
Inthenews.co.uk	9/10 stars
Manchester Evening News	4/5 stars
MusicOMH	3/5 stars
Q	2/5 stars
Uncut	4/5 stars

Book of Lightning is the ninth studio album by the Waterboys, released on 2 April 2007 through W14/Universal Records. The album contains ten tracks, produced by Mike Scott and Philip Tennant, with musical contributions from Steve Wickham (fiddle), Richard Naiff (keyboards), Brady Blade (drums), Mark Smith (bass), Leo Abrahams (lead guitar), Jeremy Stacey (drums) plus long-time Waterboys alumni Roddy Lorimer (trumpet), Chris Bruce (lead guitar) and Thighpaulsandra (keyboards). Book of Lightning was recorded in London with the exceptions of one song recorded in Vancouver with members of Canadian art-pop band Great Aunt Ida, and another in Scott's home studio.

== Track listing ==
All tracks by Mike Scott except where noted.

1. "The Crash of Angel Wings" – 4:02
2. "Love Will Shoot You Down" – 4:34
3. "Nobody's Baby Anymore" – 4:43
4. "Strange Arrangement" – 3:33
5. "She Tried to Hold Me" – 7:18
6. "It's Gonna Rain" – 3:03
7. "Sustain" (Scott, Ida Nilsen) – 3:21
8. "You in the Sky" – 4:38
9. "Everybody Takes a Tumble" (Scott, Anthony Thistlethwaite) – 7:05
10. "The Man With the Wind at His Heels" (Scott, Steve Wickham, Thistlethwaite) – 3:04

== Personnel ==
- Mike Scott – vocals (all tracks), electric guitar (tracks 1, 3, 7, 10), acoustic guitar (track 1, 5–10), tambourine (track 1), piano (track 1, 9), loops (track 1, 6) rhythm guitar (track 2), keyboards (track 6–8, 10), effects (track 6), bells (track 7–9)
- Mark Smith – bass (Note: Credited as Earth resonator) (tracks 1, 3–6, 8, 9)
- Jeremy Stacey – drums (tracks 1, 2, 6, 9)
- Thighpaulsandra – psychedelic extravaganza (synthesizers) (track 1)
- Leo Abrahams – guitars (tracks 2–5), acoustic guitar (track 5), lead guitar (track 6)
- Clive Deamer – percussion (track 2)
- Mike Rowe – outro electric piano (track 2), organ (track 5)
- Johnny Andrews – vocals (track 2)
- Steve Wickham – fiddle (track 3, 4, 7–9), viola (track 7)
- Brady Blade – drums (tracks 3–5, 8)
- Richard Naiff – piano (track 4, 8), organ (track 9)
- Chris Bruce – lead guitar (track 5)
- Daniel Presley – backing and harmony vocals (track 6)
- Annie Wilkinson – bass (track 7)
- Barry Mirochnick – drums (track 7)
- Ida Nilsen – piano (track 7)
- Roddy Lorimer – trumpet (track 7)

== Charts ==
Chart performance
Chart (2007)	Peak position
Dutch Albums (Album Top 100)	73
Greek Albums (IFPI)	30
Irish Albums (IRMA)	19
Norwegian Albums (VG-lista)	12
Scottish Albums (OCC)	34
UK Albums (OCC)	51
