= Legend (Robin of Sherwood soundtrack) =

- Legend album cover, featuring actor Michael Praed as Robin of Sherwood.

Soundtrack album by Clannad
- Released: April 1984
- Studio: Windmill Lane, Dublin, Ireland; Trident, London
- Genre: Soundtrack
- Length: 32:33
- Label: RCA
- Producer: Tony Clarke

Clannad chronology
Magical Ring (1983)	Legend (1984)	Macalla (1985)

Singles from Legend
- 1. "Robin (The Hooded Man)"; 2. "Now Is Here"; 3. "Scarlet Inside"

Professional ratings
Review scores
Source	Rating
AllMusic	2.5/5 stars

Legend is a 1984 soundtrack album for the ITV television series Robin of Sherwood, by the Irish band Clannad. It is their seventh album. In 1985, this album won the BAFTA award for Best Original Television Music, making Clannad the first Irish band to win the award.

== Singles released ==
"Robin (The Hooded Man)", the title theme from the series, was released on a 7-inch single in 1984, featuring actor Michael Praed as Robin of Sherwood on the sleeve.

"Now Is Here" and "Scarlet Inside" were released as follow-up singles.

A re-recorded version of "Robin (The Hooded Man)" was released in 1986 as "the Robin of Sherwood EP", featuring Jason Connery on the sleeve. This version of the theme song has not been released in any format since the original vinyl release. For this re-release, the B-sides include "Now Is Here", "Herne" and "Caisleán Óir" (as it appears on the album Macalla).

== Alternative versions of songs ==
In addition to the tracks on Legend, which were used extensively in the series, music composed for the show was occasionally released elsewhere in different versions.

"Caislean Oir", the introduction track to Clannad's album Macalla, appears in an alternative version as incidental music in the series.

In 2003, Clannad albums from the Sony/BMG label were remastered and released with new cover art, and remixes as bonus tracks. For the 2003 Deluxe Edition of Legend, the bonus track was "Together We – Cantoma Mix".

On the 2005 release Clannad: Live in Concert, there were live performances of unreleased music including "Dance & Teidhir Abhaile Riu" from Series 1 and "Action" and "Royal" from Series 3 as part of a "Robin of Sherwood Medley".

== Previously unreleased music ==
In a statement posted in November 2003 on their official web site, Clannad revealed that:

"there were several other pieces of music recorded for the 3rd series of Robin of Sherwood that were not included on the Legend album. Unfortunately no-one has been able to locate the master tapes of this music. The search is continuing and hopefully one day these recordings will be able to be released".

Beginning in March 2002, DVD releases, and eventually Blu-ray releases, of Robin of Sherwood feature a "music only" track for many of the episodes, including music that was not included on Legend and music recorded after the album was released.

=== 40th anniversary release of recovered music ===
A 40th-anniversary version of the album was released in October 2024, featuring a six-panel digipak with 16-page booklet and 11 previously unreleased bonus tracks. Most of the unreleased tracks were finally released on this version of the album. Pól Brennan announced, "After looking extensively for the ‘lost tapes’ for more than 10 years...and after another trawl last year they were surprisingly discovered in an ITV archive. I had great fun listening and reviewing the music and bringing this collection of tracks back to life.” This set did not include the song from the episode "Herne's Son", where there is a sword fight between Lord Owen of Clun and Robert of Huntingdon (Robin Hood).

== Live performances ==
During Clannad's 1984 tour, the setlist included full live versions of "Lady Marian", "Now Is Here", "Robin (The Hooded Man)", "Scarlet Inside", "Herne", "Ancient Forest" and "Battles".

Since then the band have regularly included a "Robin of Sherwood Medley" in their setlist, typically including the title song, and segments of "Lady Marian", "Herne" and "Ancient Forest", as well as songs that were lost until 2024, including; "Dance" from Series 1 and two songs from Series 3 entitled "Action" and "Royal" that were only released on live albums including Clannad: Live in Concert (released in 2005).

== Track listing ==
=== Original album (1984) ===
1. "Robin (The Hooded Man)" (Ciarán Brennan) – 2:48
2. "Now Is Here" (Pól Brennan) – 3:32
3. "Herne" (P. Brennan) – 5:08
4. "Together We" (P. Brennan) – 3:28
5. "Darkmere" (C. Brennan) – 1:59
6. "Strange Land" (P. Brennan) – 3:10
7. "Scarlet Inside" (P. Brennan) – 5:08
8. "Lady Marian" (C. Brennan) – 3:20
9. "Battles" (C. Brennan) – 1:01
10. "Ancient Forest" (P. Brennan, C. Brennan, Máire Brennan) – 2:59
11. "Together We – Cantoma Mix" (bonus track available only on 2003 Deluxe Edition) - 2:05

=== Disc 2 of 40th Anniversary Edition (2024) ===
1. "A Royal Procession" (C. Brennan, P. Brennan) – 3:18
2. "Court of Marian" (C. Brennan, P. Brennan) – 2:11
3. "Time for Action" (James Delaney) – 2:07
4. "The Forest Dancers" (C. Brennan, P. Brennan) – 2:01
5. "Robin and Marian" (C. Brennan, P. Brennan) – 1:30
6. "Dance in the Great Hall" (C. Brennan, P. Brennan) – 2:11
7. "Nothing’s Forgotten" (C. Brennan, P. Brennan) – 2:19
8. "Betrayed" (C. Brennan, P. Brennan) – 2:11
9. "Herne the Mystic" (C. Brennan, P. Brennan) – 2:52
10. "Regal Steel" (C. Brennan, P. Brennan) – 3:37
11. "The Melancholy Outlaws" (Delaney) – 2:25

== Personnel ==
Clannad

- Máire Brennan – lead vocal, harp
- Pól Brennan – guitar, flute, tin whistle, keyboards, vocals
- Ciarán Brennan – double bass, synthesisers, guitar, vocals
- Pádraig Duggan – mandola, guitar, vocals
- Noel Duggan – guitar, vocals

Additional musicians

- James Delaney – keyboards
- Paul Moran – drums
- Pat Farrell – electric guitar
- Frank Ricotti – percussion

== Charts ==
=== Weekly charts ===
Chart (1984–85)	Peak position
New Zealand Albums (RMNZ)	9
UK Albums (OCC)	15
US World Albums (Billboard)	15

=== Year-end charts ===
Chart (1985)	Position
New Zealand Albums (RMNZ)	42

== Singles ==
1. "Robin (The Hooded Man)"
2. "Now Is Here"
3. "Scarlet Inside"
4. "Robin (The Hooded Man)" EP (series three remix of theme tune)
