= Fisherman's Blues =

Studio album by the Waterboys
- Released: 17 October 1988
- Recorded: 1986–88
- Studios: Windmill Lane Studio & Spiddal House
- Genre: Folk rock
- Length: 54:37
- Labels: Ensign, Chrysalis
- Producers: Mike Scott, Vinnie Kilduff, Bob Johnston, John Dunford

The Waterboys chronology
This Is the Sea (1985)	Fisherman's Blues (1988)	Room to Roam (1990)

Singles from Fisherman's Blues
- 1. "Fisherman's Blues" Released: December 1988; 2. "And a Bang on the Ear" Released: June 1989

Fisherman's Blues is the fourth studio album by the Waterboys, released by Ensign Records in October 1988. The album marked a change in the band's sound, with them abandoning their earlier grandiose rock sound for a mixture of traditional Irish music, traditional Scottish music, country music, and rock and roll. Critics were divided on its release with some disappointed at the change of direction and others ranking it among the Waterboys' best work. The album was the Waterboys' best selling album, reaching a number 13 placing on the U.K. charts on release, and 76 on the Billboard 200.

== Production history ==
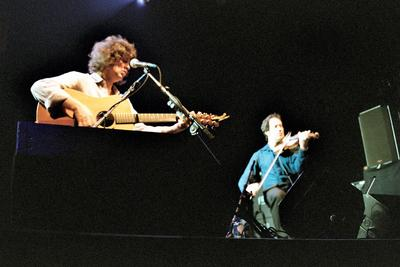
Scott (left) and Wickham (right) collaborated on songwriting for Fisherman's Blues.

The history behind Fisherman's Blues begins with Steve Wickham's contribution to "The Pan Within" on the preceding Waterboys album This Is the Sea. Wickham joined the group officially in 1985 after This Is the Sea had been released. Mike Scott, the Waterboys' leader, spent time in Dublin with Wickham, and moved to Ireland in 1986. That year, the Waterboys performed "Fisherman's Blues" on The Tube, which was the first time the new musical direction the band was taking was demonstrated.

The recording sessions for the album were lengthy and produced a great deal of music. The sessions began at Windmill Lane Studio in Dublin and lasted from January through March 1986. An additional session took place that December in San Francisco. From March to August 1987, the Waterboys were recording in Windmill Lane again. Scott moved to Galway and another year passed as the band recorded at Spiddal House, where Scott was living. The entire second side of the original record is made up of recordings from this 1988 session. The album was released that October. Scott describes the process; "We started recording our fourth album in early '86 and completed it 100 songs and 2 years later". Scott recalled of the album in a 1993 interview with Melody Maker, "There was a lot of indecision. I got too involved in the album and I lost perspective. We had blues songs, gospel songs, country songs, rock songs and ballads. I didn't know where to take it. It could've been a gospel or country album. It could've sounded more like This Is the Sea or it could've been a traditional album. It could've been anything."

More songs from the album's recording sessions were released on Too Close to Heaven, or Fisherman's Blues, Part 2 as it was titled in the United States, in 2002 by BMG and Razor and Tie Entertainment, respectively. Other songs from the sessions were unreleased for years, including one of the defining tracks of sessions, "Higher In Time", a cover of Bob Dylan's "I'll Be Your Baby Tonight", "The Man With the Wind at His Heels", "Stranger to Me", "Saints and Angels", and "Born to Be Together". A remastered "Collector's Edition" with additional tracks was released in May 2006.

=== Fisherman's Box ===
A 7-CD box set, Fisherman's Box: The Complete Fisherman's Blues Sessions (1986-1988), containing 121 tracks from the album sessions including all those on the original record and subsequent editions, plus a further 85 unreleased tracks was released on 14 October 2013.

== Songs ==
The title track peaked at number three on the Billboard Modern Rock chart. The single for the song reached position 32 on the UK singles charts in 1989 and position 75, when re-issued in 1991. Country music song "The Lost Highway", featuring Liam Ó Maonlaí on piano, appeared on the B-side. "Fisherman's Blues" was used on the pilot episode of the TV series Lights Out, and has appeared on the soundtracks of the movies Good Will Hunting, Waking Ned Devine and Dream with the Fishes. Actress Emilia Clarke performed a cover version for the film Dom Hemingway.

"Sweet Thing" is a "surprisingly successful" cover of a song by Van Morrison, originally from Morrison's 1968 album, Astral Weeks. The Waterboys' version on this album is a medley; the song ends with the unplanned addition of verses from The Beatles' "Blackbird", which Scott impulsively sang on the spot. A different recording of the song appeared on the second compact disc of the re-release of This Is the Sea.

"Strange Boat" lends its title to Ian Abrahams' biography of Mike Scott and the Waterboys, while the song "World Party" was the inspiration for Karl Wallinger's band name. It reached position 19 on Billboard's Modern Rock chart, and was voted number 69 on the KROQ Top 106.7 Countdown of 1989.

Jimmy Hickey, of the instrumental song "Jimmy Hickey's Waltz", was a member of the album's production crew. The track begins with a recording of some conversation and laughter, which continues in the background as a violin begins to play a short waltz. The recording ends with some applause.

"And a Bang on the Ear", in which Scott summarises a past romantic attachment in each verse, finishing the song with a current "woman of the hearthfire", was released as the second single from the album. A live version of "The Raggle Taggle Gypsy" made up the B-side. A studio version of "The Raggle Taggle Gypsy" would appear on the Waterboys' next album Room to Roam. The single was chosen as a Radio One "Single of the Week", but failed to chart. Confusion amongst listeners about what a bang on the ear might be about prompted the Waterboys' Frequently Asked Questions page to note, more than ten years later, that it was "a term of affection". A "bang" means a kiss and this Irish phrase of "bang on the ear" can best be considered equivalent to the more common phrase "peck on the cheek".

"Has Anybody Here Seen Hank" is a country music tribute to Hank Williams, listening to whom Scott described as "a life-changing experience". The Waterboys had previously paid tribute to a different influence on Scott, Patti Smith, with the song "A Girl Called Johnny" on their first album, The Waterboys.

"Dunford's Fancy" was written by Wickham for Steve Dunford, brother to Waterboys producer John Dunford.

"The Stolen Child" was the first William Butler Yeats poem that the Waterboys put to music. Another Yeats poem "Love and Death" appeared on Dream Harder in 1993. "The Stolen Child", spoken by traditional Irish vocalist Tomás Mac Eoin with backup vocals by Scott, remains the group's "most famous poetic rendition".

The final song is only a brief snippet of the Woody Guthrie folk song "This Land Is Your Land" with some of the American place names replaced with Irish ones.

== Critical reception ==
Professional ratings
Review scores
Source	Rating
AllMusic	4.5/5 stars
Chicago Sun-Times	3/4 stars
Daily News	3.5/4 stars
Mojo	4/5 stars
NME	6/10
The Observer	5/5 stars
The Philadelphia Inquirer	3/4 stars
Q	4/5 stars
Rolling Stone	4/5 stars
Uncut	5/5 stars

Fisherman's Blues was included in the book 1001 Albums You Must Hear Before You Die.

== Track listing ==
=== Fisherman's Blues (1988) ===
1. "Fisherman's Blues" (Mike Scott, Steve Wickham) – 4:26
2. "We Will Not Be Lovers" (Scott) – 7:03
3. "Strange Boat" (Scott, Anthony Thistlethwaite) – 3:06
4. "World Party" (Scott, Trevor Hutchinson, Karl Wallinger) – 4:01
5. "Sweet Thing" (Van Morrison) – 7:14
6. "Jimmy Hickey's Waltz" (Scott, Wickham, Thistlethwaite) – 2:06
7. "And a Bang on the Ear" (Scott, Wickham, Thistlethwaite) – 9:14
8. "Has Anybody Here Seen Hank?" (Scott) – 3:19
9. "When Will We Be Married?" (Traditional, adapted: Scott, Thistlethwaite) – 3:01
10. "When Ye Go Away" (Scott) – 3:45
11. "Dunford's Fancy" (Wickham) – 1:04
12. "The Stolen Child" (Words: W.B. Yeats, Music: Scott) – 6:55
13. "This Land Is Your Land" (Woody Guthrie) – 0:56

Jimmy Hickey's Waltz is not present on 1988 Ensign vinyl release. Though it is not listed at the back of the 1988 CD box, it features on the Ensign disc and in the booklet with full credits.

== Personnel ==
The cover displays some of the contributors. From left to right, back to front, are: Jake Kennedy (crew), Colin Blakey, Pat McCarthy (recording engineer), Jimmy Hickey (crew), John Dunford (co-producer), Trevor Hutchinson, Fran Breen, Anthony Thistlethwaite, Mike Scott, and Steve Wickham.

- Mike Scott — vocals, guitar, piano, Hammond organ, drums, bouzouki
- Anthony Thistlethwaite — saxophone, mandolin, harmonica, Hammond organ
- Steve Wickham — violin
- Trevor Hutchinson — bass guitar, double bass
- Roddy Lorimer — trumpet
- Kevin Wilkinson — drums
- Peter McKinney — drums
- Dave Ruffy — drums
- Colin Blakey — piano, flute, border horn
- Fran Breen — drums
- Vinnie Kilduff — guitar
- Noel Bridgeman — tambourine, congas
- Jay Dee Daugherty — drums
- Máirtín O'Connor — accordion
- Alec Finn — bouzouki
- Charlie Lennon — violin
- Brendan O'Regan — bouzouki
- Tomás Mac Eoin — vocals
- Paraig Stevens — bells
- Jenny Haan — vocals
- Ruth Nolan — vocals
- Rachel Nolan — vocals
- The Abergavenny Male Voice Choir — vocals

== Charts ==
Chart (1988–1989)	Peak position
Australian Albums (ARIA)	64
New Zealand Albums (RMNZ)	15
Norwegian Albums (VG-lista)	7
Swedish Albums (Sverigetopplistan)	18
UK Albums (Official Charts)	13
US Billboard 200	76

== Certifications ==
Region	Certification	Certified units/sales
Ireland (IRMA)	Gold	20,000
United Kingdom (BPI)	Gold	100,000^{^}
^{^} Shipments figures based on certification alone.
