= 34 Hours =

Studio album by Skid Row
- Released: June 1971
- Genre: Blues rock, hard rock
- Label: CBS (Europe); Epic (US and Japan)
- Producer: Clifford Davis

Skid Row chronology
| Skid (1970) | 34 Hours (1971) |

Professional ratings
Review scores
| Source | Rating |
|---|---|
| AllMusic | 4/5 stars |
| Collector's Guide to Heavy Metal | 9/10 |

34 Hours is a 1971 album by Irish blues-rock band Skid Row. It was the band's second album, and takes its title from the fact that it was recorded in 34 hours.

== Track listing ==
Side I

1. "Night of the Warm Witch" (Brendan "Brush" Shiels, Gary Moore, Noel "Nollaig" Bridgeman) – 9:04
  - including "The Following Morning"
2. "First Thing in the Morning" (Shiels, Moore, Bridgeman) – 1:55
  - including "Last Thing at Night"
3. "Mar" (Shiels) – 6:33

Side II

1. "Go, I'm Never Gonna Let You, Pt. 1" (Shiels) – 8:50
  - including "Go, I'm Never Gonna Let You, Pt.2"
2. "Lonesome Still" (Shiels, Moore, Bridgeman) – 3:50
3. "Love Story, Pt. 1" (Shiels, Moore, Bridgeman) – 5:07
  - including "Love Story, Pt. 2"
  - including "Love Story, Pt. 3"
  - including "Love Story, Pt. 4"

== Personnel ==
Skid Row

- Brush Shiels – lead vocals, bass guitar, guitar
- Gary Moore – lead guitar, vocals
- Noel Bridgeman – drums, background vocals

Additional musicians

- Paul Scully – bass guitar on "Mar"

Production

- Clifford Davis – producer
- Martin Birch – engineer
