= Universal Hall =

Studio album by the Waterboys
- Released: 9 June 2003
- Recorded: January – February 2003 at Findhorn Foundation, Scotland
- Genre: Folk rock
- Length: 43:58
- Label: Puck
- Producer: Mike Scott

The Waterboys chronology
Fisherman's Blues, Part 2 (2002)	Universal Hall (2003)	Karma to Burn (2005)

Professional ratings
Review scores
Source	Rating
AllMusic	link
The Guardian	4/5 stars

Universal Hall is the eighth studio album by the Waterboys, released in 2003. It is named after the theatre and performance hall at the Findhorn Foundation, which is pictured on the album cover. The album shows much more influence from folk music than its predecessor, A Rock in the Weary Land. It is the first Waterboys album to feature Steve Wickham since Room to Roam, and therefore the first Waterboys album with all three core members of the post-reunion band.

Mike Scott describes the album as a "record containing one Irish reel and eleven spiritual songs that articulate - to the best of my ability - the vision that drives, challenges, sustains and transforms me". The cover was designed by art director Steve Manson.

James Christopher Monger, writing for Allmusic, describes "Every Breath Is Yours" as "simplified", and "Nick Drake-cloned". Scott thanks Liebe Pugh for the song.

"Seek the Light" is unique amongst Waterboys recordings for borrowing heavily from contemporary dance music, specifically electronica. It includes part of the song "Etheric Currents" from the album Cosmic Breath, by May East and Craig Gibsone, both of whom also appear on "Seek the Light". East plays an instrument, the sandawa, which the album's recording notes claims "reproduces the frequency of the speed of light".

"The Dance at the Crossroads" is the "one Irish reel" mentioned by Scott. It is a short instrumental written by Wickham, who performs the song on fiddle. Scott plays both tambron and rotosphere, while Naiff plays piano and flute.

== Track listing ==
Tracks written by Mike Scott, except as noted.

Universal Hall track listing
No.	Title	Writer(s)	Length
1.	"This Light Is for the World"		3:31
2.	"The Christ in You"		3:18
3.	"Silent Fellowship"		4:59
4.	"Every Breath Is Yours"		4:28
5.	"Peace of Iona"		6:13
6.	"Ain't No Words for the Things I'm Feeling"		2:32
7.	"Seek the Light"	May East, Craig Gibsone, Scott	2:37
8.	"I've Lived Here Before"	Liam Ó Maonlaí, Scott	3:08
9.	"Always Dancing, Never Getting Tired"		3:16
10.	"The Dance at the Crossroads" (instrumental)	Steve Wickham	1:13
11.	"E.B.O.L."		2:15
12.	"Universal Hall"	Scott, Wickham	6:23

== Personnel ==
- Mike Scott – vocals (all tracks but 10), guitar (tracks 1, 3–6, 9, 12), bass (track 1, 3, 5, 7, 9), piano (track 1–4, 8, 9), loops (track 1, 3, 5), acoustic guitar (track 2) harmonium (track 3, 9), electric piano (track 5, 12), organ (track 6, 11), keyboards, synthesizer (track 7, 9, 12), hand drum, tambourine (track 9, 10), 12-string guitar, crystal guitar (track 11)
- Steve Wickham – fiddle (track 1, 2, 5, 9, 10, 12), orchestra (track 1, 12), bass (track 7)
- Scott Gamble – djembe, djoon djoon (track 1), hand drum (track 4)
- Chris Madden – loops (track 1, 3), tambourine (track 3)
- Richard Naiff – flute (track 5, 10), piano (track 6, 10, 12)
- Finlay Grant – drums (track 5)
- Craig Gibsone – didjeridoo (track 7)
- May East – sandawa (track 7)

== Ballet music ==
In 2007 British choreographer Christopher Bruce created a new work for the ballettmainz of the German Staatstheater Mainz using six songs from this album. The ballet premiered on 8 November 2007 in Mainz.

Order of the songs:

1. I've Lived Here Before
2. Always Dancing, Never Getting Tired
3. Peace of Iona
4. Seek the Light
5. The Christ in You
6. The Dance at the Crossroads

== Charts ==
Chart (2003)	Peak position
Norwegian Albums Chart	24
UK Albums Chart	74

== Notes ==
1. "Mike Scott, March 2003". Archived from the original on 23 October 2004.
2. "Review of Universal Hall". Allmusic.
3. Scott, Mike (2003). "Recording Notes". Universal Hall. Puck Records. pp. 11–13.
4. "ballettmainz PROGRAMM XXV". Staatstheater Mainz. Archived from the original on December 2, 2007.
