= The Return of Pan =

1993 single by the Waterboys

Single by the Waterboys

from the album Dream Harder
- B-side: "Karma"
- Released: 3 May 1993
- Length: 4:19
- Label: Geffen
- Songwriter: Mike Scott
- Producers: Mike Scott; Bill Price

The Waterboys singles chronology
"Fisherman's Blues" (1991)	"The Return of Pan" (1993)	"Glastonbury Song" (1993)

"The Return of Pan" is a song by British band the Waterboys, released in May 1993 by Geffen Records as the lead single from their sixth studio album, Dream Harder (1993). It was written by Mike Scott, and produced by Scott and Bill Price. The song reached No. 24 in the UK Singles Chart and No. 10 on the US Billboard Modern Rock Tracks chart.

== Background ==
"The Return of Pan" is the Waterboys' second ode to the Greek deity, following "The Pan Within", a track from their third studio album This Is the Sea (1985). Speaking of the musical similarities between the two songs, Scott told NME in 1993, "It's the same chord sequence, and those chords signify 'Pan' to me."

Speaking of the song's lyrical influence, Scott revealed to NME in 1993, "He's a really great guy, yeah, but everybody's got a bit of Pan in them, and it's all about finding the Pan in yourself. Pan is wildness, freedom, the natural world, a sense of abandonment – the very opposite, really, of modern urban living. I'm non-denominational, but I'm interested in all religions. I believe there's one creator, but there are gods for different aspects of creation, and Pan represents a particular aspect." In 1996, Scott described the song as "mischievous".

== Release ==
The 12-inch and CD formats of the single included an acoustic demo version of "The Return of Pan", recorded in Scott's front room, as a hidden fourth track.

== Critical reception ==
Upon its release as a single, Everett True of Melody Maker noted that "The Return of Pan" "possesses a certain windswept epic feel that I figured Mike Scott had lost after This Is the Sea". He added, "I'm not saying I actively enjoy Bill Price's BMP production, I'm not saying this isn't anything but an ordinary-to-good song buoyed up by bracing guitars... but hell. This isn't too bad at all." The Accrington Observer awarded the single a five out of five star rating. The reviewer described the "typically majestic track" as a "a much slower version" of the band's 1985 track "The Pan Within" from This Is the Sea and added that it "is arguably the best single of the year so far".

George Byrne of the Irish Independent criticised the track for "sounding for all the world like a Chris de Burgh song played with a middling degree of urgency". He added, "It's 1993 and Mike Scott is singing about ancient gods with cloven hooves... not even the crusties will fall for that." Johnny Dee of NME was also negative in his review, calling it "fraggle cack from the bowels of Hippyhell".

In the US, Larry Flick of Billboard described the song as a "tough, well-produced track that neatly balances raucous electric guitars with the Celtic folk the band has long made a specialty". Randy Clark of Cash Box wrote, "This single from the upcoming Waterboys album could have just as easily appeared on an Al Stewart record. Just add a bigger beat and a lengthy, screaming guitar solo."

In a review of Dream Harder, CD Review commented, "'The Return of Pan' finds [Scott] singing about mythological gods and although romanticism is neat stuff, it's most effective when shaded with a touch of reality." Audio noted the song "point[s] to Scott's fondness for other kinds of supreme beings".

== Music video ==
The song's music video was directed by Jeff Stein and features Carla Azar on drums. It was the Waterboys' first video since 1985's "The Whole of the Moon" and Scott's debut video for Geffen Records. Scott had previously refused to shoot videos for most of the Waterboys' singles. He considered the medium to taint the listener's relationship with a song and spoil their imagination of it by presenting imagery that was often "shallow and moronic". By 1993, he decided to give making videos a try again to maximise the potential of the new material reaching a big audience.

Prior to shooting any video for Geffen, Scott received some training from the acting teacher and theatre director Stephen Jobes on how to present himself in front of a camera and remain composed in front of a film crew. Meanwhile, a number of directors drew up their ideas for videos for "The Return of Pan", but Scott rejected all of the ideas for either being clichéd or misinterpreting the song. Geffen eventually suggested the director Jeff Stein and after Scott met him in a coffee shop along Sixth Avenue, he agreed for him to direct the video for "The Return of Pan".

Scott wished to control the vision for the video to "ensure [it] conformed to my sense of the song" and did not misinterpret it with an "irrelevant storyline". Stein obliged with Scott's suggestion of a performance-based video with Scott sitting down performing the song with a gold guitar, the concept of which was based on a photograph taken for the Dream Harder sleeve. Scott also suggested featuring some goats in the video, but the resulting footage presented them as "goofy, like wacky pets at a children's zoo" rather than "wild and Pan-like". The final sequence, featuring Scott surrounded by goats and with his guitar raised over his head, was shot at The Palisades of the lower Hudson River. Scott recalled in his autobiography of seeing the final result, "I realised the folly of controlling the content myself; though the video was well shot by Jeff it was stiff and kooky, a thousand miles from the intent of the song".

== Formats ==
7-inch and cassette single
No.	Title	Length
1.	"The Return of Pan" (LP version)	4:19
2.	"Karma"	2:47

12-inch and CD single
No.	Title	Length
1.	"The Return of Pan" (LP version)	4:19
2.	"Karma"	2:47
3.	"Mister Powers"	7:00
4.	"The Return of Pan" (demo version, hidden track)	1:14

== Personnel ==
- Mike Scott – vocals, lead guitar, rhythm guitar, keyboard, percussion
- Chris Bruce – lead guitar, rhythm guitar
- Scott Thunes – bass
- Carla Azar – drums
- George Stathos – Greek clarinet on "The Return of Pan"
- Sugar Blue – harmonica on "Karma"

Production

- Mike Scott – producer of "The Return of Pan", "Karma" and "Mister Powers"
- Bill Price – producer, recording and mixing on "The Return of Pan" and "Karma"
- Niko Bolas – recording and mixing on "Mister Powers"

Other

- Matt Mahurin – illustration
- Frank Olinsky – art direction

== Charts ==
Chart (1993)	Peak position
Australia (ARIA)	127
Canada Top Singles (RPM)	64
Europe (Eurochart Hot 100)	89
Europe (European Hit Radio)	34
Ireland (IRMA)	28
Portugal (AFP)	10
UK Singles (Official Charts)	24
UK Airplay (Music Week)	26
US Alternative Airplay (Billboard)	10
