= Vinnie Kilduff =

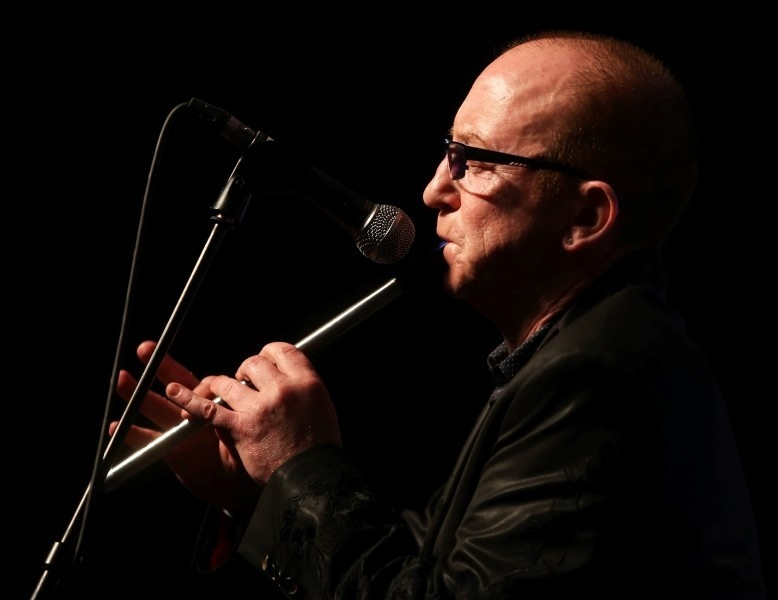
- Vinnie performing at the EBN Congress, Derry 2013

Background information
- Born: 10 August 1960 (age 64); Mayo, Ireland
- Genres: Folk; celtic; rock; world
- Occupations: Singer-songwriter; musician; producer; film editor
- Instruments: Whistle; uilleann pipes; guitar; mandolin; vocals; piano; harmonica; bodhrán; flute
- Years active: 1980–present
- Website: vinniekilduff.com

Vinnie Kilduff (born 10 August 1960) is an Irish multi-instrumentalist and singer-songwriter, primarily known for his work with U2, The Waterboys, Clannad and Sinéad O'Connor. He plays whistle, uilleann pipes, guitar, mandolin, piano, harmonica, bodhrán and flute. He is described as one of Ireland's best known contemporary whistle players.

== Early life ==
Kilduff was born in Knock, County Mayo, Ireland to parents Sheila and Jim. His mother was from Killorglin County Kerry. His father was a talented fiddle and whistle player. Having mastered the whistle by the age of six, the young Kilduff competed in numerous traditional Irish music competitions known as Fleadh Cheoil. In 1978, he began to study music in the Chatham Row College of Music in Dublin.

== Musical career – guest artist ==
=== U2 ===
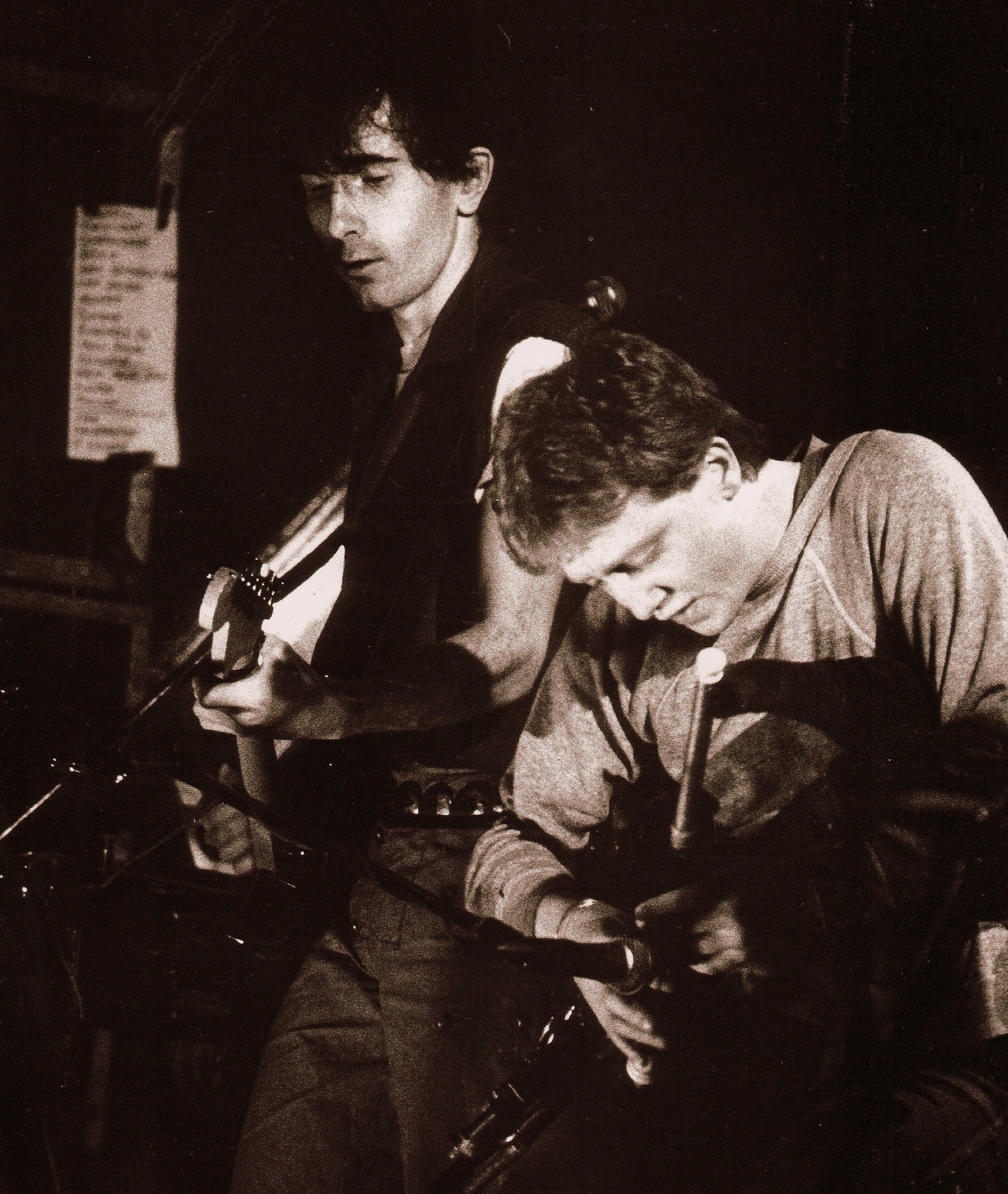
Kilduff performing with U2 during their War Tour in 1983 at the RDS Dublin

In 1981, Kilduff was asked by U2 to play uilleann pipes and bodhrán on their album October and to guest with them at their concert in Slane Castle that year. In 1983, Kilduff rejoined U2 for their promotional tour of the album War. In 2009, the U2 song "Tomorrow" with Kilduff playing the uilleann pipes was featured in It Might Get Loud, the Davis Guggenheim documentary on the electric guitar from the point of view of Jimmy Page, The Edge and Jack White.

=== The Waterboys ===
In 1988 Kilduff was invited by Mike Scott to join the Waterboys for the recording of their Fisherman's Blues album. Kilduff played guitar, uilleann pipes, and whistle, as well as co-producing several tracks on the album. Kilduff continued to tour with the Waterboys between 1988 and 1990.

=== Clannad ===
In 1990 Kilduff joined the Irish folk band Clannad for the recording of their album Anam. He continued to record and tour with the band throughout the 1990s. He featured on their 1996 album Lore, the 1998 Landmarks which received the 1999 Grammy Award for Best New Age Album and their 2005 release Live in Concert.

=== Sinéad O'Connor ===
Kilduff played mandolin, low whistle and whistle on singer-songwriter Sinéad O'Connor's DVD and CD set Theology – Live at the Sugar Club, a recording of a live concert performance in The Sugar Club, Dublin on 8 November 2006.

=== In Tua Nua ===
In 1982 along with Steve Wickham and others, Kilduff was a founder member of Irish rock band In Tua Nua. The band have been credited with discovering the then fifteen-year-old singer Sinead O'Connor at this time, who temporarily joined them as lead vocalist and co-wrote the song "Take My Hand". They were the first band to sign with U2's Mother record label on which they released their first single "Coming Thru". In 1984 they were signed by Island Records and supported Bob Dylan at his Slane Castle concert in July the same year. They released two further singles before Kilduff left the band in 1986.

=== The Rocking Chairs ===
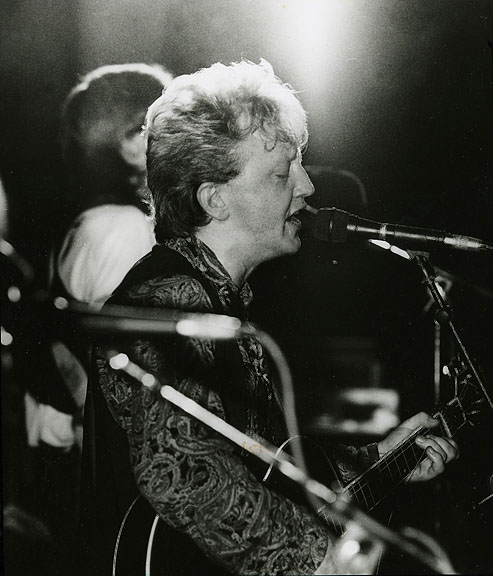
Kilduff performing with his Band The Rocking Chairs in 1989

In 1989 Kilduff formed his own rock band The Rocking Chairs, along with Conor Brady, Gerry O'Connor, Derek Kennedy and Peter McKinney. They released one single, "Stuck in the Driving Rain". In 1997 they collaborated with actor Patrick Bergin on two songs at the Gathering, a concert to commemorate the 150th anniversary of the Irish Famine in Millstreet, County Cork, Ireland. In 2010 Bergin released one of the songs "My Angel" as a single, with Kilduff playing tin whistle and as producer.

=== Patrick Cassidy's Famine Remembrance ===
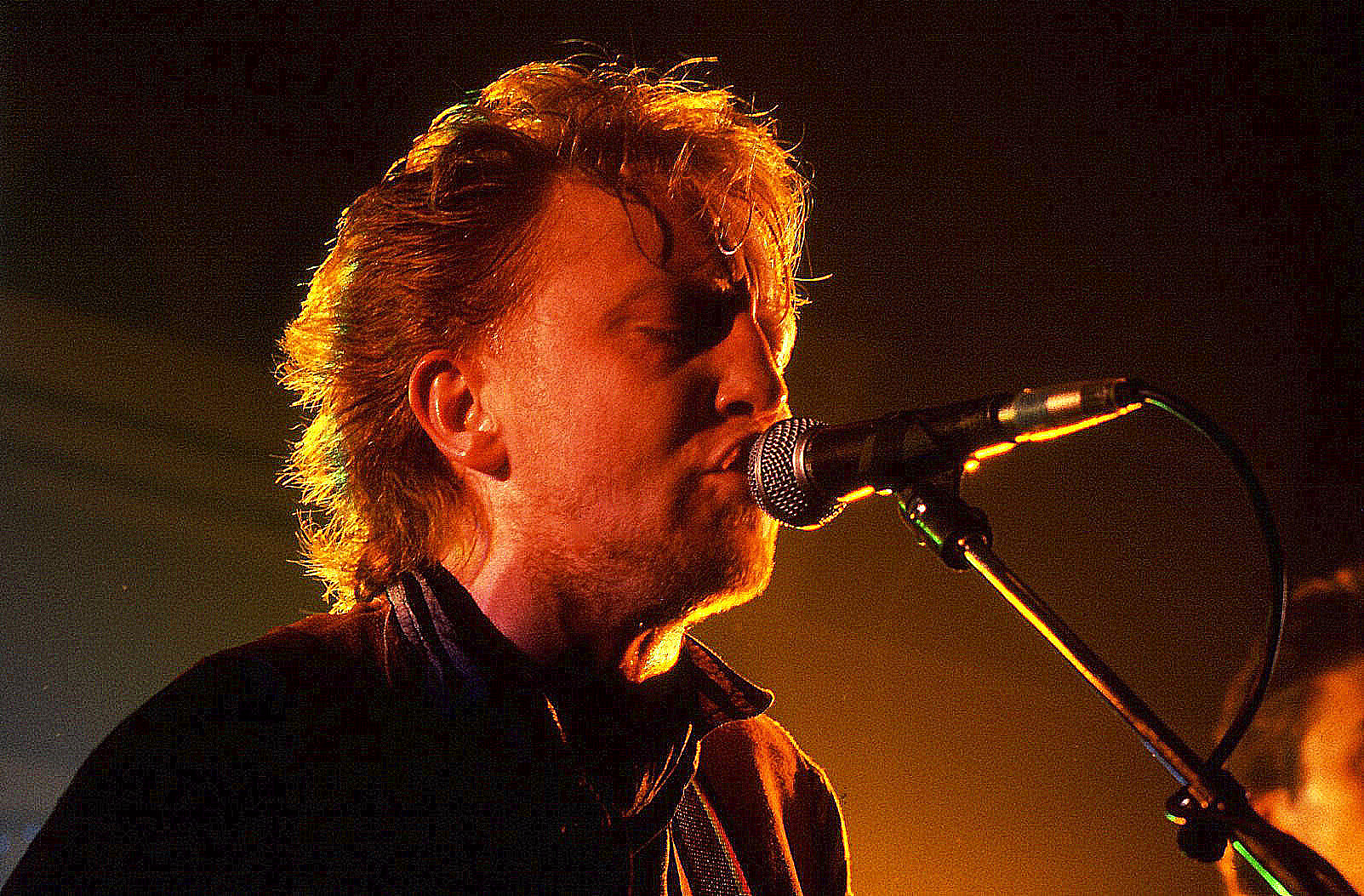
Kilduff performing in Dublin 1990

In 1996 Kilduff played uilleann pipes as a soloist on composer Patrick Cassidy's Famine Remembrance, a piece commissioned to commemorate the 150th anniversary of the Irish Famine. It was premiered in New York's St. Patrick's Cathedral and a CD was released the following year.

== Solo career ==
In 1990 Kilduff released his first solo traditional album The Boys From The Blue Hill. It was nominated by Rolling Stone Magazine for 'Folk Album of the Year'.

== Film, TV and documentary ==
Kilduff has worked on various film and TV productions in both a production and music-writing role. In 1985 he composed music for the film James Joyce's Women starring Fionnula Flanagan. In 2009 he had a guest role in the Irish-American film This is My Father, starring James Caan and Aidan Quinn. He also appears on the soundtrack of the movie.

=== Selected filmography ===
- Hands (1981,RTÉ series, Film Editor, Music)
- Patterns (1982, RTÉ series, Film Editor, Music)
- The Outcasts (1983, Assistant Film Editor, Music)
- James Joyce's Women (1985, Film Editor, Music)
- The Doctor and The Devils (1985, Music)
- Broken Harvest (1994, Music)
- The Gathering – a Celebration of Irish Culture and Tradition (1997, featured artist)
- This is my Father (1999, Guest Role)
- Learn to Play the Tin Whistle – DVD (2006, Waltons)
- It Might Get Loud (2009)

== Music production ==
Kilduff has worked with many of the leading names in the Music business including U2, Clannad, Sinead O'Connor, The Waterboys, Steve Cooney, Charlie Lennon, Ciaran Brennan, Arty McGlynn and with Newry rock band The 4 of Us.

=== Selected discography ===
- U2, October 1981.
- General Humbert II, 1982.
- In Tua Nua, Coming Through, 1984.
- In Tua Nua, Take My Hand, 1984.
- In Tua Nua, Somebody to Love, 1985.
- The Waterboys, Fisherman's Blues, 1985.
- The Rocking Chairs, Stuck in the Driving Rain, 1989.
- Vinnie Kilduff, The Boys from the Blue Hill, 1990.
- The Waterboys, The Best of the Waterboys, 1991.
- Fisherstreet, Out in the Night, 1992.
- Clannad, Anam, 1992.
- Brendan O'Regan, A Wind of Change, 1993.
- Seán Smyth, The Blue Fiddle, 1993.
- Charlie Lennon, Island Wedding, 1994.
- Anthony Thistlethwaite, Cartwheels, 1994.
- Various Artists, Ceol Tig Neachtain, 1995.
- Clannad, Lore, 1996.
- Patrick Cassidy, Famine Remembrance, 1997.
- Hazel O'Connor, 5 in the Morning, 1998.
- The Waterboys, The Whole of the Moon, 1998.
- Clannad, Landmarks, 1998.
- Gerry O'Connor, Myriad, 1999.
- The 4 of Us, Change, 1999.
- The 4 of Us, Classified Personal, 1999.
- Various Artists, This Is My Father soundtrack, 1999.
- The Waterboys, Too Close to Heaven, 2001.
- The Waterboys, Fisherman's Blues Part II, 2002.
- Clannad Live in Concert, 2005.
- Various Artists, The Aran Lifeboat Collection, 2006.
- U2, October Delux Remastered Edition, 2008.
- JHall, The Real World, 2008.
- Various Artists, Eistigí, 2009.
- U2, Collector's Box Set 1977–1984, 2009
- The Waterboys, Fisherman's Box, 2013.
