= Tomás Mac Eoin =

- Born: 1937 (age 88–89); An Cheathru Rua, Ireland
- Genres: Sean-nós
- Occupations: Farmer, writer, composer
- Awards: Best sean-nós singer in Ireland in 1967 at the Oireachtas competitions and won Corn Uí Riada

Tomás Mac Eoin (born 1937) is an Irish sean-nós singer, actor, songwriter and poet. Also known as Tomás McKeown, he is from An Bóthar Buí in An Cheathrú Rua, Conamara, Galway, Ireland.

Known for his old-style or sean-nós singing, he was voted the best sean-nós singer in Ireland in 1967 at the Oireachtas competitions and won Corn Uí Riada. He appeared on The Waterboys's Fisherman's Blues album (1988).

He was a regular singer on RTÉ Raidió na Gaeltachta and also performed on The Late Late Show several times. Some of his best known material include:

- The Stolen Child ** (William Butler Yeats / Tomás Mac Eoin / Mike Scott)
- An Cailín Álainn
- Bleán na Bó
- Amhrán an Bhingó
- An Rock an' Roll
