= Room to Roam =

Studio album by the Waterboys
- Released: 17 September 1990
- Recorded: February—June 1990
- Studio: Spiddal House, County Galway, Ireland
- Genre: Folk rock; Celtic rock
- Length: 41:21
- Label: Ensign; Chrysalis
- Producer: Barry Beckett; Mike Scott

The Waterboys chronology
Fisherman's Blues (1988)	Room to Roam (1990)	Dream Harder (1993)

Singles from Room to Roam
- 1. "How Long Will I Love You?" Released: November 1990; 2. "A Man Is in Love" Released: February 1991

Professional ratings
Review scores
Source	Rating
AllMusic	4/5 stars
Entertainment Weekly	C+
New Musical Express	5/10
Record Mirror	4/5 stars
Rolling Stone	4/5 stars
Select	4/5 stars

Room to Roam is the fifth studio album by the Waterboys, released by Ensign Records on 17 September 1990 in the United Kingdom. It continued the folk rock sound of 1988's Fisherman's Blues, but was less of a commercial success, reaching #180 on the Billboard Top 200 after its release there in October 1990. Critical response continues to be mixed. AllMusic describes it both as "not quite as [musically] successful" as Fisherman's Blues, but also as a "Celtic rock classic". The front and back covers were designed by Simon Fowler based upon photography by Stefano Giovannini and Sean Jackson.

Room to Roam is named after a passage in a George MacDonald book, Phantastes. The cover photography was done by Simon Fowler, and designed by Anni Siggins.

The album was recorded at Spiddal House in Galway, where parts of Fisherman's Blues had been recorded.Room to Roam would be the last of the Waterboys' folk-rock sound until the release of Universal Hall in 2003. Fiddler Steve Wickham, who had been a large inspiration for the change to that sound for Fisherman's Blues, left the band shortly before Room to Roam was released. The Waterboys briefly toured with a sound more akin to their early "Big Music" rock sound, before disbanding. Room to Roam was remastered in 2008 and released with a bonus disc of additional tracks from the original sessions.

Following the box set of outtakes and bonus songs of the Fisherman's Blues sessions, assembled in the Fisherman's Box, Mike Scott produced a box set of material from the 1989-1990 recording sessions in Spiddal. The 6-CD set (5 CDs and 1 DVD) were issued as The Magnificent Seven - The Waterboys Fisherman's Blues/Room to Roam Band 1989-90 in late 2021. The box set contained 103 songs, many of them previously unreleased.

== Background ==
Upon its release, Room to Roam was considered something of a commercial and critical disappointment. Speaking of the album to Melody Maker in 1991, Scott said, "Room to Roam is my favourite album. Everything I was trying to say is on that album. I was disappointed it got received the way it did. I like it a lot. If you listen to it in terms of the first four Waterboys albums, it falls down, but if you listen to it on its own terms, it stands up high." In a 1993 interview with the same magazine, Scott continued to defend the album, commenting, "Of all my records, if I put it on I have to listen to the whole thing all the way through. Maybe I'm just the only guy who actually understands the record." He did, however, express regret that the songs were not recorded live in the studio; a lot of overdubbing was used in the recording process. He also felt that some of the songs, although "good", suffered from the "wrong arrangements" and also felt the album's running order was a mistake, stating, "I wish the album had started with the first three songs on side two. If the album had opened with 'Islandman', it would have had a lot more punch to it and maybe made more sense to people."

== Songs ==
"A Life of Sundays", which was more of a rock music song than the rest of the album's tracks and contained a small part of Yellow Submarine, reached #15 on Billboard's Modern Rock singles chart.

"Islandman" anthropomorphises Great Britain and Ireland as the speaker describes locations from these places as parts of the human body. The lyrics offer some comments about the places that Scott had recently lived in the placements he chooses. "Scotland", he sings, "is my dreaming head / Ireland is my Heart", but "London sprawls across my rump".

"The Raggle Taggle Gypsy" is adapted from a traditional folk ballad, which, according to Nick Tosches, tells the story of a true 17th-century love affair. The song's appearance on Room to Roam led to renewed popularity, and it has since been recorded by other Irish-folk musicians, as well as by Carlos Núñez on Os Amores Libres in 1999 with Scott. The recording was also emblematic of the band's sound for Fisherman's Blues and Room to Roam, in the same fashion that the single "The Big Music" came to describe the group's sound for the first three albums. The official Waterboys website refers to the Waterboys during this period as the "Raggle Taggle band".

"How Long Will I Love You?" was released as a single in Ireland. On the 7-inch and cassette versions of the single, an alternative version of "When Will We Be Married", a traditional song that had appeared on Fisherman's Blues was the B-side. On the 12-inch and compact disc releases of the single were also a Ray Charles song, "Come Live with Me". The song's lyrics are a simple proclamation of undying love from the speaker; "How long will I love you? / As long as stars are above you / and longer if I can".

"Spring Comes to Spiddal" is an oddity compared to other Waterboys songs. The song, which refers to Spiddal, where much of Fisherman's Blues and all of Room to Roam were recorded, is arranged in a style that is a blend of folk music and New Orleans-style marching band music. The lyrics are a straightforward description of the town's inhabitants enjoying the season of spring.

The words "Further up, further in" are spoken by the character Aslan in The Last Battle by Christian fantasist C.S. Lewis, one of Scott's sources of inspiration. The lyrics describe a Joseph Campbell-style "hero's journey" to meet a king. Specifically, one verse describes travelling to the "end of the world" (which is a place, not a time in Waterboys lyrics) and meeting the king there, which is essentially the ending of Voyage of the Dawn Treader by Lewis. Another verse of the song describes a classic image of The Fool from the tarot.

The lyrics for "Room to Roam" are found in the books Lilith and Phantastes by the Scottish fantasist George MacDonald.

== Track listing ==
All songs by Mike Scott unless otherwise noted.

1. "In Search of a Rose" – 1:20
2. "Song from the End of the World" – 1:59
3. "A Man Is in Love" (Scott) / "Kaliope House" (Dave Richardson) – 3:18
4. "Bigger Picture" (Scott, Anthony Thistlethwaite) – 2:26
5. "Natural Bridge Blues" (Traditional, arranged by the Waterboys) – 2:06
6. "Something That Is Gone" – 3:16
7. "The Star and the Sea" – 0:26
8. "A Life of Sundays" – 6:14
9. "Islandman" – 2:06
10. "The Raggle Taggle Gypsy" (Traditional, arranged by the Waterboys) – 2:58
11. "How Long Will I Love You?" – 3:38
12. "Upon the Wind and Waves" (Steve Wickham) – 0:44
13. "Spring Comes to Spiddal" – 1:24
14. "The Trip to Broadford" (Kieran Donnellan) – 1:14
15. "Further Up, Further In" (Traditional, arranged by the Waterboys, words by Scott) – 5:19
16. "Room to Roam" (George MacDonald, arranged by the Waterboys) – 3:08
17. "The Kings of Kerry" (Scott, Sharon Shannon, Wickham) – 0:56

Notes: on the original 1990 CD, "Kaliope House" is listed in the booklet as a separate track on its own instead of as a coda to "A Man Is in Love" (but on the actual CD is part of track 3 as normal), so that the track number of the track list from 4 to the end is shifted by one unit. Also on the original CD, the coda to "How Long Will I Love You?" is inserted as part of the following song, "Upon the Wind and Waves". On a later release, "Kaliope House"' is the fourth track (both on the CD and on the liner), and "The Kings of Kerry'" is not listed on the liner, whose tracking thus also has 17 items. There's another nameless short track between "A Life of Sundays" and "Islandman", played with the violin only and not numbered separately.

=== Collector's Edition Bonus disk track list (2008) ===
All songs by Mike Scott unless otherwise noted.

1. "In Search of a Rose (full band)" – 2:29
2. "My Morag (The Exile's Dream)" – 2:12
3. "A Man is in Love (incl. Calliope House) (alternate)" – 3:20
4. "The Wyndy Wyndy Road" – 1:53
5. "Three Ships" – 3:22
6. "Sunny Sailor Boy" – 3:06
7. "Sponsored Pedal Pusher's Blues" – 2:50
8. "The Wayward Wind" – 3:48
9. "Danny Murphy / Florence" – 2:23
10. "The Raggle Taggle Gypsy (live)" – 4:31
11. "Custer's Blues (live)" – 4:37
12. "Twa Recruitin' Sergeants (live)" (Traditional) – 4:10
13. "A Reel and a Stomp in the Kitchen" – 0:52
14. "Down by the Sally Gardens" – 3:48
15. "A Strathspey in the Rain at Dawn" – 1:23
16. "A Song for the Life" – 3:49
17. "The Kings of Kerry (outdoor)" – 0:27

== Personnel ==
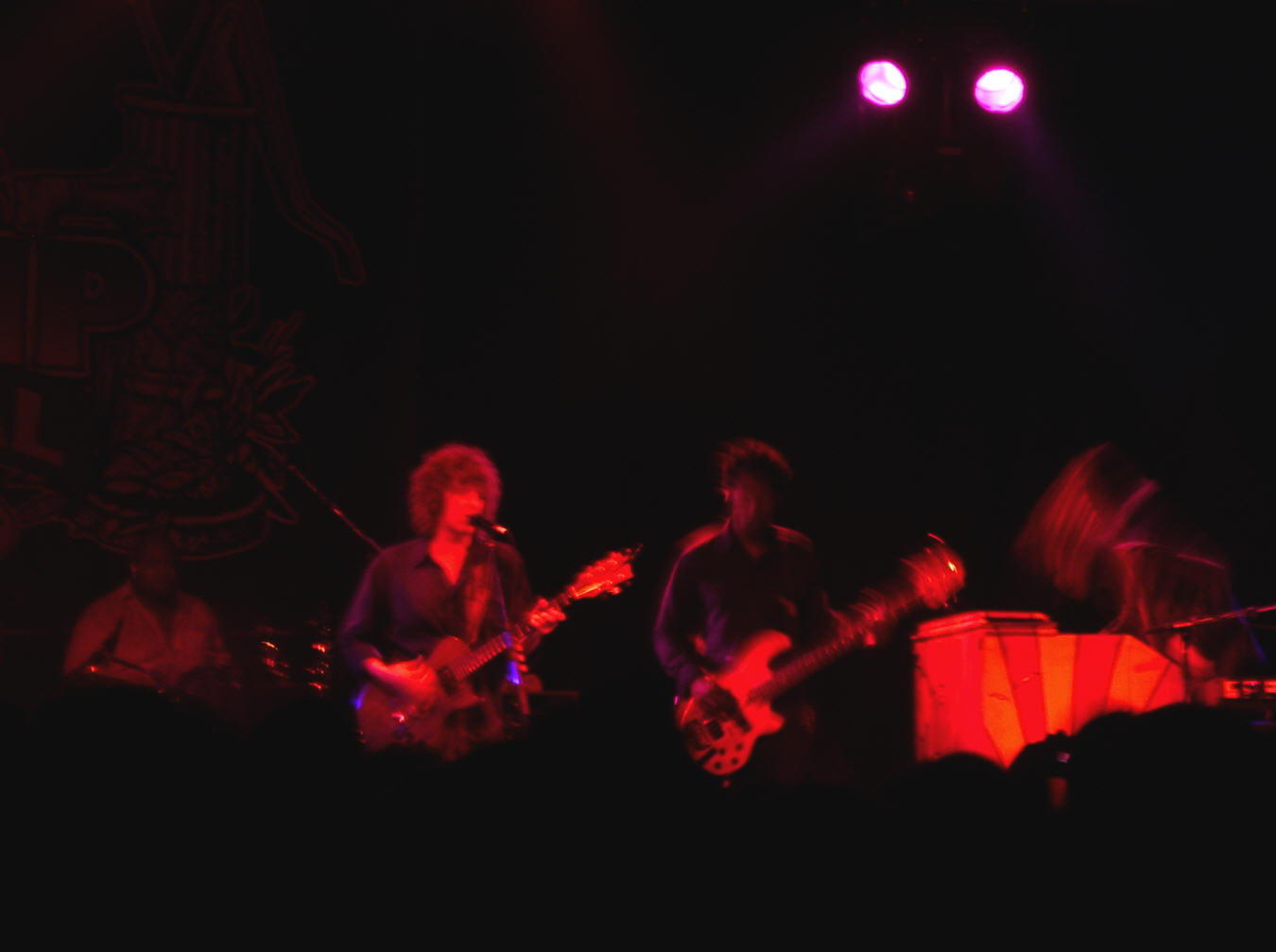
The Waterboys playing "The Raggle Taggle Gypsy" at the Trowbridge Festival in 2006.

The Waterboys

- Mike Scott – lead vocals, guitar, piano, mandolin
- Colin Blakey – whistle, flute, Hammond organ, piano
- Anthony Thistlethwaite – saxophone, mandolin
- Steve Wickham – fiddle, Hammond organ; vocals on "Upon the Wind And Waves"
- Sharon Shannon – accordion, fiddle
- Trevor Hutchinson – bass guitar, bouzouki
- Noel Bridgeman – drums, percussion; second vocals on "A Life of Sundays"

Additional personnel

- Roddy Lorimer – trumpet
- J. Neil Sidwell – trombone
- Kieran Wilde – clarinet
- Barry Beckett – piano on "Something that is Gone" and "How Long Will I Love You?"
- John "Turps" Burke – backing vocals
- Ken Samson – didjeridu
- Seamus Begley – backing vocals on "Room to Roam"
- Eileen Begley – backing vocals on "Room to Roam"
- Diarmuid O'Suilleabhan – backing vocals on "Room to Roam"

Technical

- Tim Martin – engineer
- Annie Siggins – sleeve design
- Simon Fowler – photography

== Charts ==
Chart (1990)	Peak position
Australian Albums (ARIA)	135
Dutch Albums Chart	69
Norwegian Albums Chart	11
Swedish Albums Chart	16
UK Albums Chart	5
US Billboard 200	180

== Notes and references ==
1. "Review of Room to Roam". Allmusic.
2. "Review of Universal Hall". Allmusic.
3. ^{a} Peter Anderson. "Mike Scott/Waterboys biography". Record Collector magazine. Archived from the original on 3 May 2005.
4. "iTunes album review". iTunes. Archived from the original on 8 November 2012.
5. Tosches, Nick (1996). Country: The Twisted Roots of Rock 'N' Roll. Da Capo Press. ISBN 0-306-80713-0.
