= Skid Row (Irish band) =

Irish blues rock band

- Origin: Dublin, Ireland
- Genres: Blues rock; hard rock
- Years active: 1967–1972; 1973–1979; 2012
- Label: CBS
- Past members: Brendan "Brush" Shiels; Phil Lynott; Bernard "Bernie" Cheevers; Noel "Nollaig" Bridgeman; Robbie Brennan; Gary Moore; Paul Chapman; Ed Deane; Eamonn Gibney; John Wilson; Kevin McAlea

Skid Row were an Irish blues rock band of the late 1960s and early 1970s, based in Dublin and fronted by bass guitarist Brendan "Brush" Shiels. It was the first band in which Phil Lynott and Gary Moore played professionally before finding greater fame with Thin Lizzy.

== History ==
=== Origins ===
The band was formed in August 1967, comprising Brendan 'Brush' Shiels on bass guitar, Noel 'Nollaig' Bridgeman on drums, Bernard "Ben" Cheevers on guitar, and Phil Lynott on vocals. Shiels and Cheevers had played together in a number of groups in Dublin before forming Skid Row. The band's first gig was in September 1967 in a basement club in Lower Abbey Street in Dublin 1. Cheevers left the band in September 1968 to continue working full-time in the electrical industry. Before his departure, the search for a suitably proficient guitarist resulted in Gary Moore joining the band as a fifth member. Moore and Cheevers both played in the band for a short 'hand-over' period. Robbie Brennan temporarily replaced original drummer Bridgeman until June 1969 and Cheevers was replaced by the 16-year-old Gary Moore in mid 1968, and the band recorded a single, "New Places, Old Faces" / "Misdemeanour Dream Felicity", for the Irish Song Records label (the only released recording of Lynott with Skid Row).

Later that year Shiels dropped Lynott from the line-up, converting Skid Row to a power trio by making himself the lead vocalist. By way of compensation, Shiels gave him a bass guitar he had bought from former musician Robert Ballagh for £49 in 1967 while with the Uptown Band, he taught Lynott to play bass and, after a stint with 'Orphanage', Lynott went on to international fame as founder, bassist and vocalist for Thin Lizzy. The band recorded a second single for 'Song', "Saturday Morning Man" / "Mervyn Aldridge". These two singles, plus three tracks from a BBC recording, were issued on the 'Hux' label as Live and on Song in April 2006. At the end of 2006 a number of Skid Row demo tapes featuring Phil Lynott were discovered. These were his earliest recordings (from 1968) and had been presumed lost for decades.

=== Skid and 34 Hours ===
With the returning Bridgeman, Skid Row played support to some of the great rock groups of the 1960s, including Fleetwood Mac in January 1970. Moore was influenced by the Fleetwood Mac guitarist Peter Green, who was in turn impressed by Moore's guitar playing and introduced him to the Columbia/CBS record company. A third single, "Sandie's Gone (Part 1)" / "Sandie's Gone (Part 2)", was released on the band's new label in April 1970, and a number of sessions and concerts were also recorded for the BBC during this period. The band released its first album Skid, in October 1970. A second LP, 34 Hours – so called because it took them a mere 34 hours to record it – was released in early 1971, preceded by the single "Night Of The Warm Witch" / "Mr. De-Luxe". Skid Row performed on the German TV music show Beat Club on 18 March 1971. There were short tours of Europe (October 1970, with Canned Heat) and of the USA (October/November 1970 and August and October 1971). A widely bootlegged show billed as "The Whiskey, Los Angeles, August 5, 1970", and featuring John Bonham as a guest, is more likely from August 1971. A third album was recorded in the autumn of 1971 but Moore left the band in December 1971 just before another planned US tour. He was temporarily replaced by Eric Bell (from Thin Lizzy) for some live appearances before Paul Chapman became the band's full-time guitarist. Moore later played with Thin Lizzy, replacing Eric Bell. Chapman overdubbed Moore's guitar tracks on the unreleased album but neither version was made public for almost twenty years. As the band faltered, Chapman left in July 1972 (later joining UFO). Shiels then teamed with drummer John Wilson (ex-Them, Taste and Stud) and future Sparks guitarist Adrian Fisher to form a band named simply 'Brush'.

=== Changing lineups ===
Skid Row reformed in Ireland in 1973, initially with Shiels, Wilson, singer Eamonn Gibney (ex-Alyce) and guitarist Ed Deane, later adding keyboard player Kevin McAlea. Gibney would later join Colm Wilkinson and Helen Jordan to sing as The Dajacs at the 1980 Irish final for the Eurovision Song Contest placing 7th. Shiels/Deane/Wilson line-up released the single "Dublin City Angels" / "Slow Down". John Wilson was replaced by Paddy Freeney before the band split again in early 1974. For the next few months Shiels played in the 'Bell-Brush Band' with Eric Bell and Timmy Creedon (drums, ex-Orphanage), sometimes joined by Eamonn Gibney. At the end of the year Shiels, Moore and Bridgeman briefly reunited for a series of gigs, and a 1975 line-up of Shiels (guitar/vocals), Bridgeman, Jimi Slevin (lead guitar/vocals, ex-Alyce, ex-Peggy's Leg) (born June 1950, Dublin), Timmy Creedon (second drummer/vocals) and Johann Brady (bass) recorded the Skid Row single "The Spanish Lady" / "Elvira". In 1976 Jody Pollard (guitar, ex-Elmer Fudd) replaced Pat O'Farrell in a line-up with Shiels (vocals/mandolin), Bridgeman (drums), John Brady (bass) and Dave Gaynor (drums), recording the Phil Lynott-produced double A-sided single "Coming Home Again" / "Fight Your Heart Out" and unreleased track "Skid Row Flashback". The 1976 double-disc live album of Rock n' Roll standards Alive And Kickin featured Shiels, Bridgeman, Brady, Pollard, Gaynor and Ian Anderson. In 1978 Pollard rejoined, this time replacing Eric Bell alongside Shiels, Bridgeman, Brady and Joe Staunton (guitar, ex-Orphanage).

=== Legacy ===
Skid Row had little commercial success outside Ireland and the UK, although Skid reached No.30 on the UK Albums Chart. More of their recorded material was released between 1990 and 2006.

Phil Lynott died of septicaemia in January 1986, John Brady was killed in a car accident on 15 February 1993, and Gary Moore died from a heart attack in February 2011. Noel Bridgeman went on to perform studio work with Clannad, The Waterboys and Altan and was part of Irish folk singer Mary Black's band in the late 1980s and early 1990s. He died in March 2021.

Shiels still occasionally performs as 'Brush Shiels' Skid Row', as recently as February 2005.

Brush Shiels returned to his Skid Row legacy once more releasing Mad Dog Woman (originally titled Skid Row Revisited) – an album of new material and re-recordings of Skid Row songs – through his website in June 2009. He also thanked the other Skid Row "for the generosity of spirit in acknowledging the contribution of the original Skid Row" by using the name. In January 2012 Shiels issued a public request to Jon Bon Jovi via YouTube to contact him about the use of the name 'Skid Row'. This was connected to Shiels having recently recovered the rights to his own songs recorded with the original Skid Row.

It was reported that in 1987, Jon Bon Jovi asked Gary Moore to sell the name 'Skid Row' to the American heavy metal band for $35,000 (Bon Jovi part-owns the music publishing rights of this band). Lead singer Sebastian Bach recalled,

When (Skid Row) got signed to Atlantic, Gary Moore heard about it and said we could have the name for $35,000 U.S. dollars. "We have to pay Gary Moore 35 grand to use the name," and so we, as a band, did buy the name from Gary Moore. We were all glad to do it because it is a great name for a band. I remember saying, "Wow, that's a lot of $, but we gotta do it!"

However, Shiels maintains that Moore simply referred the band to Shiels to discuss the rights to the name, but that it was never followed up.

They were managed in the 1970s by Oliver Byrne.

== Band members ==
- Brendan "Brush" Shiels – bass, vocals (1967–1972, 1973–1976, 2012)
- Noel "Nollaig" Bridgeman – drums (1967, 1969–1972, 1975–1976)
- Bernard "Bernie" Cheevers – guitars (1967)
- Phil Lynott – vocals (1967–1968)
- Gary Moore – guitars, vocals (1968–1971)
- Robbie Brennan – drums (1968)
- Eric Bell – guitars (1971)
- Paul Chapman – guitars (1971–1972)
- Eamonn Gibney – vocals (1973–1974)
- Ed Deane – guitars (1973–1974)
- John Wilson – drums (1973)
- Kevin McAlea – keyboards (1973–1974)
- Johann Braddy – bass (1975–1976)
- Paddy Freeney – drums (1974–1975)
- Timmy Creedon – drums (1975)
- Dave Gaynor – drums (1976)
- Jimi Slevin – guitars (1975)
- Pat O'Farrell – guitars (1976)
- Jody Polland – guitars (1976)

== Discography ==
=== Albums ===
- Skid Row (CBS, May 1970) – a.k.a. Dublin Gas Comy. (text on cover photo)
- Skid (CBS, November 1970) – Reached No.30 in the UK Album Chart
- 34 Hours (CBS, 1971)
- Alive and Kicking (Release Records, June 1976)
- Skid Row (Essential Records, 1990) – a.k.a. Gary Moore/Brush Shiels/Noel Bridgeman (artist credited on cover & spine), this is the Gary Moore version of the unreleased third album, recorded late 1971.
- Live and on Song (Hux, 2006) – Compilation: includes both sides of Skid Row's first two singles on the 'Song' label recorded 1969, plus a BBC 'In Concert' recording from 1971
- Bon Jovi Never Rang Me (Bruised Records, 2012)

=== Singles ===
- "New Places, Old Faces" / "Misdemeanour Dream Felicity" (Song, 1969)
- "Saturday Morning Man" / "Mervyn Aldridge" (Song, 1969)
- "Sandy's Gone (Part 1)" / "Sandy's Gone (Part 2)" (CBS, April 1970)
- "Night of the Warm Witch" / "Mr. De-Luxe" (CBS, April 1971)
- "Living One Day at a Time" / "Girl from Dublin City" (CBS, February 1972)
- "Dublin City Girls" / "Slow Down" (Hawk, 1973)
- "The Spanish Lady" / "Elvira" (Dude Records, 1975)
- "Coming Home Again" / "Fight Your Heart Out" (1976)
- "House of the Rising Sun" / "Buckfast Tonic" / "Let It Roll" (1981)
- "Mr. Diablo" / "Bring Them Back Alive" (Bruised Records, 1987)
- "Comin' Home Again" / "Flight of Earls" (Bruised Records, 1990)
