= Brush Shiels =

Irish musician (born 1945)

- Born: Brendan Francis Shiels; 24 October 1945 (age 81); Phibsborough, Dublin, Ireland
- Genres: Psychedelic rock, rock, blues rock, country
- Instruments: Guitar, bass, vocals
- Years active: 1960s–present
- Label: CBS
- Website: myspace.com/brushshiels

Brendan Francis "Brush" Shiels (born 24 October 1945) is an Irish musician best known for being the frontman of Gary Moore's first rock band, Skid Row. He had a show on RTÉ Television called Off yer Brush and was twice managed by boyband mentor Louis Walsh. He appears regularly, providing musical accompaniment, on the Joe Duffy Liveline radio programme on RTÉ and still performs live in Ireland.

Shiels played football for Bohemian Football Club in the 1960s. He has helped Bohemians by making appearances at fundraising events to try to ensure the survival of his former club.

In 1971, Billboard praised Shiels, Bridgeman, and Moore for their album 34 Hours suggesting the "lads will travel far". Shiels has played at such American music venues as Fillmore West in San Francisco and Whisky a Go Go in Los Angeles, and in 1986 he played at the Self Aid benefit concert for unemployed people in Ireland.

In October 2012, he suffered heart failure caused by a viral infection and was admitted to Connolly Hospital in Blanchardstown, Dublin for two weeks. In 2013, he was one of the legends from the Irish entertainment business to perform at the Philip Chevron testimonial.

== Discography ==
=== With Skid Row ===
- Skid Row (CBS, 1970)
- Skid (CBS, 1970)
- 34 Hours (CBS, 1971)
- Alive and Kicking (Release Records, 1976)
- Skid Row (a.k.a. Gary Moore/Brush Shiels/Noel Bridgeman) (Castle Classics, 1990)
- Live And On Song (Hux, 2006)
- Bon Jovi Never Rang Me (Bruised Records, 2012)

=== Solo ===
- Brush Shiels (Hawk, 1977)
- Old Pal (CMR, 1986)
- Fields of Athenry (Bruised Records, 1988)
- Bad Bob's Country Boogie (as "Brush Shiels & The Dublin Outlaws") (Bruised Records, 1990)
- Wrapped Silage (Tractor, 1994)
- Celtic Road Warrior (BUS Records, 1997)
- 18 Celtic Rock Classics (BUS Records, 1999)
- Mad Dog Woman originally titled Skid Row Revisited (Brush Music, 2009)
- A Brush With Life (Bruised Records, 2012)
