= Clannad: Live in Concert =

Live in Concert

Live album by Clannad
- Released: March 2005
- Recorded: 1996
- Genre: Irish
- Label: Koch

Clannad chronology
The Best of Clannad: In a Lifetime (2003)	Live in Concert (2005)	Clannad: Christ Church Cathedral (2012)

Professional ratings
Review scores
Source	Rating
Allmusic	3.5/5 stars

Live in Concert is a live album by the Irish folk group Clannad which was released in 2005. The album was compiled from concerts recorded during their 1996 European tour.

It features new versions of material from across the band's catalogue as far back as their 1973 debut album. Songs originally released in their simplest acoustic form are now performed here with brand new full band arrangements. "In a Lifetime" features a duet with former Riverdance singer Brian Kennedy.

An eleven-minute medley of music from the Robin of Sherwood TV series is notable for including previously unreleased music from the series that has yet to be released on any other Clannad album. These songs include "Royal" and "Action", and later in the tracklisting, "Dance".

The album was released as a free CD with the Irish Mail on Sunday newspaper on 17 October 2010 under the title The Collection. The CD omitted "Dance & Téidhir Abhaile Riú" and edited the "Robin of Sherwood Medley" from 11:22 to 4:00.

== Track listing ==
1. "Newgrange"
2. "An tÚll"
3. "Thíos Fán Chósta"
4. "In a Lifetime"
5. "Trail of Tears"
6. "Dúlamán"
7. "Theme from Harry's Game"
8. "Robin of Sherwood Medley: Robin (The Hooded Man) / Herne / Ancient Forest / Lady Marian / Royal / Action"
9. "Down by the Sally Gardens"
10. "Níl Sé'n Lá"
11. "Dance & Teidhir Abhaile Riú Medley: Dance / Luasc / Teidhir Abhaille"

== Personnel ==
=== Clannad ===
- Máire Brennan – harp, vocals
- Ciarán Brennan – acoustic guitar, bass guitar, vocals, keyboard, musical arrangement
- Pádraig Duggan – acoustic guitar, mandolin, vocals
- Noel Duggan – acoustic guitar, vocals

=== Other musicians ===
- Ian Parker – keyboards
- Ray Fean – percussion
- Deirdre Brennan – vocals, bodhran
- Ian Melrose – acoustic guitar, electric guitar
- Brian Kennedy – vocals
- Mel Collins – flute, saxophone
- Vinnie Kilduff – mandolin

=== Production ===
- Chris O'Brien and Graham Murphy – mixing
- Richard Dowling – mastering
- Gary Kelly – design
- Carmen Cordelia – cover photo
