= Glastonbury Song =

1993 single by the Waterboys

Single by the Waterboys

from the album Dream Harder
- B-side: "Chalice Hill"; "Burlington Bertie and Accrington Stanley"; "Corn Circle Symphony"
- Released: 12 July 1993
- Length: 3:42
- Label: Geffen
- Songwriter: Mike Scott
- Producers: Mike Scott; Bill Price

The Waterboys singles chronology
"The Return of Pan" (1993)	"Glastonbury Song" (1993)	"Preparing to Fly" (1993)

"Glastonbury Song" is a song by British band the Waterboys, released on 12 July 1993 by Geffen Records as the second single from their sixth studio album, Dream Harder (1993). It was written by Mike Scott and produced by Scott and Bill Price. The song reached number 29 on the UK Singles Chart and number 12 on the Irish Singles Chart. The accompanying music video was directed by John Downer.

== Background ==
Scott wrote "Glastonbury Song" in 1991 at his residence in Hudson Street, Manhattan using a Roland FP-8 and electric piano. Scott recalled on a Sodajerker podcast in 2015, "I had just bought the Roland keyboard and it had a couple of really nice sounds on it. It had the 'breathy' one which was the voice or choral sound, and it had a string one which is also used on the song."

"Glastonbury Song" was inspired by the town in Somerset, England. Scott told Rolling Stone in 1993, "It's almost like a place to go on a pilgrimage, a holy, sacred place. It's inspiring to be there." He expanded in an interview with NME, "Glastonbury's a holy centre, a place of great spiritual power, and there are lots of spiritual legends associated with it, among them that Jesus came here when he was a boy. And Joseph of Arimathea – Jesus' uncle – brought the chalice, in which he'd collected Jesus' blood from the cross, and he buried it at Glastonbury and that's the legend of the Holy Grail. And when you go there, the place does have a power. You can really feel it."

Lyrically, Scott has described the song as being "about a real feeling rather than a recollection of a specific incident". He told Melody Maker in 1993, "It's about finding God in my life or in my heart or inside me. I don't come from a particularly religious background, but I always believed in God. I think God and love are the same thing. I think unconditional love is the expression of God in the physical world. I'm not interested in the church's idea of God."

Scott later recalled in a 2003 interview with Valley Advocate, "It's actually one of the most commercial, radio-friendly songs musically that I've ever produced. In many countries it was successful, but in Britain, they wouldn't play it because of the chorus."

== Release ==
The front and back of the single sleeve features photographs of Glastonbury Tor, taken by Mid Somerset Series editor and amateur photographer Michael Mathias. Mathias, who was selling posters and postcards of his photography locally, was contacted by the Waterboys' New York-based management company via the Glastonbury shop Gothic Image. They asked him for samples of his work and subsequently chose two images for the single sleeve.

== Music video ==
The song's music video was directed by John Downer. Before a video was made for the previous single "The Return of Pan", Scott had refused to shoot videos for most of the Waterboys' singles. He considered the medium to taint the listener's relationship with a song and spoil their imagination of it by presenting imagery that was often "shallow and moronic". Scott suggested and controlled the vision for the video for "The Return of Pan", but was still left disappointed by the results as it was "a thousand miles from the intent of the song". As a result of that experience, Scott decided to give the director of "Glastonbury Song" the freedom to do as they wished.

Scott received a number of ideas for the video from various directors, but he felt most were clichéd. After Geffen provided him with boxes of showreels from numerous directors, Scott opted to work with John Downer as he admired the director's video for Peter Gabriel's 1992 hit "Digging in the Dirt". Although Scott felt Downer's subsequent video treatment for "Glastonbury Song" contained a lot of clichés and misinterpretations of the song's lyrics, he agreed to go along with it and flew from the United States to England to shoot it. In his autobiography, Scott recalled how he felt "ill at ease" during the shoot and looked awkward on camera. Downer's attempts to rectify that by directing him more closely only worsened Scott's experience, making him feel like "a prisoner in my own promo: a kind of animated, patronised prop".

Scott was dissatisfied with the end result, dismissing it as "cleverly filmed nonsensical tosh". He recalled in his autobiography, "Worst of all, every time the chorus came round the dry ice footage showed me portentously sticking my head, Jehovah-like, from a cloud high above Glastonbury Tor. And because viewers assume artists to be complicit in their videos, it made me look like an egotist with a messiah complex who thought I was god." Despite their attempts to change Scott's mind, Geffen ultimately accepted his wishes not to release the video. Downer "ranted bitterly" to Scott over the phone for his decision, but the video was left unreleased.

The video has since surfaced on YouTube. Scott told Q in 2017, "It's only sneaked out in the YouTube age, so I did my job well. I buried it. This was my work and my song, and this video made my song look like a piece of shit."

== Promotion ==
Scott made his only live appearance on Top of the Pops with "Glastonbury Song", which was broadcast on 22 July 1993. He assembled a "one-off Waterboys" for the performance, which included guitarist Chris Bruce and drummer Carla Azar.

== Critical reception ==
Upon its release as a single, The Arbroath Herald awarded "Glastonbury Song" a nine out of ten rating. The reviewer stated, "This is a bit of all right, with some beautiful chord sequences, reminding us a bit of ELO. The Waterboys are best known for their twice-a-hit 'The Whole of the Moon', but this should enhance their reputation further." They also called the B-side, "Chalice Hill", a "slow-ish and pleasant" instrumental. Penny Kiley of the Liverpool Echo commented, "The song is very Mike Scott with its meditative verse, celebratory chorus and ragbag of spiritual references. The music has enough movement to make it almost rocky but with a gentle feel." Nick Varley of The Northern Echo described it as a "pleasant piece of folk-tinged pop which builds to a catchy climax full of big chords and haunting vocal touches". Peter Kinghorn of the Evening Chronicle called it a "potently punchy midpacer". The Accrington Observer gave the "typically-vibrant, passionate song" a four out of five star rating.

Paul Moody of NME was more critical of the song, calling it "not a recommendation" and stating that it is "as pompous as the title suggests", with Scott "bellowing 'I've just found God!' over the most turgid drone this side of Marillion". He added, "Had you ever wondered what Supertramp would sound like as raggle-taggle mystic seers, then relax, your day has come." Richard Plunkett of the Australian newspaper The Age stated, "Scott has long been touted as one of the big hopes of rock music, and the Celtic-influenced singer-songwriter excels himself here. It takes a certain genius to make a line such as 'I just found God' work. Great stuff, and quite exceptional production."

In a review of Dream Harder, Caroline Sullivan of The Guardian noted, "The new album is still Scott-as-hippie-gypsy. There's the epitomical 'Glastonbury Song': it may sound like glossy pop-rock, but the lyric reveals a Scott pining for simple, mud-caked values." Stereo Review noted, "The lightness of touch, traditional instrumentation, and pantheistic-minded celebrations that have typified the Waterboys from Fisherman's Blues forward are evident in 'Glastonbury Song'." CD Review wrote, "Scott still manages to provide some light melodic relief with 'Glastonbury Song' and 'Corn Circles,' recalling his more typical work and English roots."

In a 2011 feature for The Guardian on his love of the Waterboys, British screenwriter, producer, and film director Richard Curtis picked "Glastonbury Song" in his Waterboys top 10 song list. He wrote, "Wonderful, energetic song about the endless search for spirituality. Sounds ghastly – is fab." In a 2017 retrospective on the "best of Mike Scott", Tom Doyle of Q included "Glastonbury Song" as one of ten tracks on the list and described it as a "staccato groover with cryptic lyric that sparks with the joy of enlightenment".

== Track listings ==
7-inch and cassette single
No.	Title	Length
1.	"Glastonbury Song"	3:42
2.	"Chalice Hill"	1:52

12-inch and CD single
No.	Title	Length
1.	"Glastonbury Song"	3:42
2.	"Chalice Hill"	1:52
3.	"Burlington Bertie and Accrington Stanley"	2:22
4.	"Corn Circle Symphony"	6:22

US CD single
No.	Title	Length
1.	"Glastonbury Song"	3:42
2.	"Karma"	2:47
3.	"Mister Powers"	7:00
4.	"Burlington Bertie and Accrington Stanley"	2:22
5.	"Chalice Hill"	2:38

== Personnel ==
Musicians

- Mike Scott – vocals, lead guitar, rhythm guitar, keyboard, percussion
- Chris Bruce – lead guitar, rhythm guitar
- Scott Thunes – bass
- Carla Azar – drums
- Tawatha Agee – backing vocals on "Glastonbury Song"
- Cindy Mizelle – backing vocals on "Glastonbury Song"
- Fonzi Thornton – backing vocals on "Glastonbury Song"
- Sugar Blue – harmonica on "Karma"

Production

- Mike Scott – production (all tracks)
- Bill Price – production, recording and mixing on "Glastonbury Song" and "Karma"
- Niko Bolas – recording and mixing on "Chalice Hill", "Burlington Bertie and Accrington Stanley", "Corn Circle Symphony" and "Mister Powers"
- Mike White – additional engineering on "Chalice Hill", "Burlington Bertie and Accrington Stanley" and "Mister Powers"

Other

- Michael Mathias – photography

== Charts ==
Chart (1993)	Peak position
Europe (Eurochart Hot 100)	48
Europe (European Hit Radio)	26
Ireland (IRMA)	12
Portugal (AFP)	3
UK Singles (OCC)	29
