= Fisherman's Blues (song) =

Single by The Waterboys

from the album Fisherman's Blues
- B-side: "Lost Highway"
- Released: December 1988 (US); January 1989 (UK)
- Length: 4:23
- Label: Ensign, Chrysalis
- Songwriters: Mike Scott; Steve Wickham
- Producer: Mike Scott

The Waterboys singles chronology
"Medicine Bow" (1986)	"Fisherman's Blues" (1988)	"And a Bang on the Ear" (1989)

"Fisherman's Blues" is a song from folk rock band The Waterboys, which was released in 1988 as the lead single from their fourth studio album of the same name. It was written by Mike Scott and Steve Wickham, and produced by Scott. The song reached number 3 on the US Billboard Modern Rock Tracks chart, number 13 in Ireland and number 32 in the UK.

The single was reissued in the UK on 27 May 1991 to promote the compilation album The Best of The Waterboys 81–90. The reissue reached number 17 in Ireland and number 75 in the UK.

== Background ==
Scott began writing the song on a plane flight from New York to London, at the end of the Waterboys' North American tour in November 1985. During his time in New York, Scott had a meeting with the band's manager, Gary Kurfirst, however their relationship had become strained by this time. In his autobiography, Scott revealed: "I knew that the relationship [with Kurfirst] was in terminal decline. I wanted out. Squeezed into seat 31F, I wrote down my feelings in verse on the back of my boarding pass, the beginnings of a new song called "Fisherman's Blues"." Some of the lyrics were also inspired by the W. H. Auden poem "The Night Mail".

The song was recorded at Windmill Lane Studios in Dublin, Ireland, on 23 January 1986 as part of the first session for the album of the same name. Speaking of the song's recording to Songfacts in 2013, Scott recalled: "I wrote the third verse in the studio. The music got written that day in the studio as well. I had the chords, but the tone of the song came from Steve Wickham's fiddle accompaniment."

== Critical reception ==
On its release as a single, Music & Media considered the song to be a "spirited recording of Dylanesque folk", with "effective use of mandolin and fiddle" and "straightforward production". Jerry Smith of Music Week praised it as "rousing anthem" and added, "With its duelling fiddles and mandolins it should lead everyone frantically jigging into the New Year."

In a review of the 1991 reissue, Terry Staunton of New Musical Express considered the song to be superior to the "most overrated" "The Whole of the Moon" and praised it for "show[ing] just what Scott is capable of with a bit of effort and intelligence". He added that the band's recent "renewed interest could well catapult this raggle-taggle charmer into the top ten". Ian Gittins of Melody Maker described it as a "rapt declaration" with Scott "hooting with glee as he leads us through his gypsy ramble". He added it was "a welcome chance" to hear the song again, but with "more reservations" than with the recently re-released "The Whole of the Moon", as "Fisherman's Blues" "appeared at the time when Scott was relocating to Galway, switching his view from the stars to the soil, lowering his sights from 'You saw Brigadoon' to 'I wish I was a fisherman'." Gittins also noted the "mighty version" of "Medicine Bow" on the single.

In a review of Fisherman's Blues, Spin commented on the song: "Scott strums his acoustic guitar as if every chord's a mile, while bandmates Steve Wickham and Anthony Thistlethwaite hasten his speed." Ian Abrahams of Record Collector described the song as "thrillingly evocative", adding: "Nailed in just two run-throughs, it's perfect, definitive and timeless."

== Formats ==
7", 12" and CD single
No.	Title	Length
1.	"Fisherman's Blues"	4:23
2.	"Lost Highway"	4:18

Cassette single
No.	Title	Length
1.	"Fisherman's Blues"	4:23
2.	"Medicine Bow"	5:18
3.	"Lost Highway"	4:18

== Charts ==
Chart (1989)	Peak position
Ireland (IRMA)	13
New Zealand (RIANZ)	20
UK Singles (Official Charts)	32
US Alternative Airplay (Billboard)	3

Chart (1991)	Peak position
Ireland (IRMA)	17
UK Singles (OCC)	75
UK Airplay (Music Week)	43

== Certifications ==
Region	Certification	Certified units/sales
New Zealand (RMNZ)	Gold	15,000^{‡}
United Kingdom (BPI)	Silver	200,000^{‡}
^{‡} Sales+streaming figures based on certification alone.

== Personnel ==
The Waterboys

- Mike Scott - vocals, guitar
- Steve Wickham - fiddle
- Anthony Thistlethwaite - mandolin
- Trevor Hutchinson - bass
- Peter McKinney - drums

Additional personnel

- Liam O'Maonlai - piano on "Lost Highway"
- Noel Bridgeman - drums on "Lost Highway"

Production

- Mike Scott - producer
- Pat McCarthy, Pearse Dunne - recording of "Fisherman's Blues"
- Will Read Dick - recording of "Fisherman's Blues"
- Phil Tennant - mixing on "Fisherman's Blues"
