= Dream Harder =

Studio album by the Waterboys
- Released: 24 May 1993
- Recorded: New York City
- Genre: Rock
- Length: 43:33
- Labels: Geffen, Puck
- Producers: Mike Scott, Bill Price

The Waterboys chronology
Room to Roam (1990)	Dream Harder (1993)	The Live Adventures of the Waterboys (2000)

Dream Harder is the sixth studio album by the Waterboys, released by Geffen Records on 24 May 1993. Led by Scottish singer-songwriter-instrumentalist Mike Scott, the album features none of the earlier UK-based band members and instead finds Scott backed by American session musicians. It was the last Waterboys album before Scott spent seven years pursuing a formal solo career, with Bring 'Em All In (1995) and Still Burning (1997). The album reached position 171 on the Billboard Top 200 charts, surpassing the previous Waterboys album Room to Roam, in spite of a less-than-enthusiastic response from critics to the album's sound.

The album art was provided by the photography of Michael Halsband and John Hardin and the painting of Pal Shazar, under the direction of Frank Olinsky and Tom Zutaut.

Dream Harder was a return to a rock, or even hard rock, sound after the traditional Celtic-influenced preceding two albums. It did, however, continue the Waterboys' tradition of arranging a William Butler Yeats poem, in this case "Love And Death". "The Return of Pan" is the Waterboys' second ode to the Greek deity, and the album contains a number of references to the romantic Neopaganism of Dion Fortune and the mystical Christianity of C. S. Lewis, as well as a tribute to guitarist Jimi Hendrix. The album was reissued with a different tracklist and mixes in 2024 as Dream Harder - The Director's Cut.

== Background ==
Shortly before the release of the Waterboys' fifth studio album, Room to Roam, Mike Scott and his long-time band member Anthony Thistlethwaite decided they wanted to change the band's musical direction by returning to their rock-orientated sound. As a result, the "Magnificent Seven" line-up parted ways before the album's tour and a new four-piece version of the band toured with a rock-dominated sound. Scott then looked for fresh inspiration by relocating from Ireland to Greenwich Village, New York, in September 1991. While most of the songs which appeared on Dream Harder were written when Scott was still living in Ireland, work on recording the album did not begin until January 1992, after Scott had signed a new record deal with Geffen Records. The label's A&R man suggested that Scott collaborate with producer Bill Price and they produced Dream Harder together. Scott told Melody Maker in 1993, "Geffen knew I wanted to do a gung-ho rock 'n' roll album and they suggested him. I like Bill, the decision made itself." He went on to summarise the material on Dream Harder, "The record reflects what I was going through in 1991. My life was changing in a lot of ways, and that's what I started writing about."

== Songs ==
"The New Life", one of many Scott songs which are both optimistic and touch upon spirituality, was written during April 1991 on the same night that he returned to Ireland from a three-week holiday in the Caribbean. Scott recalled, "I'd been drinking very heavily for a while, and my wife packed me off on holiday and I stopped drinking. When I came back I felt great, like I was back in control of my own life, and that night I wrote 'The New Life'." The lyrics of the song were influenced by the changes in Scott's life at the time, such as the break-up of the "Magnificent Seven" line-up, the end of his record deal with Chrysalis and the decision to leave Ireland. The song contains a phrase "Are you under the mercy?", which Scott explains as "a phrase I nicked from a Christian fan who wrote me a letter and signed off with "under the mercy", which I took to mean (and this is what I intended in the song) "under the mercy of spirit/the sacred/the presence of love" – though Christians would say under the mercy of Christ".

"Glastonbury Song" was released as the album's second single, backed by the songs "Chalice Hill", "Burlington Bertie And Accrington Stanley", and "Corn Circle Symphony". Scott, discussing the song in 2003, described the song as "one of the most commercial, radio-friendly songs musically that I've ever produced", and ascribes its lack of success to its theme, "..the chorus is 'I just found God where He always was'... In many countries it was successful, but in Britain, they wouldn't play it because of the chorus.". James Heflin, the interviewer, notes that the song reached the Top 30 in the UK and was performed live on Top of the Pops broadcast on the BBC. The song was covered by Italian singer-songwriter Samuele Bersani, with new Italian lyrics, released under the title of "Cosa vuoi da me" (What do you want from me?) and included on his 1994 album Freak and released as a single a year later.

"The Return of Pan" was released as the album's first single, with the songs "Karma" (also the name of one of Scott's earlier musical projects), "Mister Powers" and an untitled track. "The Return of Pan"'s lyrics recount an episode from Plutarch's "The Obsolescence of Oracles". Plutarch writes that, during the reign of Tiberius, a sailor named Thamus heard the following shouted to him from land; "Thamus, are you there? When you reach Palodes, take care to proclaim that the great god Pan is dead." After retelling the story, the singer of "The Return of Pan" insists that "The Great God Pan is alive!". The single charted at position twenty-four on the UK singles chart May 1993.

Scott has described "Corn Circles" as "kind of a mischievous song" and told the NME in 1993, "I don't know what the corn circles are. I'm just singing a song about them. They're a great modern mysterly and they enchant me." "Love and Death" is a poem by William Butler Yeats. It first appeared in the 1885 Dublin University Review. Scott told Melody Maker, "I sat at the piano and the tune just came to me. The poem's so obscure that when we sent a tape to the Yeats Estate in Ireland for their approval, they couldn't find it in their files." "The Return of Jimi Hendrix" was inspired by a dream Scott had while he was visiting New York with his wife in 1991, prior to moving there. Scott recalled, "I'd been at a friend's house watching videos of Jimi, that's when I got turned on to him. I'd always liked him but he'd never been my main man. I watched these videos and was blown away. That night I had a dream and I just woke up and wrote it down. It was this incredible vision of all these modern-day characters in New York being freaked out by Jimi's whammy-bar."

== Critical reception ==
Professional ratings
Review scores
Source	Rating
AllMusic	2/5 stars
Entertainment Weekly	C+
NME	8/10
Rolling Stone	4/5 stars
Select	4/5 stars

Upon its release, Mat Smith of Melody Maker praised "Dream Harder" as a "truly monumental return to form" and a "psyche-altering explosion of spiritual fireworks". As a return to the band's original rock-based sound, Smith described it as "the album Waterboys fans have waited nearly eight years for" and noted that the guitars, "electric at last!", "scream like a resurrectional choir beckoning [Scott] back through the paradisal gates". At the end of the year, Melody Maker placed the album at number 38 on their top 40 "albums of the year" list. Neil Spencer of The Observer considered the album to have a sound "dominated by fretboard-throttling rock guitar". He added, "While more appealing to a US audience, the new sound sits oddly with Scott's pagan concerns, but Scott's enthusiasm for thundering tunes and offbeat themes is infectious."

Robin Denselow of The Guardian felt that despite its "New Yorkised production sheen", the album is "still Scott-as-hippie-gypsy", with most of the songs having a "starchild vein" and a "run-reading ambience". Stuart Bailie of the NME described the album as "some party" but not "unconditionally great". He wrote, "The problem with any party like Dream Harder is that you've got to bring along an open mind. You've got to accept the premise that Mike Scott has some kind of a vision, and allow him to tell you about it." He praised "half a dozen" of the songs as "stupendous", including "Glastonbury Song" and "Preparing to Fly", but was a little more critical of some others, such as the Marillion-sounding "Love and Death", "Corn Circles", which he felt is "a bit silly in the wake of three magical songs", and "Spiritual City", which "comes across like Neil from The Young Ones doing 'Hole in My Shoe'."

In the US, John Swenson of Rolling Stone felt Dream Harder was the band's "most fully realized album" at the time. Troy J. Augusto of Cash Box selected Dream Harder as his "Pick of the Week" in June 1993. He believed Scott sounded "more confident and emotive than ever", with the album containing a "bold new edge" and "no filler". Jim Farber of Entertainment Weekly described it as "straight-on rock" and added, "Moments entice, but mostly Dream Harder shows what could've happened to U2 if they never lightened up." Billboard were more mixed in their review, commenting, "Scott returns to basics with a slightly subdued recap of the style with which he rose to prominence. Problem is that his instrumental foils are largely undistinguished, and sidesteps into folk, middle Eastern and mild reggae don't display much punch." In a retrospective review, Stephen Thomas Erlewine of AllMusic considered the album to be a return to the "big rock sound of earlier albums like This is the Sea" but felt the material did not "carry the same weight" as that on the band's previous two albums.

== Dream Harder - The Director's Cut (2024) ==
On 1 November 2024, a "Director's Cut" version of the album was released on streaming platforms. Several tracks use previously unreleased Brendan O'Brien mixes from 1993 and the others were given a "souped-up sound" by Scott. The tracks "Suffer" and "Spiritual City" were replaced by "Kiss the Wind" and "Workin' Out My Karma", and "The New Life" was restored to its original full length. Scott explained, "I came across Brendan O'Brien's unused mixes for this album and they were better than the ones on the record. So I revamped the album using several of the O'Brien tracks, and souped-up the sound of some others. I removed two numbers which I don't like so much and added two that I do. Also restored the full length '[The] New Life' which, for reasons I now find inexplicable, I shortened at the time."

== Track listing ==
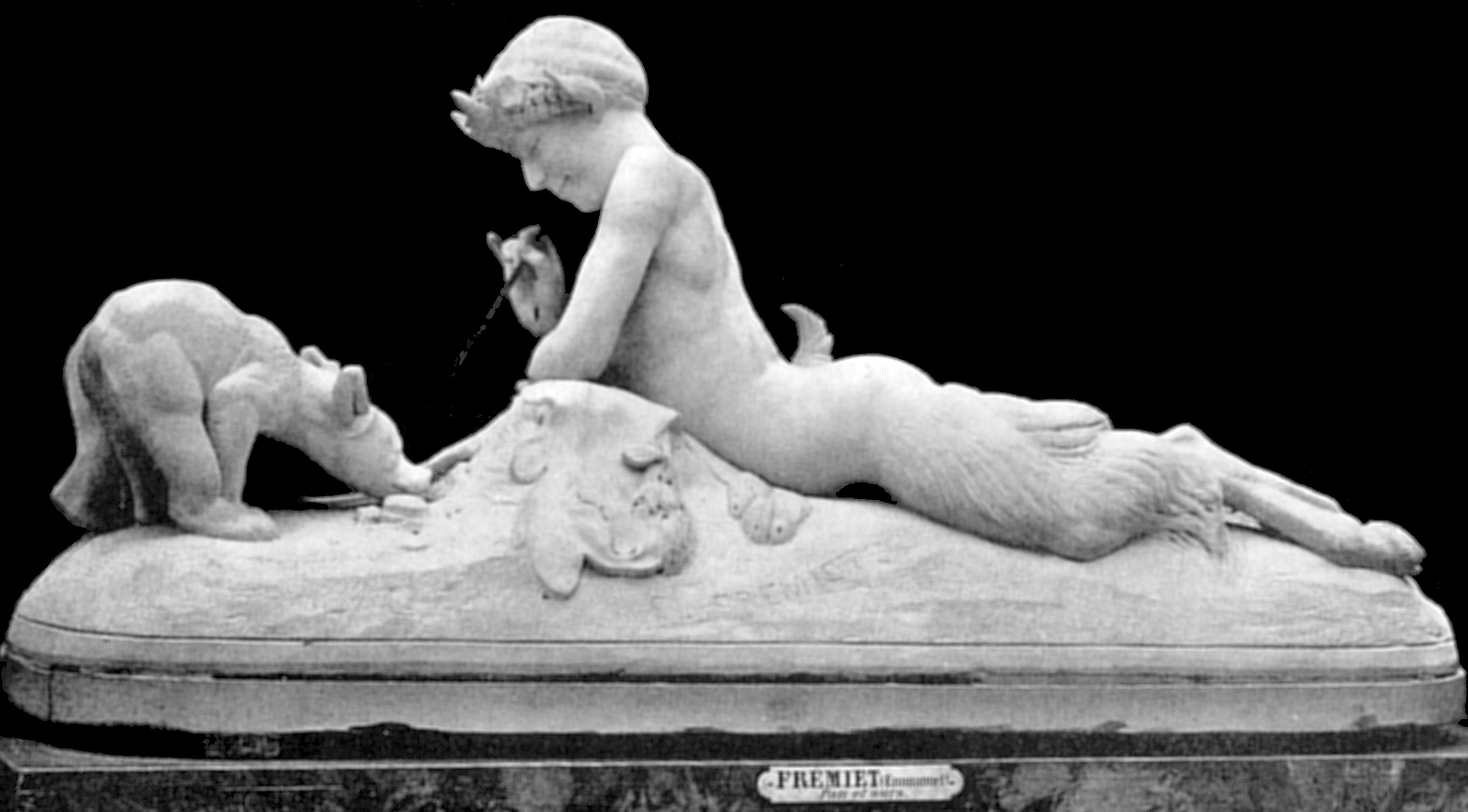
Pan, shown here, was also referenced in "The Pan Within" on This Is the Sea.

Tracks written by Mike Scott, except where noted.

=== (original version) ===
1. "The New Life" – 5:08
2. "Glastonbury Song" – 3:43
3. "Preparing to Fly" – 4:34
4. "The Return of Pan" – 4:19
5. "Corn Circles" – 4:05
6. "Suffer" – 3:49
7. "Winter Winter" – 0:33
8. "Love and Death" (words: William Butler Yeats, music: Scott) – 2:44
9. "Spiritual City" – 3:11
10. "Wonders of Lewis" – 2:04
11. "The Return of Jimi Hendrix" (words: Scott, music: Scott, Anthony Thistlethwaite, Jim Keltner) – 5:48
12. "Good News" – 3:35

=== (2024 Director's Cut reissue) ===
1. "Kiss the Wind" – 2:28
2. "The New Life" (full-length) – 6:41
3. "Glastonbury Song" – 3:43
4. "Preparing to Fly" – 4:33
5. "The Return of Pan" – 4:20
6. "Corn Circles" – 4:05
7. "Workin' Out My Karma" – 2:23
8. "Winter Winter" – 0:34
9. "Love and Death" (words: William Butler Yeats, music: Scott) – 2:46
10. "Spiritual City" – 3:11
11. "Wonders of Lewis" – 2:04
12. "The Return of Jimi Hendrix" (words: Scott, music: Scott, Anthony Thistlethwaite, Jim Keltner) – 5:49
13. "Good News" – 3:39

== Personnel ==
- Mike Scott – guitar, percussion, rhythm guitar, keyboards, vocals
- Kenny Aaronson – bass guitar on "The New Life" and "Suffer"
- Tawatha Agee – background vocals on "Glastonbury Song"
- Laura Lee Ash – additional background vocals on "Preparing to Fly"
- Carla Azar – drums
- Chris Bruce – lead guitar, rhythm guitar
- Darwin Buschman, M.D. – additional background vocals on "Preparing to Fly"
- James Campagnola – saxophone
- Billy Connolly – voices
- Roger Greenawalt – additional background vocals on "Preparing to Fly"
- Steve Holley – drums on "Corn Circles"
- Bashiri Johnson – conga, drums, tambourine, shaker, talking drum
- Jim Keltner – drums on "The Return of Jimi Hendrix"
- Caroline Lavelle – cello on "Love and Death"
- Cindy Mizelle – background vocals on "Glastonbury Song"
- Jerry Peters – percussion
- Fiona Prendergast – additional background vocals on "Preparing to Fly"
- Thommy Price – drums on "The New Life" and "Suffer"
- Ljubisa "Lubi" Ristic – sitar
- Pal Shazar – background vocals on "Preparing to Fly"
- Jules Shear – background vocals on "Preparing to Fly"
- Brian Stanley – bass guitar on "Corn Circles"
- George Stathos – Greek clarinet
- Fonzi Thornton – background vocals on "Glastonbury Song"
- Scott Thunes – bass guitar
- Terry Wetmore – additional background vocals on "Preparing to Fly"

Technical

- Bill Price, Niko Bolas – mixing

== Charts ==
Chart performance for Dream Harder
Chart (1993)	Peak position
Australian Albums (ARIA)	69
Dutch Albums Chart	54
German Albums Chart	67
New Zealand Albums Chart	28
Norwegian Albums Chart	3
Swedish Albums Chart	13
UK Albums Chart	5
US Billboard 200	171
