= Noel Bridgeman =

Irish drummer (1946–2021)

Noel "Nollaig" Bridgeman
- Birth name: Noel A. Bridgeman
- Born: 10 December 1946; Dublin, Ireland
- Died: 23 March 2021 (aged 74); Dublin, Ireland
- Genres: Blues rock, psychedelic rock, hard rock, folk rock
- Occupation: Drummer
- Years active: 1967–2021
- Formerly of: Skid Row; The Waterboys

Noel A. "Nollaig" Bridgeman (10 December 1946 – 23 March 2021) was an Irish musician, best known as a drummer and a co-founder of the blues rock band Skid Row alongside Phil Lynott, Brush Shiels and Bernard "Ben" Cheevers.

== Biography ==
Bridgeman enjoyed a long career after emerging from the Irish blues boom in the 1960s and went on to record and play with Skid Row, before becoming a much in-demand drummer in both studio sessions and in concert. He also played and recorded with Jackson Browne, Sharon Shannon, Steve Earle, Dónal Lunny, Paul Brady, The Chieftains, The Waterboys and The Corrs. He was a member of Mary Black's band for several years in the mid-late 1980s and early 1990s and again briefly after the death in 1996 of his successor, Dave Early.
