= Richard Naiff =

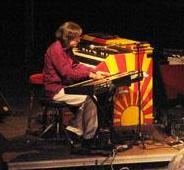
- Naiff playing keyboards in 2003

Background information
- Born: Richard Naiff; London, England
- Genres: Rock, folk, folk rock, blues
- Occupation: Musician
- Instruments: Piano, keyboards, flute

Richard Naiff is a British pianist and flautist from London who has performed with the bands Soulsec, The Catacoustics, The Waterboys and The Icicle Works. Naiff is a classically trained musician, having joined the Guildhall School of Music at age ten. The Irish music website Cluas.com describes Naiff as "phenomenally talented".

Naiff was invited to participate on The Waterboys' album A Rock in the Weary Land after the group's leader Mike Scott heard his piano work in a studio next to one where the recording sessions for A Rock in the Weary Land were taking place. Naiff joined the band officially in June 2000. Along with Mike Scott and Steve Wickham, Naiff made up the core of the post-2000 Waterboys band.

Former Waterboy Ian McNabb described Naiff as Scott's "find of the century". Not coincidentally, while keeping his membership in the Waterboys, Naiff also joined McNabb's touring band in 2004, and became a member of a revived version of McNabb's old band The Icicle Works in 2006.

Naiff's rock and roll influences include The Damned.

Naiff left The Waterboys in 2009 to spend more time with his family.
