= Nicky Mehta =

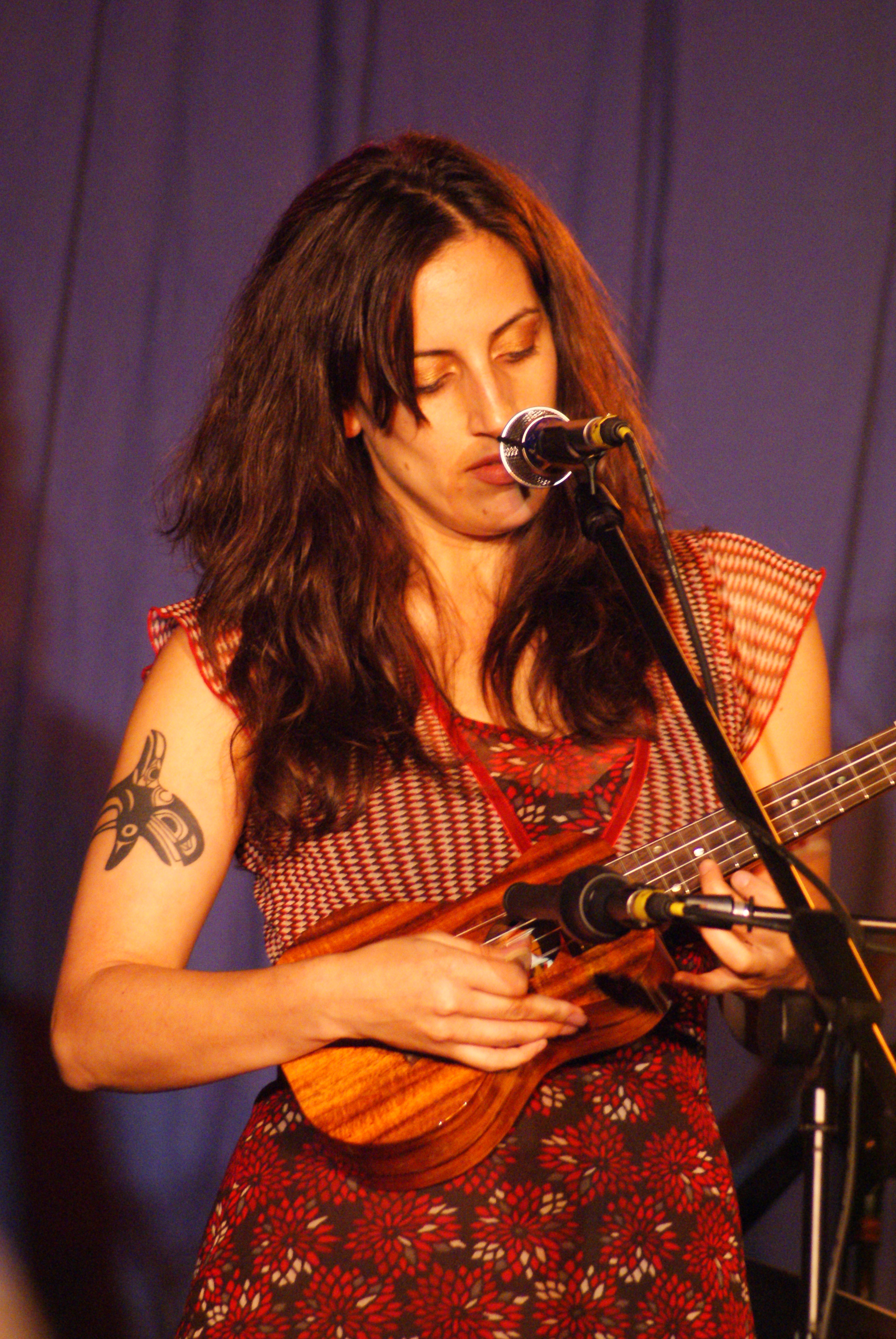

Background information
- Origin: Canada
- Genres: Folk, bluegrass
- Occupations: Singer, songwriter
- Instruments: Guitar, harmonica, percussion
- Member of: The Wailin' Jennys
- Website: www.nickymehta.ca

Nicky Mehta is a mezzo singer-songwriter, and member of Canadian folk trio The Wailin' Jennys.

== Early life ==
Before fully entering into a life of music, Mehta attended Queen's University in Kingston, Ontario, where she attained an honours degree in Media Studies. She also has a certificate in photography. She spent much of her late twenties working with at-risk youth as a mentor and program facilitator and also worked in the child welfare system as a support worker.

== Career ==
Mehta began her career in music as a backing vocalist for several touring bands. Since 1995, she has also fronted several groups, including the five-piece folk rock band Good Blind Soul, as well as a jazz ensemble, and a folk duo known as Wellspring.

Throughout the late 1990s and early 2000s Mehta worked on her own material as well as these collaborations, and in 2002 released Weather Vane, a full-length solo album that was nominated for a 2002 Canadian Independent Music Award. This was also the year that she joined with Cara Luft and Ruth Moody to form The Wailin' Jennys. As well as providing vocals for the trio, Mehta plays guitar, harmonica, and percussion. Since 2002 she has mostly concentrated on working with the Jennys, and has released an EP and four full-length albums with them.

As a songwriter, Mehta has been a finalist in the USA Songwriting Competition for her song "Arlington." Her song "Begin" was placed in indie film The Cake Eaters directed by Mary Stuart Masterson and starring Kristen Stewart. "Begin" was also featured on the show Army Wives.

In the last few years, Mehta has spent her time mentoring at-risk youth as well as younger musicians in the music industry, serving on arts affiliated boards, and writing for contemporary dance. She has also become an activist in the area of mental health and advocates for funding reform, increased access to medical services and stigma reduction.

In 2018, she released a children's book, called Away But Never Gone, illustrated by Kimberley Slezak. It is based on the song of the same name from Bright Morning Stars.

She is now working on her second solo album.

== Personal life ==
In 2009, Mehta gave birth to twin sons who toured with her and her partner, the Jennys' sound engineer Grant Johnson, from the age of seven months to two years old.

== Discography ==
- Weather Vane (2002) – Solo album
- The Wailin' Jennys EP – with The Wailin' Jennys
- 40 Days (2004) – with The Wailin' Jennys
- Firecracker (2006) – with The Wailin' Jennys
- Live at the Mauch Chunk Opera House (2009) – with The Wailin' Jennys
- Bright Morning Stars (2011) – with The Wailin' Jennys
- Fifteen (2017) – with The Wailin' Jennys

== Bibliography ==
- Away But Never Gone (2018) – Children's book, illustrated by Kimberley Slezak
