= Ruth Moody =

Australian-Canadian singer-songwriter

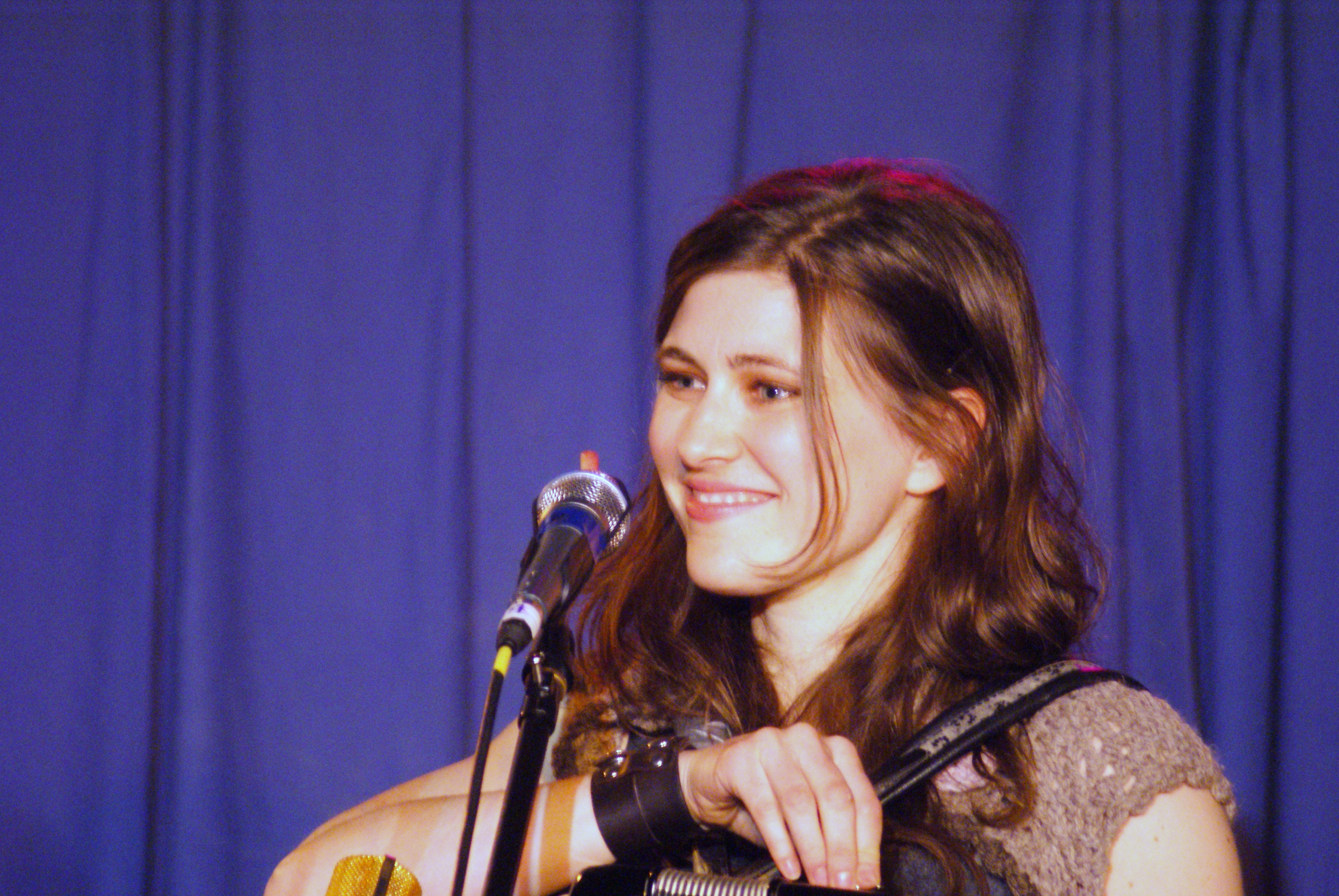
- Moody performing in Ireby, England, on 24 May 2008. Photo by Nick Robinson

Background information
- Born: Australia
- Origin: Winnipeg, Manitoba, Canada
- Genres: Folk, bluegrass
- Occupation: Singer-songwriter
- Instruments: Vocals, guitar, piano, bodhran, accordion, banjo
- Years active: 1997–present
- Member of: The Wailin' Jennys
- Website: ruthmoody.com

Ruth Moody is a Canadian soprano singer-songwriter and member of the folk trio the Wailin' Jennys.

Moody was born in Australia and grew up in Winnipeg, Manitoba, Canada, with her parents Charles and Marcelline, older brother Richard (The Bills), older sister Jane and younger sister Rachel. She was trained classically from the age of four, but unlike her sisters and brother she did not take to a stringed instrument and from her mid-teens began to train vocally instead. In 1993, she began to study English and French literature at university with the intent of becoming a teacher like both her parents. She changed her course in 1996 and decided to forge a life in folk music instead.

Moody's first band was the Juno-nominated roots band Scruj MacDuhk, for whom she was lead singer from 1997 until the group's break up in 2001. After this split she began to focus on her songwriting and picked up the guitar, adding it to her repertoire of piano, bodhran, accordion, and banjo. It was also at this time that she started a musical collaboration with Nicky Mehta and Cara Luft. In 2002, the three took to the stage as the Wailin' Jennys. The Jennys (now Ruth Moody, Nicky Mehta and New York-based Heather Masse) have won international critical acclaim and numerous awards including Juno awards for their albums 40 Days and Bright Morning Stars. They have toured in North America, Europe, and Australia.

Since 2002, Moody has released four full-length albums and an EP with the Wailin' Jennys, and an album with two ex-members of Scruj MacDuhk, Jeremy Penner and Oliver Swain, called South Bound. In July 2002, she released a solo EP called Blue Muse and in April 2010, she released her first full-length solo album, The Garden, produced by David Travers-Smith. The Garden was critically acclaimed and nominated for a Juno award, a Western Canadian Music Award, and three Canadian Folk Music Awards. In 2013, Moody released a new full-length solo album entitled These Wilder Things which included guitar and vocal support from Mark Knopfler among others. She also released a split 7-inch single with Old Man Luedecke in 2014 entitled "Far and Wide". The album was again produced by David Travers-Smith.

In 2015, Moody recorded a duet with Mark Knopfler entitled "Wherever I Go", which subsequently appeared on his 2015 release, Tracker. She has toured as direct support for Knopfler a number of times in Europe and has appeared on stage with him for a handful of shows in the US and Europe.

Since the release of "These Wilder Things" in 2013, Moody has been touring throughout the world as both a solo artist and with her own band or with the Wailin' Jennys.

Moody has received recognition for several of her compositions in the USA Songwriting Competition and the International Songwriting Competition. In April 2012 she won first prize in the International Songwriting Competition (Gospel Category) for her song "Storm Comin".

At the 20th Canadian Folk Music Awards, she won the award for English Songwriter of the Year for her album Wanderer.

== Discography ==
=== Scruj MacDuhk ===
- Live at the West End Cultural Centre (1997)
- The Road to Canso (1999)

=== Solo ===
- Blue Muse (2002) – Solo EP
- The Garden (2010) – Solo album
- These Wilder Things (2013) – Solo album
- Wanderer (2024) – Solo album

=== The Wailin' Jennys ===
- The Wailin' Jennys (2002)
- 40 Days (2004)
- Firecracker (2006)
- Live at the Mauch Chunk Opera House (2009)
- Bright Morning Stars (2011)
- Fifteen (2017)

=== Other recordings ===
- South Bound (2003) – album by Moody Penner and Swain
- Putumayo – Women of the World Acoustic (2007) – with the Wailin' Jennys – compilation featuring Moody's "One Voice"
- Down at the Sea Hotel (2007) – with the Wailin' Jennys – compilation of lullabies featuring Red House Records artists
- Privateering (2012) – guest vocals with Mark Knopfler
- Far and Wide (2014) – split 7-inch with Old Man Luedecke
- Tracker (2015) – duet with Mark Knopfler on "Wherever I Go"; backing vocals on "Basil", "Skydiver" and "Long Cool Girl"
