= Frechette =

Frechette or Fréchette may refer to:

== People ==
- Antoine Fréchette (1905–1978), Canadian businessman and politician
- Billie Frechette (1907–1969), American singer and actress, involved with bank robber John Dillinger
- Carole Fréchette (born 1949), Canadian playwright
- Christine Fréchette (born 1970), Canadian politician
- Clayton Frechette (1892–1974), Canadian ice hockey player
- Dan Frechette (born 1976), Canadian singer-songwriter, instrumentalist and entertainer
- Emmanuel Fréchette (born 1969), Canadian film production designer and commercial art director
- Gabrielle Tougas-Fréchette, Canadian film producer
- John Frechette (1942–2014), American football player
- Kristin Shrader-Frechette (born 1944), American academic of environmental justice
- Louise Fréchette (born 1946), Canadian diplomat and public servant
- Louis-Honoré Fréchette (1839–1908), Canadian politician and author
- Louis-Israël Côté dit Fréchette (1848–1923), Canadian merchant and politician
- Mark Frechette (1947–1975), American actor
- Myles Frechette (1936–2017), American diplomat
- Pauline Fréchette (1889-1943), poet, dramatist, journalist, nun; daughter of Louis-Honoré Fréchette
- Peter Frechette (born 1956), American actor
- Raynald Fréchette (1933–2007), Canadian jurist and politician
- Sylvie Fréchette (born 1967), Canadian synchronised swimmer
- Ted Frechette (1940–2024), Canadian football player

== Places ==
- Frechette Island, Manitoulin, Ontario, Canada

== See also ==
- Flechette
- Fréchet (disambiguation)
