= Bija =

Bija may refer to:

- Bija, India, a village in Punjab, India
- Bija State, a former princely state with seat in the above town
- Bīja, a concept in Hinduism and Buddhism
- Bija (album), a music album from 2000
