= Deep well =

Deep well may refer to:

- A water well, an excavation or structure created to access groundwater in underground aquifers
- Deep well drilling, the process of drilling an oil or gas well to a depth of 10,000 feet or more
- Deep Wells, Nevada, a ghost town in Eureka County, Nevada
- Deep Well Station, a pastoral lease and cattle station in the Northern Territory, Australia
- Sham Tseng, suburb of Hong Kong

== See also ==
- Deeper Well (disambiguation)
