= Fast Paced World =

Studio album by The Duhks
- Released: August 2008
- Genre: Folk
- Length: 41:09
- Label: Sugar Hill Records
- Producer: Jay Joyce

The Duhks chronology
| The Duhks at the Backdoor Theater (2008) | Fast Paced World (2008) | The Duhks at MerleFest (2009) |

Fast Paced World is a 2008 album by The Duhks. It is released under the Sugar Hill Records label. The album features Irish folk music, Latin percussion, American folk, and gospel music, as well as singing in English, French, and Portuguese.

Professional ratings
Review scores
| Source | Rating |
|---|---|
| Allmusic | link |
| PopMatters | link |
| Robert Christgau | link |
| The New York Times | (positive) link |

== Track listing ==
1. "Mighty Storm" (traditional)
2. "Fast Paced World" (Sarah Dugas)
3. "This Fall" (S. Dugas)
4. "Adam's 3-Step" (Tania Elizabeth)
5. "Toujours Vouloir" (S. Dugas)
6. "You Don't See It" (Dan Frechette)
7. "Ship High in Transit" (Leonard Podolak)
8. "Magalenha" (Carlinhos Brown)
9. "Sleepin' Is All I Wanna Do (Stars on a Sunny Day)" (S. Dugas)
10. "95 South" (L. Podolak, Jonathan Byrd)
11. "New Rigged Ship (Cumberland Gap/Paddy on the Turnpike/New Rigged Ship)" (all traditional, arranged by the Duhks)
12. "I See You" (T. Elizabeth, S. Dugas)

== Personnel ==
- Tania Elizabeth - fiddles, strings, backing vocals, mandolin (tracks 6 & 11), Rhodes (track 11), Pump organ (track 4)
- Sarah Dugas - lead vocals, backing vocals
- Jordan McConnell - guitars, baritone banjo (track 2), backing vocals
- Leonard Podolak - banjos, backing vocals, lead vocals (track 10)
- Christian Dugas - drums, percussion, mirambula (track 9), backing vocals
