= FestivaLink presents The Duhks at MerleFest, NC 4/24/09 =

Live album by The Duhks
- Released: April 2009
- Genre: Folk
- Length: 44:22
- Label: FestivaLink.net
- Producer: FestivaLink.net

The Duhks chronology
Fast Paced World (2008)	FestivaLink presents The Duhks at MerleFest, NC 4/24/09 (2009)	Beyond the Blue (2014)

FestivaLink presents The Duhks at MerleFest, NC 4/24/09 is the second live album (and the sixth album altogether) by The Duhks. It was produced online at FestivaLink.net, drawn primarily from their live performance at Merlefest 2009. It is notable for several special guest musicians.

== Track listing ==
1. You Don't See It — 3:37
2. Mighty Storm — 4:12
3. 95 South — 3:03
4. Toujours Vouloir — 4:37
5. Fast Paced World — 4:02
6. Ship High in Transit/Magalenha (Papa Senior's) — 6:18
7. Les Blues de Cadien — 3:09
8. Whole Lotta Love — 5:47
9. Death Came a Knockin' (bonus track - MerleFest, NC 4/28/07) — 5:04
10. Les Blues de Cadien (bonus track - MerleFest, NC 4/28/07) — 2:23
11. Whole Lotta Love (bonus track - MerleFest, NC 4/28/07) — 4:14

== Production ==
- Recorded at Merlefest 2009

== Personnel ==
- Tania Elizabeth - fiddle, backup vocals
- Sarah Dugas - lead vocals
- Jordan McConnell - guitar
- Leonard Podolak - banjo, vocals

== Special guests ==
- Casey Driessen - fiddle (track 9)
- Abigail Washburn - banjo (track 9)
- Scott Senior - percussion (track 9)
- John Paul Jones - mandolin (tracks 10–11)
- Maddy Gordon

== Footnotes ==
Tracks seven and eight are really two parts of a single set combining Les Blues du Cadien with Whole Lotta Love, which feature Casey Driessen on fiddle and John Paul Jones of Led Zeppelin on mandolin. This combination is particularly obvious when Sarah cuts back to Les Blues du Cadien right in the middle of Whole Lotta Love (at roughly the point where the free-form section would have appeared in the original Led Zeppelin recording of Whole Lotta Love). Also, the song "Magalenha" is similarly interrupted in the middle by "Papa Senior's" before returning to its normal melody.
