= Bring 'Em In =

Bring 'Em In may refer to:

- Bring 'Em In (Mando Diao album), 2002
- Bring 'Em In (Buddy Guy album), 2005

== See also ==
- Bring 'Em All In, a 1995 album by Mike Scott
