= Deeper Well (disambiguation) =

Deeper Well may refer to:

- Deeper Well, a 2024 album by Kacey Musgraves
- Deeper Well, a 1988 album by David Olney
- "Deeper Well", a song on the 1995 Emmylou Harris album Wrecking Ball
- "Deeper Well", a song on the 2003 The Wailin' Jennys album The Wailin' Jennys
- The Deeper Well, the final resting place of the Old Ones in the Buffyverse

== See also ==
- Deep well
- Deeper in the Well, a 2012 album by Eric Bibb
