= Edmund Dumas =

American Baptist minister, musician, and politician

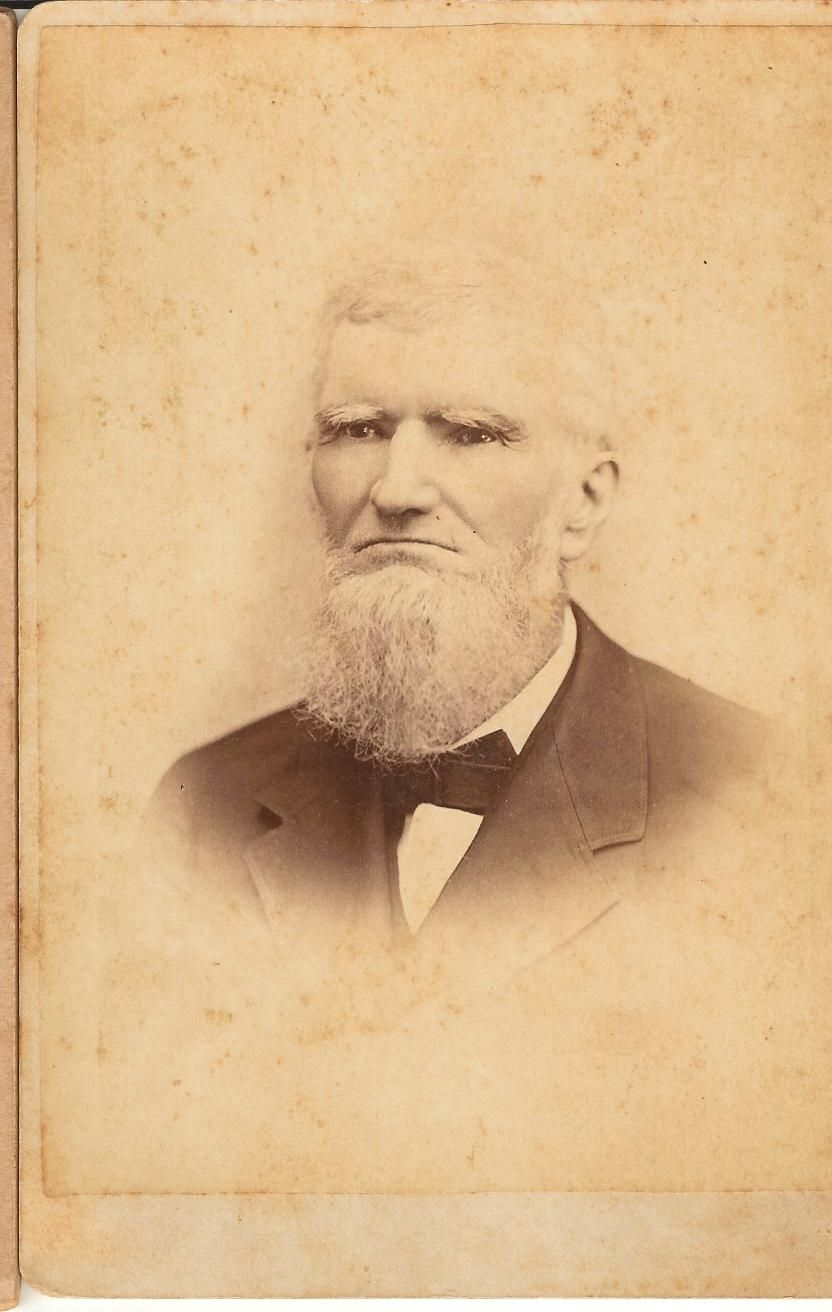
Portrait of Edmund Dumas

Edmund Dumas (February 15, 1810 – October 22, 1882) was an American Primitive Baptist minister, politician, and musician today remembered for his association with the Sacred Harp movement.

Dumas was the son of Benjamin F. Dumas and Martha Ussery, and through his father was the descendant of Huguenot refugees who had first settled in Jamestown, Virginia in 1700. He was born in a part of Richmond County, North Carolina that is today located in Montgomery County, but at the age of four moved with his family to Georgia, where they settled in Putnam County. In 1821 they moved again, this time to Monroe County, Georgia. Dumas married Isabel Martha Gibson in 1830; the couple were the parents of thirteen children.

A circuit rider, Dumas spent over forty years as a Primitive Baptist minister, founding the Union Primitive Baptist Church in Goggins, Georgia in 1837. He was prominent in the community, being active as a local judge in Montgomery County and serving in the Georgia House of Representatives. A Mason, he also ran a singing school in addition to his other musical activities. Dumas died in Monroe County and is buried in the cemetery of the church which he helped found.

Early in his career Dumas composed a comic song entitled "The Botanic Doctor", about the dangers of using calomel; this was published in The Organ on February 14, 1855. In 1869 he served as a member of the revision committee of The Sacred Harp. He composed a number of shape-note tunes, naming some for friends and fellow musicians. These include "White", named for Benjamin Franklin White; "Reese", named for either Henry Smith or John Palmer Reese; "Edmonds", named for Jeremiah Troup Edmonds, and "Mullins", named for the Reverend John Mullins. Other tunes by his hand include "The Gospel Pool", "The Dying Minister", "To Die No More", "Vain World Adieu", "Heavenly Port", and "The Marcellas", as well as an arrangement of "Weeping Savior". "White" is often known by the variant titles "Long Time Travelling" or "I'm a Long Time Travelling Here Below", and has been recorded numerous times under these names. Noted interpreters have included Frank Proffitt, Peter Bellamy, and The Wailin' Jennys, whose version appeared on their 2006 album Firecracker.
