= Joel Fafard =

- Born: November 18, 1968 (age 56); Pense, Saskatchewan
- Origin: Canada
- Genres: Roots and Blues
- Occupation(s): Finger-style and slide guitarist
- Instrument(s): Guitar, Banjo
- Years active: 1990–present
- Website: www.joelfafard.com

Joel Fafard (born November 18, 1968) is a Canadian finger-style and slide guitarist from Saskatchewan. He now lives on the Sunshine Coast in British Columbia.

Fafard has released six albums featuring original and traditional folk/blues instrumentals and songs. He won a Western Canadian Music Award in 2006 and was nominated for a Juno in 2007 for his album ...and another thing... In 2009, he was nominated for a Canadian Folk Music Award for his album Three Hens Escape Oblivion. With Fafard's latest album, Fowl Mood, he builds on his previous success, with a collection of new songs in the southern blues and Appalachian traditions.

Fafard studied guitar with Jack Semple and music at Capilano College in British Columbia, and was a member of the Manitoba-based band Scruj MacDuhk, which later evolved into the Celtic fusion band, The Duhks.

Fafard's 2013 album, Borrowed Horses, was a collaboration with Toronto-based guitarist Joel Schwartz. Schwartz and Fafard toured with Canadian sculptor Joe Fafard, performing at the sculptor's exhibition openings across Canada. The album's title, Borrowed Horses, is a reference to Joe Fafard's sculpture of running horses, which graces the CD cover.

== Discography ==
- 2016 – Fowl Mood
- 2013 – Borrowed Horses
- 2010 – Cluck Old Hen
- 2008 – Three Hens Escape Oblivion
- 2006 – ...and another thing...
- 2003 – Rocking Horse
- 2001 – Head Smashed In
- 1991 – Farmer's Tan

== Awards and nominations ==
2009 Canadian Folk Music Award nominee; 2009 International Acoustic Music Award runner up; 2009 Western Canadian Music Award nominee; 2007 Juno nominee; 2006 Western Canadian Music Award Winner; 2006 Canadian Folk Music Award nominee; 2004 Western Canadian Music Award nominee
