= Kat Goldman =

Canadian singer-songwriter

- Origin: Toronto, Ontario, Canada
- Genre: Folk
- Occupation: Singer-songwriter
- Instruments: Vocals, guitar, piano
- Years active: 1990s–present
- Website: katgoldman.com

Kat Goldman is a Canadian singer-songwriter from Toronto, Ontario.

== Biography ==
Goldman grew up in Toronto, Ontario. She began her career as a singer-songwriter while attending university in Boston, Massachusetts in the early 1990s. She began frequenting Cambridge coffeehouses and busking in Harvard Square.

She returned to Toronto in 1996 and began playing local venues. Gavin Brown (producer for Sarah Harmer and Billy Talent) took an interest in her music and in 2000 they collaborated on the album, The Great Disappearing Act. Her website describes this as the "break-out achievement in her career," noting that after this she was opening for artists like Sarah Slean, Martin Sexton, the Waifs, Regina Spektor, the Strawbs, Dar Williams, Jonatha Brooke, and Eric Andersen. The album's title track earned Goldman an honorable mention in the Pop/Top 40 category at the 2002 International Songwriting Competition.

It was also around this time that she was picked up by the New York City based management firm for Williams and Shawn Colvin. Goldman began doing shows at venues like The Bottom Line, the Bitter End, and the Living Room.

In 2002, a fan of Goldman's shared with James Keelaghan two cassette tapes of her music. which Keelaghan passed on to the Winnipeg band, The Duhks. The Duhks then recorded Goldman's song, "Annabel" on their 2002 album, Your Daughters & Your Sons. Leonard Podolak says the band took quickly to the song: "'Annabel' we got from Kat Goldman, who's a great songwriter from Toronto. The song was written when her grandmother died. When I played it for Jessica Havey, it just naturally came together. When we arranged it, it took about 15 minutes. A lot of songs are like pulling teeth, but this one just happened. It's one of our favorite ones."

In 2004 Goldman was planning to move to New York when she was severely injured in a freak accident (a car crashed into the storefront of a bakery she was visiting). She spent the next two years in recovery. In 2006, while returning to the music business, she sang backing vocals on Jeffery Straker's debut album Songs from Highway 15.

In 2007 Goldman released the album, Sing Your Song. Dar Williams calls the album "wonderful–I can't imagine the world without it." Some of the songs, such as "Driving All Night", have received favorable attention on CBC Radio programs. One reviewer called the album "a record to play at night when you’re feeling a bit introspective and maybe even lonely." Another describes the album as "consistently life-affirming until the end and more importantly, without betraying a hint of sentimentality." Goldman's performance of the title track, "Sing Your Song" once again earned her an honorable mention at the International Songwriting Competition for 2007.

Later in 2007, several songs from Goldman's earlier album, including "Everyone's Getting Married", were included on the soundtrack to the Lifetime Television film I Me Wed. As of 2008 her upcoming gigs include performances at places such as Club Passim in Cambridge, a visit to NPR's the World Cafe in Philadelphia, and a couple of dates opening for Colin Hay (formerly of Men at Work).

Goldman adapted her song Annabel to serve as the theme of Kenny Hotz's Triumph of the Will.

== Discography ==
- The Great Disappearing Act (2000)
- Sing Your Song (2007)
- Gypsy Girl (2012)
