= Still Burning =

Studio album by Mike Scott
- Released: 29 September 1997
- Genre: Rock
- Length: 59:26
- Label: Chrysalis
- Producer: Niko Bolas

Mike Scott chronology
Bring 'em All In (1995)	Still Burning (1997)	The Whole of the Moon: The Music of Mike Scott and the Waterboys (1998)

Professional ratings
Review scores
Source	Rating
AllMusic	link
The Guardian	3/5 stars
Uncut	4/5 stars

Still Burning is the second solo studio album by Mike Scott, released by Chrysalis on 29 September 1997. It followed Scott's 1995 solo debut, Bring 'em All In, and was the last of Scott's solo albums before re-forming The Waterboys in 2000. Photography was provided by Andrew Catlin and Mary Scanlon. Although well-received critically, sales of the album were poor and Scott was subsequently dropped from Chrysalis Records. This led directly to Scott's decision to revive the Waterboys' name in order to achieve wider marketplace exposure. Scott describes the making of and commercial failure of the album in detail in his 2012 autobiography, Adventures of a Waterboy.

The songs "Love Anyway" and "Rare, Precious and Gone" were released as singles. The video for the latter (available to view on YouTube) is notable for having been filmed in a booth at an airport that cost £5.00 to operate while Scott and his band were waiting to board a flight, potentially making it one of the lowest costing filmed music videos ever produced.

== Track listing ==
FIRST ISSUE (1997)

All songs by Mike Scott.

1. "Questions" – 4:49
2. "My Dark Side" – 3:57
3. "Open" – 2:54
4. "Love Anyway" – 6:41
5. "Rare, Precious and Gone" – 4:05
6. "Dark Man of My Dreams" – 4:15
7. "Personal" – 2:14
8. "Strawberry Man" – 3:30
9. "Sunrising" – 4:58
10. "Everlasting Arms" – 2:52

Later editions have a revised track list. The 1998 US release on Steady Records features all 14 songs listed below, while the 1997 Japanese release has 12 tracks, missing "One of Many Rescuers" and "Man on the Mountain".

1. "Questions" – 4:49
2. "My Dark Side" – 3:57
3. "Open" – 2:54
4. "Love Anyway" – 6:41
5. "Rare, Precious and Gone" – 4:05
6. "Dark Man of My Dreams" – 4:15
7. "King Electric" – 7:18
8. "Personal" – 2:14
9. "One of Many Rescuers" (US release only) – 4:52
10. "Strawberry Man" – 3:30
11. "Man on the Mountain" (US release only) – 4:00
12. "Sunrising" – 4:58
13. "Everlasting Arms" – 2:52
14. "Since I Found My School" – 3:01

== Personnel ==
- Chris Bruce – guitar, electric guitar
- James Hallawell – Hammond organ, wurlitzer
- Bill Hawkes – viola
- Preston Heyman – percussion
- Steve Holley – drums
- Paul Kegg - cello
- Jim Keltner – drums, tambourine, shaker
- Martin Loveday – cello
- Ian McNabb – background vocals
- Perry Montague-Mason – violin
- Pino Palladino – bass guitar
- Mike Scott – vocals, guitar
- Brian Stanley – bass
- Gavyn Wright – violin
- Denise Johnson - Backing Vocals

== Charts ==
Chart (1997)	Peak position
Norwegian Albums Chart	18
Swedish Albums Chart	39
UK Albums Chart	34
