= Love Anyway =

Single by Mike Scott

from the album Still Burning
- Released: 15 September 1997
- Length: 6:41
- Label: Chrysalis
- Songwriter(s): Mike Scott
- Producer(s): Mike Scott, Niko Bolas

Mike Scott singles chronology
"Building the City of Light" (1995)	"Love Anyway" (1997)	"Rare, Precious and Gone" (1998)

"Love Anyway" is a song from Scottish singer-songwriter Mike Scott, which was released as the lead single from his second solo album Still Burning. It was written by Mike Scott, and produced by Scott and Niko Bolas. "Love Anyway" reached No. 50 in the UK Singles Chart and remained on the charts for two weeks.

== Background ==
In his autobiography, Scott described the song as a "mid-paced rocker with a hustly Jim Keltner groove and a hazy, chiming guitar figure." It was considered by Chrysalis as the album's best contender for a potential hit. Speaking of its limited success as a single, he said: "Despite all its radio play the song [did not catch] on with the public."

== Music video ==
The song's music video was directed by Matthew Amos and produced by Anna Whiting.

== Critical reception ==
On its release, Wayne Moriarty of the Edmonton Journal considered the song the "best cut" on Still Burning. He described the track as "a big old slab of Waterboys-ish pomp and rock that will remind his devotees just how special it was when Mike and the lads were pioneering the big sound that carried the likes of U2 to fame and fortune." Kerry Gold of the Vancouver Sun noted the song's "multiple violins and lush orchestration".

In a review of Scott's 1997 concert at the Garage in London, James McNair of The Independent was critical of the song's live rendition: "It's not that "Love Anyway" is weak - far from it. The problem is that the soaring strings that are integral to the song's magic on CD are missing live and, at six minutes 42 seconds, the journey is just too long without them."

In his 2002 book The Encyclopedia of Contemporary Christian Music, Mark Allan Powell noted "the manner in which songs like "Love Anyway" bespeak an ethic unlike that which informs previous Waterboys' tunes about heartbreak and disappointment in love. Whereas previous songs express bitterness and even a design for vengeance, "Love Anyway" boasts "You made a fool out of me today / I'm breaking the rule / I love you anyway"." In 2011, Richard Curtis, in a piece for The Guardian on his affection for Scott and the Waterboys, commented: "If you're ever feeling low on energy and hope, pump up "This Is the Sea", "Don't Bang the Drum" or "Love Anyway" and life seems worth living again – worth living large."

== Formats ==
Cassette single (UK release)
No.	Title	Length
1.	"Love Anyway"	6:41
2.	"The King of Stars"	3:15

CD single (UK #1)
No.	Title	Length
1.	"Love Anyway"	6:41
2.	"King Electric (including "Moonage Daydream")"	7:17
3.	"Blues Is My Business"	4:24

CD single (UK #2)
No.	Title	Length
1.	"Love Anyway"	6:41
2.	"Big Lover"	3:35
3.	"Careful with That Melletron, Eugene"	2:57
4.	"Since I Found My School"	3:02

CD single (UK promo)
No.	Title	Length
1.	"Love Anyway (Edit)"	4:33
2.	"Love Anyway (LP Version)"	6:41

CD single (European release)
No.	Title	Length
1.	"Love Anyway"	6:41
2.	"Blues Is My Business"	4:24
3.	"Since I Found My School"	3:02
4.	"King Electric (including "Moonage Daydream")"	7:17

== Personnel ==
Love Anyway

- Mike Scott - lead vocals, rhythm guitar, Canyon guitar, piano, string and melody arrangement
- Chris Bruce - lead guitar
- James Hallawell - Hammond organ
- Pino Palladino - bass
- Jim Keltner - drums, tambourine
- Nick Ingman - orchestration
- Martin Loveday, Paul Kegg - cello
- Isobel Griffiths - fixer strings
- Bill Hawkes, Peter Lale - viola
- Boguslav Kostecki, Perry Montague-Mason, Wilfred Gibson - violins
- Gavyn Wright - first violin

King Electric

- Mike Scott - lead vocals, rhythm guitar, Hammond organ
- Chris Bruce - lead guitar
- Brian Stanley - bass
- Steve Holley - drums

Blues Is My Business

- Mike Scott - lead vocals, rhythm guitar
- Chris Bruce - lead guitar
- Brian Stanley - bass
- Steve Holley - drums

Big Lover

- Mike Scott - vocals, electric guitar, electric piano
- Chris Bruce - lead guitar
- Bob Andrews - Hammond organ
- Pino Palladino - bass
- Jim Keltner - drums
- Preston Heyman - percussion

Careful with That Melletron, Eugene

- Mike Scott - vocals, Bouzouki
- Jan Kybert - Mellotron
- Preston Heyman - percussion

Since I Found My School

- Mike Scott - vocals, electric guitar, piano, Mellotron
- Chris Bruce - electric guitar
- Ian McNabb - guitar, Falsetto vocals
- Pino Palladino - bass
- Jim Keltner - drums

Production

- Mike Scott - producer
- Niko Bolas - producer, recording, engineer, mixing
- Chris Blair - mastering
- Chris Sheldon - mixing on "Love Anyway"

Other

- Jeremy Pearce at 2wo - design
- Andrew Catlin - photography

== Charts ==
Chart (1997)	Peak position
Scotland (OCC)	31
UK Singles (OCC)	50
