= Scruj MacDuhk =

- Origin: Winnipeg, Manitoba, Canada
- Genre: Folk
- Years active: 1995–2001
- Past members: Ruth Moody; Leonard Podolak

Scruj MacDuhk (stylized as Scrüj MacDuhk) was a Juno-nominated Canadian folk music group based in Winnipeg, Manitoba. The band included singer-songwriter Ruth Moody, current member of the Wailin' Jennys, and also banjo player/vocalist Leonard Podolak, who went on to form The Duhks.

== History ==
Scruj MacDuhk formed in 1995. In 1997 the band released an album, Live at the West End Cultural Centre, which was recorded in Winnipeg in May that year with the cooperation of CBC Manitoba. All five group members, including Moody, contributed to the vocals, and the album featured Podolak on 5-string banjo, Jeremy Penner on fiddle, Dan Baseley on accordion, tin whistle, and steel pan, Joel Fafard on guitar, and Gilles Fournier on bass. Guest musicians Geoff Butler on button accordions and Alistair Dennet on bodhran can also be heard on the album.

The band toured across Canada, including participation in the Stan Rogers Folk Festival, and released a second album, *The Road To Canso, through their label Scruj Tunes in 1999. The album featured Christian Dugas on percussion and guitar with some bass and feet. Moody contributed lead and backing vocals as well as piano and bodhran. Penner on fiddle and Podolak on 5-string banjo and bodhrán, also contributed some vocal work. Bassist Oliver Swain also sang and played mandolin on one tune, and Jeremy Walsh contributed guitar, whistle, and some vocal work.

In 2000 Scruj MacDuhk was presented with a Prairie Music Award for best independent album. The band broke up in 2001.

== Discography ==
- Live at the West End Cultural Centre

Track listing:
1. Roddy McCorley / Lost gander (traditional)
2. Walkin Boss / Cold Frosty Morning (traditional)
3. Oh No Not I (traditional)
4. Rocks of Bawn (traditional)
5. Alice in Frenfell (Joel Fafard)
6. Fierce Warmth (Joel Fafard)
7. Alan MacPherson of Dumbarton / Pretty Little Indian (traditional)
8. Banks of Red Roses (traditional)
9. Waiting for Nancy (Curtis Bouterse) / Aqua Marine One Step (Geoff Butler) / Paddy's Jig (traditional)

- The Road To Canso

1. Cidermill: Cidermill / The Colliers' Reel / Sadie at the Back Door* (Trad., arr. Sruj MacDuhk; * composed by Jere Canote)
2. The Rambling Irishman (Trad., arr. Sruj MacDuhk)
3. La Banqueroute* / La Reel St. Jean (Trad., arr. Sruj MacDuhk; * composed by Oscar Thiffault)
4. Silence They Say (Jeremy Walsh)
5. Nonsuch/Dinky's Reel/The Meech Lake Breakdown* (Trad., arr. Sruj MacDuhk; *composed by Emile Benoit)
6. The Maid Who Sold Her Barley / The Rakes of Kildare (Trad., arr. Sruj MacDuhk)
7. The Northern Set: Anderson's Rel / Alan MacPherson of Dumbarton / The Man From Dundoran (Trad., arr. Sruj MacDuhk)
8. Roddy McCorley / Lost Gander (Trad., arr. Sruj MacDuhk)
9. Things In Life (Don Stover)
10. Adventure Sings (Jeremy Walsh) / Louis Riel (Andy Desjarlais)
11. Cragie Hills (Trad., arr. Sruj MacDuhk)
12. The Road To Canso: A Thousand Roads (Geoff Butler) / The Road to Canso (Ruth Moody) / Hare O' The Dug (Alan MacLeod)
