= Rise (Annabelle Chvostek album) =

Studio album by Annabelle Chvostek
- Released: 2012
- Genre: Folk/Alternative
- Producer: Annabelle Chvostek

Annabelle Chvostek chronology
Resilience (2008)	Rise (2012)

Rise is an album released in 2013 by Annabelle Chvostek. The album was recorded with producer Don Kerr (Rheostatics) and mixed by Roma Baran (Laurie Anderson, Kate & Anna McGarrigle) and Vivian Stoll (Unknown Gender, Isis). It includes guest vocals from Oh Susanna and Canadian legend Bruce Cockburn. Other guests include Debashis Sinha of Autorickshaw, David Celia, Tony Spina and Jérémie Jones.

The album was nominated in the Roots & Traditional Album of the Year - Solo category of the 2013 Juno Awards.

== Track listing ==
1. End Of The Road (6:14)
2. G20 Song (4:32)
3. Baby Sleep Till Štúrovo (4:55)
4. The Will Of How (4:26)
5. All Have Some (4:41)
6. Fox Tail (4:05)
7. RISE (5:33)
8. Hartland Quay (4:27)
9. Do You Think You're Right (4:47)
10. Ona (3:10)
11. Some Kinda Love (4:18)
12. Equal Rights (6:48)
