= The Wailin' Jennys (EP) =

The Wailin' Jennys EP

EP by The Wailin' Jennys
- Released: 2003
- Recorded: Private Ear Recording, Winnipeg, Manitoba
- Genre: Folk
- Label: Red House
- Producer: David Travers-Smith

The Wailin' Jennys chronology
The Wailin' Jennys EP (2003)	40 Days (2004)

The Wailin' Jennys EP was the debut release from the eponymous Canadian folk trio. The lineup of the group at the time was Ruth Moody, Nicky Mehta, and Cara Luft; Luft has since left the group, being replaced first by Annabelle Chvostek and later by Heather Masse.

== Track listing ==
No.	Title	Writer(s)	Length
1.	"Come All You Sailors"	Cara Luft	3:57
2.	"Deeper Well"	David Olney, Daniel Lanois, Emmylou Harris	3:54
3.	"Sun's Gonna Rise"	Ruth Moody	4:28
4.	"Row Him Home"	Nicky Mehta	3:55
5.	"Bring Me L'il Water, Silvy"	John Lomax and Huddie Ledbetter	2:20
6.	"Bring 'Em All In"	Mike Scott	3:55
