= 40 Days =

Studio album by The Wailin' Jennys
- Released: August 10, 2004
- Recorded: Private Ear Recording, Winnipeg, Manitoba
- Genres: Folk rock Folk
- Label: Red House
- Producer: David Travers-Smith

The Wailin' Jennys chronology
The Wailin' Jennys EP (2003)	40 Days (2004)	Firecracker (2006)

Professional ratings
Review scores
Source	Rating
AllMusic	3.5/5 stars

40 Days is the debut full-length album from Canadian folk trio The Wailin' Jennys. The lineup of the group at the time was Ruth Moody, Nicky Mehta, and Cara Luft. This was the last recording to feature Luft, who left the group the following year.

Although the title, 40 Days appears as a line in the song "Something to Hold Onto", and traditionally has religious significance it was chosen for another reason. The title is actually the number of days it took the Jennys to record and refine the album and is a tribute to the experiences encountered during that time.

The album features three tracks contributed by each of the band's three songwriters and covers of Neil Young's "Old Man" and John Hiatt's "Take It Down". The group rounds out the collection with the traditional farewell, "The Parting Glass".

The album received the 2005 Juno Award for "Roots & Traditional Album of the Year by a Group".

In 2015, a cover of "One Voice" was recorded for the animal rights documentary film A Dog Named Gucci by Norah Jones, Aimee Mann, Susanna Hoffs, Lydia Loveless, Neko Case, Kathryn Calder, and Brian May.

== Track listing ==
No.	Title	Writer(s)	Length
1.	"One Voice"	Ruth Moody	3:21
2.	"Saucy Sailor"	(Traditional)	3:09
3.	"Arlington"	Nicky Mehta	4:52
4.	"Beautiful Dawn"	Ruth Moody	3:19
5.	"Untitled"	Cara Luft	4:25
6.	"This is Where"	Nicky Mehta	5:06
7.	"Old Man"	Neil Young	3:10
8.	"Heaven When We're Home"	Ruth Moody	4:22
9.	"Ten Mile Stilts"	Nicky Mehta	4:49
10.	"Come All You Sailors"	Cara Luft	4:01
11.	"Take it Down"	John Hiatt	3:51
12.	"Something to Hold Onto"	Cara Luft	3:40
13.	"The Parting Glass"	(Traditional)	2:20
Total length:			50:25

== Personnel ==
The Wailin' Jennys:

- Cara Luft - vocals, acoustic guitar (2, 3, 4, 5, 6, 7, 8, 10, 12), electric guitar (9), dobro (11)
- Nicky Mehta - vocals, acoustic guitar (3, 6, 9, 12), harmonica (4, 11), cajón (2)
- Ruth Moody - vocals, acoustic guitar (1, 4, 8, 11), bodhran (2, 5, 10), piano (9), organ (6), accordion (12)

Additional musical contributions:

- Kevin Breit - electric guitar (6), dobro (4), mandolin (1), mandocello (1)
- Andrew Downing - acoustic bass (1, 3, 6, 9, 10, 11, 12)
- Christian Dugas - drums and percussion on "Beautiful Dawn"
- Mark Mariash - drums (3, 6, 9, 10, 11, 12), percussion (3, 6, 9, 11, 12), additional percussion on "Beautiful Dawn"
- Richard Moody - viola (3, 5), fiddle (8)
- David Travers-Smith - organ (5, 11), trumpet (3), piano guts (5)
