= Fréchet (disambiguation) =

René Maurice Fréchet (1878–1973) was a French mathematician.

Fréchet may also refer to:

== People ==
- Jean Fréchet (born 1944), American chemist and academic
- René-Arthur Fréchet (1879–1950), Canadian architect

== Places ==
- Le Fréchet a commune in Haute-Garonne, France
- Fréchet-Aure, a commune in Hautes-Pyrénées, France
- Fréchou-Fréchet, a commune in Hautes-Pyrénées, France

== Other uses ==
- 21537 Fréchet, a minor planet

== See also ==
- Cazaux-Fréchet-Anéran-Camors, Hautes-Pyrénées, France
- Frechette (disambiguation)
