= Rare, Precious and Gone =

Single by Mike Scott

from the album Still Burning
- Released: 1998
- Length: 4:06
- Label: Chrysalis
- Songwriter: Mike Scott
- Producers: Mike Scott, Niko Bolas

Mike Scott singles chronology
| "Love Anyway" (1997) | "Rare, Precious and Gone" (1998) | "Questions" (1998) |

"Rare, Precious and Gone" is a song by Scottish singer-songwriter Mike Scott, released as the second single from his second solo album Still Burning. It was written by Mike Scott, and produced by Scott and Niko Bolas. "Rare, Precious and Gone" reached No. 74 on the UK Singles Chart in February 1998.

Scott wrote "Rare, Precious and Gone" in 1986 at Lotts Lane in Dublin, but it was not recorded until sessions for Still Burning. A live version of the song, recorded for Virgin Radio in September 1997, was included on the 1998 compilation The Whole of the Moon: The Music of Mike Scott and the Waterboys.

== Music video ==
A music video was filmed in a video booth at Heathrow Airport, while Scott and his band were waiting to board a flight to Japan. Scott had initially intended to have his photo taken "for a laugh" when he discovered the booth actually recorded videos, which gave him the idea of recording a £5 music video for his upcoming single. He had the track play on his cassette player as he mimed to the track, then packaged and sent the result to Chrysalis. In his autobiography, Scott recalled: "Within a week it had been shown on several TV shows, exceeding the combined broadcast tally of the last three £50,000 videos I'd done for Chrysalis and Geffen. But even this exposure, and the dubious distinction of having made a video for a fiver, couldn't propel a Mike Scott song into the charts in 1997."

== Critical reception ==
Upon its release as a single, the Birmingham Evening Mail picked "Rare, Precious and Gone" as their "single of the week" and praised it as a "masterpiece in miniature from the former Waterboy". They added, "His trademark vocal all but caresses the song, which offers the best of his influences all in one instantly accessible package." In a review of Still Burning, Caroline Sullivan of The Guardian noted, "There's a new soulishness bestowed by Chicago guitarist Chris Bruce. Go directly to 'Rare, Precious and Gone' for coffee-table funk, then get over the shock on the acoustic 'Open'." The Scottish Music Network wrote, "Tracks such as 'Rare, Precious and Gone' rekindle the brass driven power of yesteryear, but most of all the dynamic electric guitars are a delight." James F. Laverty of The Phantom Tollbooth commented, "Scott may have left the 'Big Music' behind with the Eighties, but he still enjoys strings and trumpets when they're called for on songs like 'Love Anyway' and 'Rare, Precious and Gone'."

== Formats ==
CD single (UK #1)
| No. | Title | Length |
|---|---|---|
| 1. | "Rare, Precious and Gone" | 4:04 |
| 2. | "Kiss the Wind" | 3:07 |
| 3. | "When Will We Be Married?" | 2:26 |
| 4. | "Love Anyway (Full Length Demo)" | 6:40 |

CD single (UK #2)
| No. | Title | Length |
|---|---|---|
| 1. | "Rare, Precious and Gone" | 4:04 |
| 2. | "All the Things She Gave Me (XFM Version)" | 4:04 |
| 3. | "She Is So Beautiful (Live)" | 4:01 |
| 4. | "Nectar (7 Days)" | 3:24 |

CD single (UK promo)
| No. | Title | Length |
|---|---|---|
| 1. | "Rare, Precious and Gone" | 4:04 |

== Personnel ==
Rare, Precious and Gone

- Mike Scott - lead vocals, rhythm guitar
- Ian McNabb - backing vocals
- Chris Bruce - lead guitar
- James Hallawell - organ
- The Kick Horns, The Memphis Horns - horns
- Pino Palladino - bass
- Jim Keltner - drums
- Preston Heyman - percussion

Production

- Mike Scott - producer (all tracks)
- Niko Bolas - producer, recording and engineer on "Rare, Precious and Gone"
- Chris Blair - mastering on "Rare, Precious and Gone"
- Chris Sheldon - mixing on "Rare, Precious and Gone"

Other

- Bruce Fisher at Sold Out - design
- Mary Scanlon - photography

== Charts ==
| Chart (1998) | Peak position |
|---|---|
| Scottish Singles Sales (Official Charts) | 47 |
| UK Singles (Official Charts) | 74 |
