= Ned Bouhalassa =

Canadian composer

- Born: 25 August 1962 (age 64); Le Mans, France
- Occupations: Canadian composer of electroacoustic music, film scores, and television scores

Ned Bouhalassa (born 25 August 1962 in Le Mans, France) is a composer of film scores, television scores, and electroacoustic music. Bouhalassa is a Canadian citizen, and has been living in Montreal since 1967.

In 1993, he began composing television soundtracks, and has been writing music for image full-time since 1997. His music has been heard in international television series such as 18 to Life, 15/Love, and Dogs with Jobs, as well as in independent feature films including Jack & Ella, Evil Words, These Girls, starring David Boreanaz, and On the Verge of a Fever (Le Goût des jeunes filles).

A student of composer Francis Dhomont at l'université de Montréal, and professor Kevin Austin at Concordia University, Montreal, he has been composing electroacoustic music since 1987. Regularly programmed at Montreal's Elektra and Réseaux festivals, his concert music has also been heard around the world. Since the late 1990s, he has been exploring hybridization by combining electronic beats with electroacoustic soundscapes, and more recently, he has been interested in collaborating with video artists and writing works for surround-sound systems.

Bouhalassa received first prize in the electroacoustic category of the 1990 SOCAN Young Composer's Competition, third prize in the 1993 Luigi Russolo International Competition, and was a finalist in the 1995 Noroit-Léonce Petitot Acousmatic Competition.

== Film Scores ==
- Secrets Of The Dead: Ultimate Tutankhamun (2013)
- Who Is Simon Miller? (2011)
- What Sank Titanic? (2011)
- Flesh Offering (2009)
- Un Cargo pour l'Afrique (2009)
- Carny (2009)
- Rise of the Gargoyles (2008)
- The Unsinkable Titanic (2008)
- Infected (2008)
- S & M: Short and Male (2007)
- Ou vas-tu Moshe? (2007)
- Banshee (2006)
- These Girls (2005)
- On the Verge of a Fever (Le Goût des jeunes filles) (2004)
- Evil Words (Sur le seuil) (2003)
- Jack & Ella (2002)
- Home (2002)
- Ne dis rien (2000)
- Arrival 2 (1998)
- Backroads (1997)
- Invasion of the Beer People (1996)
- Icebreaker to the North Pole (1996)

== Television series ==
- O'
- 18 to Life
- In Real Life
- Hakuna Matata
- 15/Love
- Fries With That?
- Dogs with Jobs
- Back To Sherwood
- Tornado Alley
- Visez dans le mille
- Jumbo: The Plane that Changed the World

== Electroacoustic Works ==
- The Lighthouse (2005), videomusic; with Khrystell Burlin (video)
- Songe errant (2005)
- Urban Cuts (2005), cello, drums and 5.1 audio; with Fortner Anderson (text)
- Blur (2001–03)
- mOrpheus (2003)
- Bija (2000); with Annabelle Chvostek
- Impulse (1999)
- Jets (1996–98)
- Brouillard (1997)
- Constamment (autoportrait) (1997)
- Éclipse (1996)
- Move 1 (1994)
- Attraction (1992–93)
- Le désir fauve (1991)
- Bouffée délirante (1990)

== Recordings ==
- Gratte-Cité (empreintes DIGITALes, IMED 0895, 2008)
- Aérosol (empreintes DIGITALes, IMED 9840, 1998)
