= Migrations (album) =

Studio album by The Duhks
- Released: September 2006
- Genre: Folk
- Length: 39:39
- Label: Sugar Hill
- Producer: Tim O'Brien and Gary Paczosa

The Duhks chronology
The Duhks (2005)	Migrations (2006)	The Duhks at the Backdoor Theater (2008)

Migrations is a 2006 album by The Duhks. It is released under the Sugar Hill Records label.

== Track listing ==
1. Ol' Cook Pot (Shawn Byrne / Chuck McCarthy)
2. Mountains o' Things (Tracy Chapman)
3. Heaven's My Home (Ruby Amanfu/Katie Herzig)
4. The Fox and the Bee (Tania Elizabith; Jordan McConnell; traditional arr. The Duhks)
5. Down to the River / Jeb's Tune - (Keith Frank [words by Leonard Podolak]; Jeb Puryear)
6. Who Will Take My Place? (Dan Frechette)
7. Moses Don't Get Lost (Traditional arr. The Duhks; words by Tim O'Brien)
8. Three Fishers (Public Domain arr. The Duhks)
9. Domino Party! — Laine's Jig / Close To The Floor / The Domino Party / The Musical Party (Leonard Podolak; Tania Elizabeth)
10. Out of the Rain (Jessee Havey)
11. Turtle Dove (Traditional arr. The Duhks)

== Production ==
- Co-produced by Tim O'Bryen and Gary Paczosa
- Recorded by Gary Paczosa at Omni Studios and Minutia
- Mixed by Gary Paczosa at Minutia
- Assistant Engineers: Brandon Bell and Bob Ingison
- Mastered by Doug Sax and Robert Hadley, The Mastering Lab, Hollywood, CA

== Personnel ==
- Tania Elizabeth - fiddle, harmony vocals
- Jessee Havey - lead vocals, harmony vocals
- Jordan McConnell - guitar, harmony vocals
- Leonard Podolak - claw-hammer banjo, lead vocals (Down to the River)
- Scott Senior - pandeiro, cajob, congas, bongo, surdo, djembe, shakers, bells, cymbals, pots and pans

Guests

- Tim O'Brien - bouzouki, harmony vocals, electric guitar, mandolin
- Katie Herzig - harmony vocals
- Luke Bulla - harmony vocals
