= Fifteen (The Wailin' Jennys album) =

Studio album by The Wailin' Jennys
- Released: October 27, 2017
- Recorded: February 2017
- Label: Red House
- Producer: The Wailin' Jennys

The Wailin' Jennys chronology
iTunes Session (2011)	Fifteen (2017)

Fifteen is the fifth full-length album from Canadian folk trio The Wailin' Jennys. The nine-song album of covers commemorates the trio's fifteen years as a recording entity. The songs are a combination of ones played during their concerts and those decided during the five–day recording session.

== Track listing ==
No.	Title	Writer(s)	Length
1.	"Old Churchyard"	traditional	3:15
2.	"Wildflowers"	Tom Petty	3:42
3.	"The Valley"	Jane Siberry	5:48
4.	"Light of a Clear Blue Morning"	Dolly Parton	4:27
5.	"Loves Me Like a Rock"	Paul Simon	2:26
6.	"Boulder to Birmingham"	Emmylou Harris	3:20
7.	"Not Alone"	Patty Griffin	4:39
8.	"Keep Me In Your Heart"	Warren Zevon	3:37
9.	"Weary Blues from Waitin'"	Hank Williams	3:13

== Personnel ==
- Ruth Moody – vocals, banjo, guitar
- Heather Masse – vocals
- Nicky Mehta – vocals, guitar
- Sam Howard – upright bass
- Richard Moody – viola, violin, mandolin
- Adam Dobres – acoustic and electric guitars, mandolin
- Adrian Dolan – violin

== Charts ==
Chart (2017)	Peak position
US Top Bluegrass Albums (Billboard)	1
US Americana/Folk Albums (Billboard)	12
US Independent Albums (Billboard)	17
