= Building the City of Light =

Single by Mike Scott

from the album Bring 'Em All In
- B-side: "Where Do You Want the Boombox, Buddy?"
- Released: 30 October 1995
- Length: 3:52
- Label: Chrysalis
- Songwriter: Mike Scott
- Producers: Mike Scott, Niko Bolas

Mike Scott singles chronology
"Bring 'Em All In" (1995)	"Building the City of Light" (1995)	"Love Anyway" (1997)

"Building the City of Light" is a song from Scottish singer-songwriter Mike Scott, released by Chrysalis Records on 30 October 1995 as the second and final single from his debut solo album, Bring 'Em All In (1995). It was written by Mike Scott, and produced by Scott and Niko Bolas. The song reached No. 60 in the UK Singles Chart and remained in the top 100 for two weeks.

== Background ==
Much of the material on Bring 'Em All In was written after Scott left New York City for Scotland in 1993. During a period when he stayed at the Findhorn Foundation, he wrote many of the songs that appeared on the album and first performed "Building the City of Light", among other tracks, at the foundation's Universal Hall. At the time of its release, Scott described "Building the City of Light" as "a three and a half minute power blast with lyrics about bringing more love into the world, starting with myself".

When the previous single "Bring 'Em All In" stalled at No. 56 in the UK, Chrysalis persuaded Scott to release "Building the City of Light" with different bonus tracks on two separate CD releases in the bid to generate additional sales and a hit single. In his autobiography, Scott recalled how he felt the plan was merely a "music business ploy" and a "scam". With "Building the City of Light" only reaching No. 60 in the UK, Scott recalled: "The single bombed and I felt I'd compromised myself, the fans and the music."

== Music video ==
The song's music video was directed by Scott and David Anderson, and produced by Elizabeth Flowers.

== Critical reception ==
Upon its release as a single, David Stubbs of Melody Maker was negative in his review, calling the song "a big, clumsy, even cheesier retread of 'The Whole of the Moon'", with Scott "working furiously away like some euphoric born-again Christian on the point of putting a hole in his tambourine". He continued, "You can see the way this clapped-out, half-arsed, deluded, would-be Celtic mystic's leaky mind is working here. Put all these worthy, real, virtuous-sounding things in the same pot and how could you fail to come up with anything other than a good single? Ah, but there's a difference between good things and a mere list of good things."

In a review of Bring 'Em All In, Kevin O'Hare, writing for the Star Tribune, described the song as a "fiery closer". Dan Bennett of the North County Times wrote, "On songs such as 'Sensitive Children' and 'Building the City of Light', Scott has attempted to fashion a complete observational and self-realization journey in one package." Trouser Press commented, "...Scott is still carried away with his new age idealism: the lyrics of 'Long Way to the Light' and 'Building the City of Light' are both so insufferably earnest and overpoweringly positive that they distract all attention away from any merits the music might have." Chuck Groth of the St. Louis Post-Dispatch felt "Building the City of Light" was one of the album's tracks that was "forced and melodramatic".

== Formats ==
7" single
No.	Title	Length
1.	"Building the City of Light"	3:52
2.	"Where Do You Want the Boombox, Buddy?"	2:21

CD single (UK #1)
No.	Title	Length
1.	"Building the City of Light"	3:52
2.	"Where Do You Want the Boombox, Buddy?"	2:21
3.	"Goin' Back to Glasters (Live)"	3:46
4.	"The Whole of the Moon (Live)"	4:04

CD single (UK #2)
No.	Title	Length
1.	"Building the City of Light"	3:52
2.	"Two Great Waves"	5:25
3.	"My Beautiful Guide"	2:34
4.	"Building the City of Light (Universal Hall Demo)"	4:03

CD single (UK promo)
No.	Title	Length
1.	"Building the City of Light"	3:52

CD single (US promo)
No.	Title	Length
1.	"Building the City of Light"	3:52
2.	"Where Do You Want the Boombox, Buddy?"	2:21
3.	"Bleecker Street"	1:52
4.	"This Morning I Am Born Again"	1:40
5.	"Goin' Back to Glasters (Live)"	3:46

== Personnel ==
Building the City of Light

- Mike Scott - all vocals and instruments, producer
- Niko Bolas - producer, recording, engineering, mixing
- Greg Calbi, Scott Hull - mastering

Where Do You Want the Boombox, Buddy?

- Mike Scott - producer
- Chris Bruce - lead guitar
- Brian Stanley - bass
- Steve Holley - drums
- Niko Bolas - recording, mixing

Other

- Mike Scott - cover concept
- Jill Furmanovsky - photography
- Stylorouge - design

== Charts ==
Chart (1995)	Peak position
Scotland Singles (OCC)	46
UK Singles (OCC)	60
