= Tracker (album) =

Studio album by Mark Knopfler
- Released: 16 March 2015
- Studio: British Grove Studios, Chiswick, West London
- Genre: Rock, folk
- Length: 60:40
- Label: Mercury, Verve (US)
- Producer: Mark Knopfler

Mark Knopfler chronology
Privateering (2012)	Tracker (2015)	Altamira (2016)

Tracker is the eighth solo studio album by the British singer-songwriter and guitarist Mark Knopfler, released on 16 March 2015 (17 March 2015 in North America).

== Release ==
Tracker was released on CD, double vinyl, deluxe CD with four bonus tracks, and a box set with the album on both CD and vinyl formats and a bonus CD with six extra tracks and a DVD with a short film directed by Henrik Hansen and an interview with Knopfler.

== Touring ==
Knopfler promoted the album on his Tracker Tour, which started on 15 May 2015 in Dublin, Ireland. The tour included 86 concerts in two legs — Europe and North America — and ended on 31 October 2015 in Fort Lauderdale, Florida, in the United States.

== Critical response ==
Professional ratings
Aggregate scores
Source	Rating
Metacritic	70/100
Review scores
Source	Rating
AllMusic	3.5/5 stars
American Songwriter	4/5 stars
Boston Globe	Positive
The Guardian	3/5 stars
Popmatters	6/10 stars
Rolling Stone	3.5/5 stars
The Telegraph	3/5 stars

According to the review aggregator website Metacritic, Tracker received generally favorable reviews, achieving a critical score of 70 based on 15 critic reviews. In his review for AllMusic, Stephen Thomas Erlewine gave the album three and a half out of five stars, noting that the album is "scaled smaller" than his previous double-album effort Privateering, "easing its way into being instead of announcing itself with a thunder". Erlewine writes:

Tracker feels quieter than his new millennial norm. Some of this is due to the undercurrent of reflection tugging at the record's momentum. Knopfler isn't pining for the past but he is looking back, sometimes wistfully, sometimes with a resigned smile, and he appropriately draws upon sounds that he's long loved.

Erlewine concludes that the "skillful interweaving of Knopfler's personal past helps give Tracker a nicely gentle resonance".

In his review for American Songwriter, Hal Horowitz gave the album four out of five stars, observing:

Touches of Celtic, jazz, country and folk, but seldom rock, inform these lovely tunes that take their time as if on a leisurely stroll ... He's in no hurry telling these colorful stories that unspool slowly and deliberately. Like much of Van Morrison's best work, the relaxed pace provides the consistent thread that makes this a cohesive album instead of a batch of songs.

Horowitz concludes that the album's "softly dignified pace, immaculately constructed lyrics and especially the immediately identifiable slithering guitar lines" all work to create "timeless songs that feel organic, measured and are clearly heartfelt as Knopfler crafts music that will sound as magnificent in 50 years as it does today."

Ken Capobianco, in his review for the Boston Globe, gave the album a positive review, writing, "Mark Knopfler continues his late-career resurgence with this skillfully crafted eighth solo effort, revealing a portrait gallery of quotidian and accomplished lives marked by yearning and reflection." Capobianco praised Knopfler's overall effort "delivering finely wrought, elegantly arranged songs of subtle depth and rich musicality". In his review for Rolling Stone, Will Hermes gave the album three and a half out of five stars, calling it "modest" and "multifaceted". Hermes noted, "Knopfler's quicksilver guitar is understated, and he delivers stories of stoic ache like an old watchmaker on a pub stool—quietly riveting."

In his review for The Telegraph, Neil McCormick gave the album three out of five stars, acknowledging the work's "understated refinement", but noting it "lacks the epic scope of Dire Straits". According to McCormick, there is a predictability to the album that undermines its effectiveness, noting, "Fans will find much to enjoy here, but it might be time for Knopfler to push himself out of his comfort zone." Ally Carnwath, in her review for The Guardian, also gave the album three out of five stars, observing a "predictable whiff of whiskey and rolling tobacco" about the effort. While Carnwarth notes Knopfler's inconsistency as a storyteller, she believes his music "remains a reliable source of warm bluesy guitarwork". In his review for Popmatters, John Garrett gave the album six out of ten stars, concluding, "It’s hard to nail down a specific identity for Tracker. The quality of each song is consistently good, but the album doesn't feel very cohesive when you step back to consider the whole package."

== Track listing ==
All songs written by Mark Knopfler.

Disc one, standard

No.	Title	Length
1.	"Laughs and Jokes and Drinks and Smokes"	6:40
2.	"Basil" (featuring Ruth Moody)	5:45
3.	"River Towns"	6:17
4.	"Skydiver" (featuring Ruth Moody)	4:38
5.	"Mighty Man"	5:55
6.	"Broken Bones"	5:30
7.	"Long Cool Girl" (featuring Ruth Moody)	5:06
8.	"Lights of Taormina"	6:09
9.	"Silver Eagle"	5:02
10.	"Beryl"	3:11
11.	"Wherever I Go" (featuring Ruth Moody)	6:27
12.	"Hot Dog" (bonus track only at Mediamarkt and Saturn in Germany)	2:53

Disc two, bonus tracks

No.	Title	Length
1.	".38 Special" (deluxe + box set)	2:47
2.	"My Heart Has Never Changed" (deluxe + box set + featuring Ruth Moody)	3:49
3.	"Terminal of Tribute To" (deluxe + box set)	5:52
4.	"Heart of Oak" (deluxe + box set)	1:46
5.	"Time Will End All Sorrow" (box set)	2:59
6.	"Oklahoma Ponies" (box set; traditional melody, lyrics and arrangement by Mark Knopfler)	5:19

== Personnel ==
- Mark Knopfler – vocals, guitar
- Guy Fletcher – keyboards, vocals
- Bruce Molsky – fiddle, rhythm guitar, banjo
- John McCusker – fiddle, cittern
- Michael McGoldrick – whistle, wooden flute
- Phil Cunningham – accordion
- Richard Bennett – guitars
- Glenn Worf – bass guitar
- Ian Thomas – drums
- Nigel Hitchcock – saxophone
- Tom Walsh – trumpet
- Ruth Moody – vocals

Production

- Mark Knopfler – producer
- Guy Fletcher – producer
- Richard Ford – sleeve notes

== Charts ==
=== Weekly charts ===
Chart (2015)	Peak position
Australian Albums (ARIA)	12
Austrian Albums (Ö3 Austria)	1
Belgian Albums (Ultratop Flanders)	1
Belgian Albums (Ultratop Wallonia)	3
Croatian International Albums (HDU)	1
Danish Albums (Hitlisten)	1
Dutch Albums (Album Top 100)	1
Finnish Albums (Suomen virallinen lista)	5
French Albums (SNEP)	6
German Albums (Offizielle Top 100)	1
Hungarian Albums (MAHASZ)	5
Irish Albums (IRMA)	5
Italian Albums (FIMI)	3
New Zealand Albums (RMNZ)	4
Norwegian Albums (VG-lista)	1
Portuguese Albums (AFP)	2
Spanish Albums (Promusicae)	2
Swedish Albums (Sverigetopplistan)	3
Swiss Albums (Schweizer Hitparade)	2
UK Albums (OCC)	3
US Billboard 200	14
US Americana/Folk Albums (Billboard)	1
US Top Rock Albums (Billboard)	2

=== Year-end charts ===
Chart (2015)	Position
Austrian Albums (Ö3 Austria)	69
Belgian Albums (Ultratop Flanders)	53
Belgian Albums (Ultratop Wallonia)	56
Dutch Albums (Album Top 100)	18
French Albums (SNEP)	106
German Albums (Offizielle Top 100)	22
Italian Albums (FIMI)	62
New Zealand Albums (RMNZ)	39
Spanish Albums (PROMUSICAE)	77
Swiss Albums (Schweizer Hitparade)	24
US Top Rock Albums (Billboard)	61

== Certifications ==
Region	Certification	Certified units/sales
Austria (IFPI Austria)	Gold	7,500^{*}
Germany (BVMI)	Gold	100,000^{‡}
Poland (ZPAV)	Platinum	20,000^{‡}
Switzerland (IFPI Switzerland)	Gold	10,000^{^}
United Kingdom (BPI)	Silver	60,000^{‡}
^{*} Sales figures based on certification alone.^{^} Shipments figures based on certification alone.^{‡} Sales+streaming figures based on certification alone.
