= Firecracker (The Wailin' Jennys album) =

Studio album by The Wailin' Jennys
- Released: June 6, 2006
- Recorded: Fall of 2005
- Genre: Folk
- Label: Festival
- Producer: David Travers-Smith

The Wailin' Jennys chronology
40 Days (2004)	Firecracker (2006)	Live at the Mauch Chunk Opera House (2009)

Professional ratings
Review scores
Source	Rating
AllMusic	4/5 stars

Firecracker is the second album by The Wailin' Jennys.

The album was rated the #2 folk album of 2006 in North America by total airplay, and the #1 Canadian album. The initial track, "The Devil's Paintbrush Road" by Annabelle Chvostek, was rated the #1 Canadian song for 2006 by total airplay.

The album was nominated for the 2007 Juno Award for "Roots and Traditional Album of the Year by a Group" and for "Contemporary Folk Album of the Year" by the North American Folk Alliance.

== Track listing ==
1. "The Devil's Paintbrush Road" (Annabelle Chvostek)
2. "Glory Bound" (Ruth Moody)
3. "Begin" (Nicky Mehta)
4. "Things That You Know" (Ruth Moody)
5. "Swallow" (Annabelle Chvostek)
6. "Starlight" (Nicky Mehta)
7. "Apocalypse Lullaby" (Annabelle Chvostek)
8. "This Heart of Mine" (Ruth Moody)
9. "Long Time Traveller" (Traditional) (Composed as the hymn tune "White" by Edmund Dumas)
10. "Avila" (Nicky Mehta)
11. "Some Good Thing" (Nicky Mehta)
12. "Prairie Town" (Ruth Moody)
13. "Firecracker" (Annabelle Chvostek)

== Personnel ==
- Annabelle Chvostek: Vocals, acoustic guitar, mandolin, violin
- Nicky Mehta: Vocals, acoustic guitar, harmonica
- Ruth Moody: Vocals, acoustic guitar, accordion, banjo

With:

- Christian Dugas: Drums
- Joe Phillips: Acoustic bass
- Mike Hardwick: Acoustic and electric guitars, dobro
- Kevin Breit: Electric guitar, National guitar, dobro, mandolin
- Richard Moody: Viola, violin
- Mark Mariash: Tambourine and additional drums
- Andrew Downing: Acoustic bass
- John Dymond: Electric bass
- Grant Johnson: Electric bass
- Jeremy Penner: Violin
- Brian McMillan: Electric and acoustic guitars
- Justin Abedin: Electric guitar
- David Travers-Smith: Trumpet, E-flat peck horn, Hammond M3 organ, percussion
