= The Duhks (album) =

Studio album by The Duhks
- Released: February 8, 2005
- Length: 64:15
- Label: Sugar Hill Records
- Producer: Béla Fleck and Gary Paczosa

The Duhks chronology
Your Daughters & Your Sons (2003)	The Duhks (2005)	Migrations (2006)

Professional ratings
Review scores
Source	Rating
Music Box	3/5 stars

The Duhks is the second studio album by the group The Duhks. It is released under the Sugar Hill Records label.

== Track listing ==
No.	Title	Writer(s)	Length
1.	"Death Came a Knockin'"
2.	"Mists of Down Below"
3.	"Gene's Machine"
4.	"Four Blue Walls"	Ruth Ungar
5.	"The Wagoner's Lad"
6.	"True Religion"
7.	"The Magnolia Set"
8.	"You and I"
9.	"Everybody Knows"	Leonard Cohen
10.	"Dance Hall Girls"
11.	"The Dregs of Birch"
12.	"Du temps que j'etais jeune"
13.	"Dover, Delaware"

Bonus track
No.	Title	Writer(s)	Length
14.	"Love Is the Seventh Wave"	Sting

== Personnel ==
- Leonard Podolak – banjo and vocals
- Tania Elizabeth – fiddle and vocals
- Jordan McConnell – guitar and vocals
- Jessee Havey – lead vocals
- Scott Senior – percussion
