= Your Daughters & Your Sons =

Studio album by The Duhks
- Released: June 10, 2003
- Recorded: May 2002, Winnipeg, Manitoba, Canada
- Genre: folk
- Length: 48:54
- Label: Sugar Hill Records
- Producer: Mark Schatz

The Duhks chronology
Your Daughters & Your Sons (2003)	The Duhks (2005)

Your Daughters & Your Sons is the first studio album by The Duhks. Originally independent, the album is now released under the Sugar Hill Records label. The album focuses primarily on Irish folk music.

== Track listing ==
1. "The Green Fields of Glentown/Le Reel des Nouveaux Mariés/Flash Away the Pressing Gang" (Tommy Peoples/traditional/traditional) - 4:25
2. "Rock of Ages" (Gillian Welch-David Rawlings) - 2:59
3. "Giuliano's Tune/Something/Eleanor Day's #2" (Leonard Podolak/Tania Elizabeth, Adrian Dolan/Leonard Podolak) - 3:23
4. "Annabel" (Kat Goldman) - 4:23
5. "Crusty Rolls & Chili: An Buachaillin Ban/Jimmy Ward's Jig/Charlie Lennon's/The Crib of Perches" (traditional) - 5:00
6. "Le Meunier et La Jeune Fille/Les Quatre Fer en l'Air" (traditional/Michel Bordeleau) - 3:17
7. "The Leather Winged Bat" (traditional) - 4:00
8. "The Trooper and the Maid" (traditional) - 2:45
9. "The Seine River Waltz/Anna William's Reel/The Newfoundland Reel" (Jordan McConnell, Tania Elizabeth/Leonard Podolak/traditional) - 5:07
10. "Pretty Boy Floyd/Stoney Point" (Woody Guthrie/traditional) - 3:42
11. "The Bantry Girls Lament/The Ol' Yellow House" (traditional / Leonard Podolak) - 5:24
12. "Your Daughters and Your Sons/Jean's Reel" (Tommy Sands / Bobby McCloud) - 4:22

== Personnel ==
- Leonard Podolak – banjo and vocals
- Tania Elizabeth – fiddle and vocals
- Jordan McConnell – guitar and vocals
- Jessee Havey – vocals
