= Jeffery Straker =

Canadian folk/roots singer-songwriter

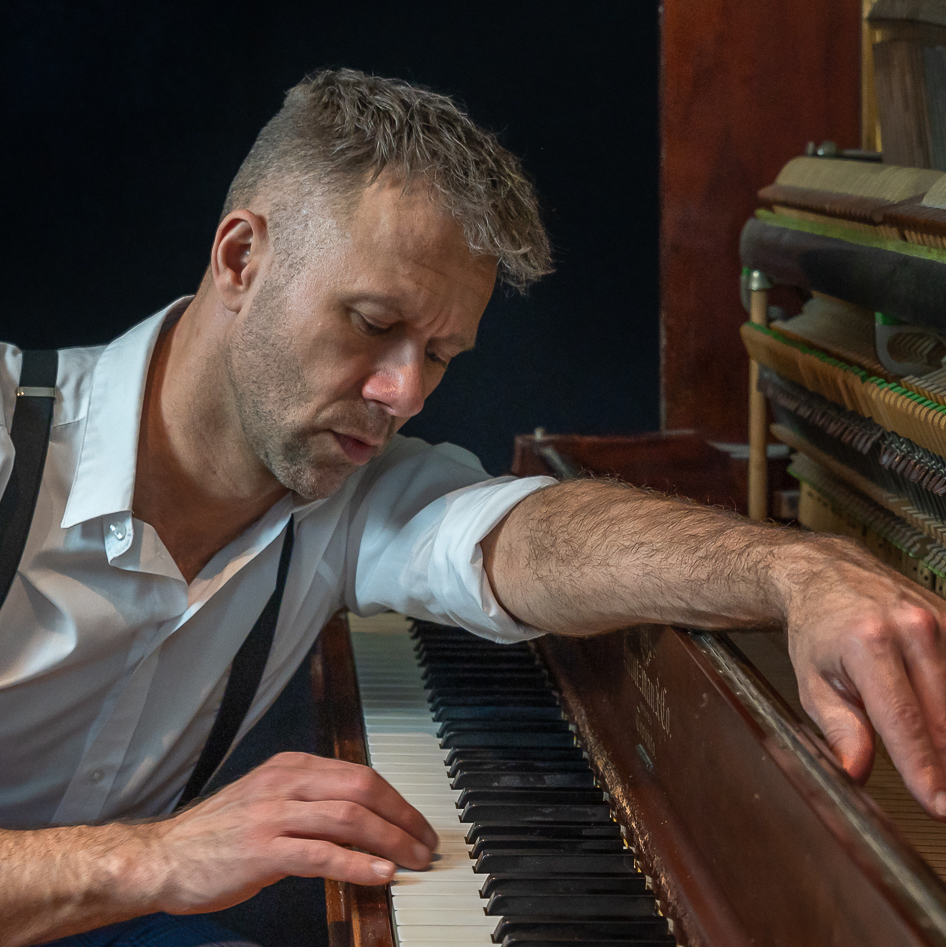
- Jeffery Straker photographed by Peter Scoular

Background information
- Origin: Punnichy, Saskatchewan, Canada
- Genres: Singer-songwriter, Folk
- Occupations: Singer, songwriter, musician
- Instruments: Piano, vocals
- Years active: 2006–present
- Website: jeffstraker.com

Jeffery Straker is a Canadian folk/roots singer-songwriter, based in Punnichy, Saskatchewan. His piano-based folk/roots musical style has drawn comparisons to Kris Kristofferson, Elton John, Neil Young, and Rufus Wainwright

== Biography ==
=== Early life ===
Jeffery Straker was raised on a grain farm near Punnichy, Saskatchewan, and grew up in a musical household. He started piano lessons with local music teacher Mrs Vicky Young and was subsequently taught by Dawn MacTavish. Further piano studies were pursued with Frank Crumly at the Conservatory of Music, University of Regina in his senior years of high school earning his Licentiate diploma from Trinity College London when he was 19. Straker attended the University of Saskatchewan (Saskatoon, Saskatchewan) earning a Bachelor of Science (Hons) in Biology. His third year of university studies was at Queen's University Belfast (Northern Ireland).

== Career ==
Straker independently released his album Songs from Highway 15 in 2006. The folk-pop album contains 10 songs inspired by people and places in Saskatchewan. It was recorded live with engineer Brian Moncarz in Toronto. Canadian singer-songwriter Kat Goldman sang backing vocals on the album.

In 2008, Straker released his follow-up album Step Right Up, which included the singles "Hypnotized" and "Somewhere Between". A music video for "Hypnotized" was played on MuchMoreMusic across Canada. Step Right Up was re-released on MDM/Universal in 2010. The album was produced by Justin Gray in Toronto and Los Angeles.

In 2011, Straker released the album under the soles of my shoes, produced by Dave Thomson in Nashville. The recording was mixed by Grammy Award winning engineer Chad Carlson.

Straker released a 9-song studio album, Vagabond, on 2 October 2012. The album was produced by Danny Michel. Piano tracks were recorded at the Canadian Broadcasting Centre in Toronto in studio 211, using Glenn Gould's Steinway & Sons grand piano. Fred Penner performed harmonica on the song "Birchbark Canoe".

In 2014 the recording Live with CBC Radio was released. It was recorded by CBC Radio in the Mae Wilson Theatre in Moose Jaw, Saskatchewan.

In 2015 Jeffery released North Star Falling produced by Dean Drouillard. The album debuted in the top 10 of the iTunes singer-songwriter charts in its first 2 weeks.

In May 2017, Straker released "Dirt Road Confessional", a 12 song recording with roots-folk influenced arrangements and instrumentation. The album was produced in 5 different studios by several producers: Daniel Ledwell (Lake Echo, Nova Scotia); Royal Wood and Lawrence Katz (Los Angeles, California); Dean Drouillard (Toronto, Ontario); Brad Prosko and Murray Pulver (Regina, Saskatchewan); Robyn Dell'Unto (Toronto, Ontario). The album contains 2 songs co-written with Royal Wood and Lawrence Katz, a song co-written with Jay Semko, and a co-write with Karen Kosowski.

May 2021 saw the release of the 10-song LP "Just Before Sunrise". Production was by Russell Broom (Calgary AB) who also played guitars and banjo on the recording. Two songs were produced by Royal Wood in Toronto ON. The recording tied for the #2 spot in the "Best Saskatchewan Albums of 2021" ranking

Straker was named Roots/Folk Artist of the Year in both the 2020 and 2021 Saskatchewan Music Awards. He tours over 100 shows each year and performed his sold out orchestral debut with the Regina Symphony Orchestra in Regina Saskatchewan, October 2011. He has performed subsequent orchestral concerts of his work with the Saskatoon Symphony Orchestra in October 2013 and 2018 and the Sudbury Symphony Orchestra in 2015. Jeffery was the winner of the international category of the 55th Vina del Mar International Song Festival (Chile) in February 2014 with his song Hypnotized. The singer-pianist is a regular national cast member of the long running telethon Telemiracle produced by the Kin Canada (Kinsmen and Kinettes) of Saskatchewan, Canada. The telethon is broadcast on CTV.

At the 20th Canadian Folk Music Awards, he won the award for Contemporary Singer of the Year for his album Great Big Sky.

== Discography ==
- Songs from Highway 15 (2006)
- Step Right Up (2008)
- under the soles of my shoes (2011)
- Vagabond (2012)
- "Comin Home for Christmas" – single (2013)
- Live with CBC Radio (2014)
- North Star Falling (2015)
- Dirt Road Confessional (2017)
- Just Before Sunrise (2021)
- Great Big Sky (2024)
