= Jumbo: The Plane that Changed the World =

- Also known as: 747: The Jumbo Revolution
- Genre: Factual
- Written by: Christopher Spencer
- Directed by: Christopher Spencer
- Narrated by: Philip Glenister
- Composer: Ned Bouhalassa
- Country of origin: United Kingdom
- Original language: English

Production
- Executive producers: Tom Brisley; Alan Handel
- Producer: Victoria Musguin
- Cinematography: Rob Goldie
- Running time: 60 minutes
- Production companies: Arrow Media; Handel Productions

Original release
- Network: BBC Two; BBC Two HD
- Release: 27 February 2014

Jumbo: The Plane that Changed the World, also known as 747: The Jumbo Revolution, is a British documentary that was broadcast on BBC Two on 27 February 2014. The documentary, written and directed by Christopher Spencer, is about the development of the Boeing 747 jumbo jet.

== Cast ==
- Jullian Littman as Joe Sutter
- Stuart Saunders as William McPherson Allen
- David Peart as Juan Trippe
- Eric Meyers as Jack Waddell
- Alexandra Metaxa as Emilia de Geer

== Production ==
The documentary was commissioned by the BBC and is a co-production with Smithsonian Channel and Discovery Canada. The Smithsonian Channel will broadcast it as a two-hour episode with the title 747: The Jumbo Revolution. The production company is Arrow Media and the distributor is TCB Media.

== Reception ==
The Guardian called it a television highlight of the day. Overnight figures show that the documentary was watched by 1.34 million viewers in the United Kingdom, with a 5.9% audience share.
