= Clayton Frechette =

Canadian ice hockey player

- Born: April 7, 1892; Belleville, Ontario, Canada
- Died: December 23, 1974 (aged 82)
- Position: Defence
- Shot: Left
- Played for: Montreal Canadiens
- Playing career: 1909–1914

Joseph Clayton Frechette (April 7, 1892 – December 23, 1974) was a Canadian professional ice hockey player. He played with the Montreal Canadiens of the National Hockey Association from in the 1912–13 season and 1913–14 season, appearing in a total of two games.
