= Bring 'Em All In (song) =

Single by Mike Scott

from the album Bring 'Em All In
- B-side: "City Full of Ghosts (Dublin)"
- Released: 4 September 1995
- Length: 3:56
- Label: Chrysalis
- Songwriter: Mike Scott
- Producers: Mike Scott; Niko Bolas

Mike Scott singles chronology
"Bring 'Em All In" (1995)	"Building the City of Light" (1995)

"Bring 'Em All In" is a song from Scottish singer-songwriter Mike Scott, released on 4 September 1995 as the lead single from his first solo album, Bring 'Em All In (1995). It was written by Mike Scott, and produced by Scott and Niko Bolas. The song reached No. 56 on the UK Singles Chart and remained in the top 100 for two weeks.

== Critical reception ==
On its release, Music & Media wrote: "Going for a world record straightaway: ex-Waterboy Scott sings the word "bring" 66 times on this passionate folk song." In a review of Bring 'Em All Inn, The Guardian commented: "Scott's lyrics are too soul-bearing for comfort but he can write a good tune - the title track, in particular, is deserving of a very wide audience." Neil McKay of Sunday Life considered the song to be "haunting", with a "gorgeously simple melody".

Diana Valois of The Morning Call wrote: "The title cut is a terse taunt rumble of guitar with plenty of drama as Scott shepherds the title chant from a whispered plea to a gravelly command. While Scott isn't a "Christian artist," this cut, which winds into a hushed, church-like chorus, has the right sentiment and edge to cross over." Sandra Schulman of the South Florida Sun Sentinel described the song as "sound[ing] like the song of a savior, requesting all the good, evil and in-between to come into his heart for shelter." Kevin O'Hare, writing for the Newhouse News Service, described the song as "kick[ing] the [album] off in hypnotic and promising fashion".

== Formats ==
7" and cassette single
No.	Title	Length
1.	"Bring 'Em All In"	3:56
2.	"City Full of Ghosts (Dublin)"	2:47

CD single (UK #1)
No.	Title	Length
1.	"Bring 'Em All In"	3:56
2.	"City Full of Ghosts (Dublin)"	2:47
3.	"Mother Cluny"	2:33
4.	"Beatles Reunion Blues"	4:45

CD single (US release)
No.	Title	Length
1.	"Bring 'Em All In"	3:56
2.	"Mother Cluny"	2:33
3.	"Beatles Reunion Blues"	4:45
4.	"Two Great Waves"	3:51
5.	"My Beautiful Guide"	2:33

CD single (UK and US promo)
No.	Title	Length
1.	"Bring 'Em All In"	3:56

== Personnel ==
- Mike Scott - vocals, all instruments, producer
- Niko Bolas - producer, recording, engineer, mixing

Other

- Stefano Giovannini - cover photography
- Mike Scott - cover concept
- Stylorouge - design

== Charts ==
Chart (1995)	Peak position
Scotland Singles (Official Charts)	38
UK Singles (Official Charts)	56
