= Deep Wells, Nevada =

- Ghost town
- Location within Nevada Location within the United States
- Country: United States
- State: Nevada
- County: Eureka
- Elevation: 5,666 ft (1,727 m)

Deep Wells is a ghost town in Eureka County, Nevada in the United States.

== History ==
Deep Wells was a stage station between Cherry Creek and Wells, Nevada. Later it was a stop on the Eureka and Palisade Railroad, although the town existed before the arriving of the railroad in 1874. The town was used as a water stop. Currently the only trace of the town is the ruins of a windmill.
