= The Whole of the Moon: The Music of Mike Scott and the Waterboys =

Studio album by The Waterboys
- Released: 6 October 1998
- Length: 74:05
- Label: EMI

The Waterboys chronology
The Live Adventures of the Waterboys (1998)	The Whole of the Moon: The Music of Mike Scott and the Waterboys (1998)	A Rock in the Weary Land (2000)

The Whole of the Moon: The Music of Mike Scott and the Waterboys is a compilation album by The Waterboys and Mike Scott, released in 1998 by EMI.

== Critical reception ==
Professional ratings
Review scores
Source	Rating
AllMusic	4/5 stars
Encyclopedia of Popular Music	5/5 stars

William Ruhlmann of AllMusic described the compilation as an "excellent sampler", adding: "The sequencing pays no attention to chronology, [but] despite this, Scott's impassioned singing holds things together better than might be expected, and the effect is not unlike a good Waterboys concert." The 2000 book The Mojo Collection: The Ultimate Music Companion described the album as a "useful compilation" which "also rounds up some of Scott's stripped-down solo work".

== Track listing ==
No.	Title	Writer(s)	Length
1.	"The Whole of the Moon"	Mike Scott	5:01
2.	"Glastonbury Song"	Scott	3:42
3.	"Medicine Bow"	Scott, Anthony Thistlethwaite	2:44
4.	"Fisherman's Blues"	Scott, Steve Wickham	4:25
5.	"A Girl Called Johnny (Live)"	Scott	4:14
6.	"The Pan Within"	Scott	6:10
7.	"She Is So Beautiful"	Scott	3:56
8.	"Rare, Precious and Gone (Radio Session)"	Scott	4:31
9.	"Strange Boat"	Scott, Thistlethwaite	3:05
10.	"Red Army Blues"	Scott	8:05
11.	"This Is the Sea"	Scott	6:29
12.	"Higher in Time"	Scott, Thistlethwaite	3:07
13.	"The Return of Pan"	Scott	4:19
14.	"What Do You Want Me to Do?"	Scott	3:01
15.	"When Ye Go Away"	Scott	4:37
16.	"Love Anyway"	Scott	6:41
