= Beyond the Blue =

Studio album by The Duhks
- Released: June 2014
- Genre: Folk
- Label: Compass Records

The Duhks chronology
Fast Paced World (2008)	Beyond the Blue (2014)

Beyond the Blue is an album by The Duhks, released June 24, 2014. The album centers on eclectic folk music, including Cajun ("Lazy John"), Klezmer ("You Go East, I'll Go West"), Malian worldbeat ("Je pense à toi"), country ("Suffer No Fools"), gospel ("Just One Step Away"), and protest song elements ("Black Mountain Lullaby").

== Track listing ==
1. "Beyond the Blue"
2. "Banjo Roustabout"
3. "Suffer No Fools"
4. "Burn"
5. "These Dreams"
6. "Black Mountain Lullaby"
7. "Tønderhoning"
8. "Lazy John"
9. "Je pense à toi"
10. "You Go East, I'll Go West"
11. "Just One Step Away"
12. "Je pense à toi (Reprise)"
