= Dan Frechette =

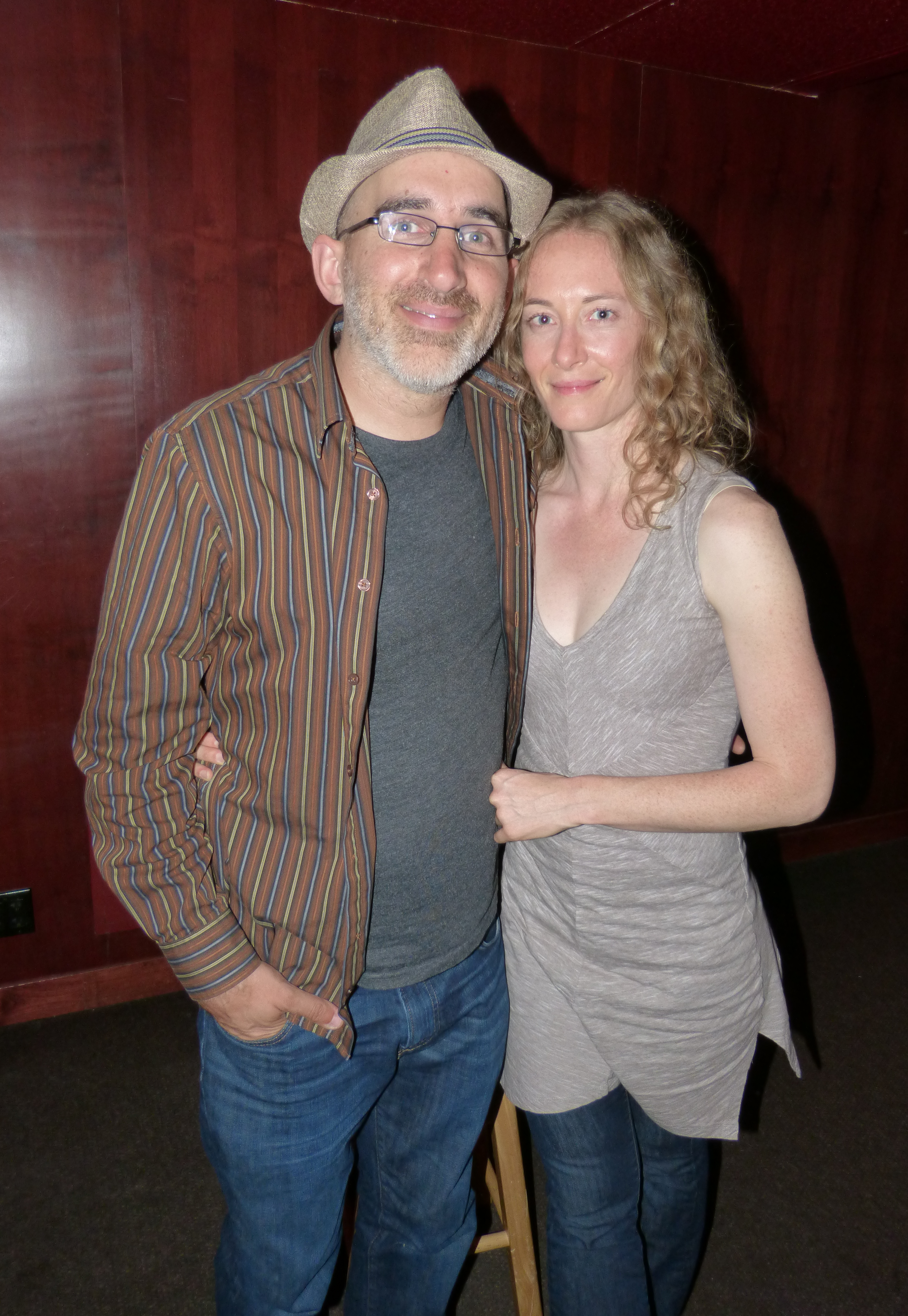
- Dan Frechette with Laurel Thomsen in 2015.

Background information
- Born: September 12, 1976 (age 48); Flin Flon, Manitoba, Canada
- Origin: Canada
- Occupation(s): singer-songwriter, entertainer, multi-instrumentalist

Dan Frechette (born September 12, 1976 in Flin Flon, Manitoba) is a Canadian entertainer, singer-songwriter, and instrumentalist whose compositions have been recorded by The Duhks, Dervish, and The Ploughboys.

== Career ==
Frechette was signed to EMI Music Publishing as a teenager and has since written over 1,500 songs and released over 100 albums of original music. His song "Mists of Down Below" was The Duhks 2004 single for their second studio album "The Duhks" and his song "You Don't See It" was a 2008 single for their fourth album "Fast Paced World". His song "Who Will Take My Place" was included on The Duhks third album "Migrations" and The Ploughboys album "Live at the 'Shed'". Frechette's compositions have been featured in soundtracks for Universal Soldier II: Brothers in Arms and Big Drive.

Frechette has toured North America and Europe, performing at house concerts, venues, and festivals, including the Winnipeg Folk Festival as a solo artist in 1992, 1995, 2004, 2006 and with the band Motel 75 in 2000, the Mariposa Folk Festival in 1995, the Ottawa Folk Festival in 2006, the Suwannee Springfest in 2005, and the Edmonton Folk Festival in 2008. Frechette has released 86 albums, including "Lucky Day" in 2005, produced by Bill Bourne.
