= The Wailin' Jennys =

Canadian folk/bluegrass group

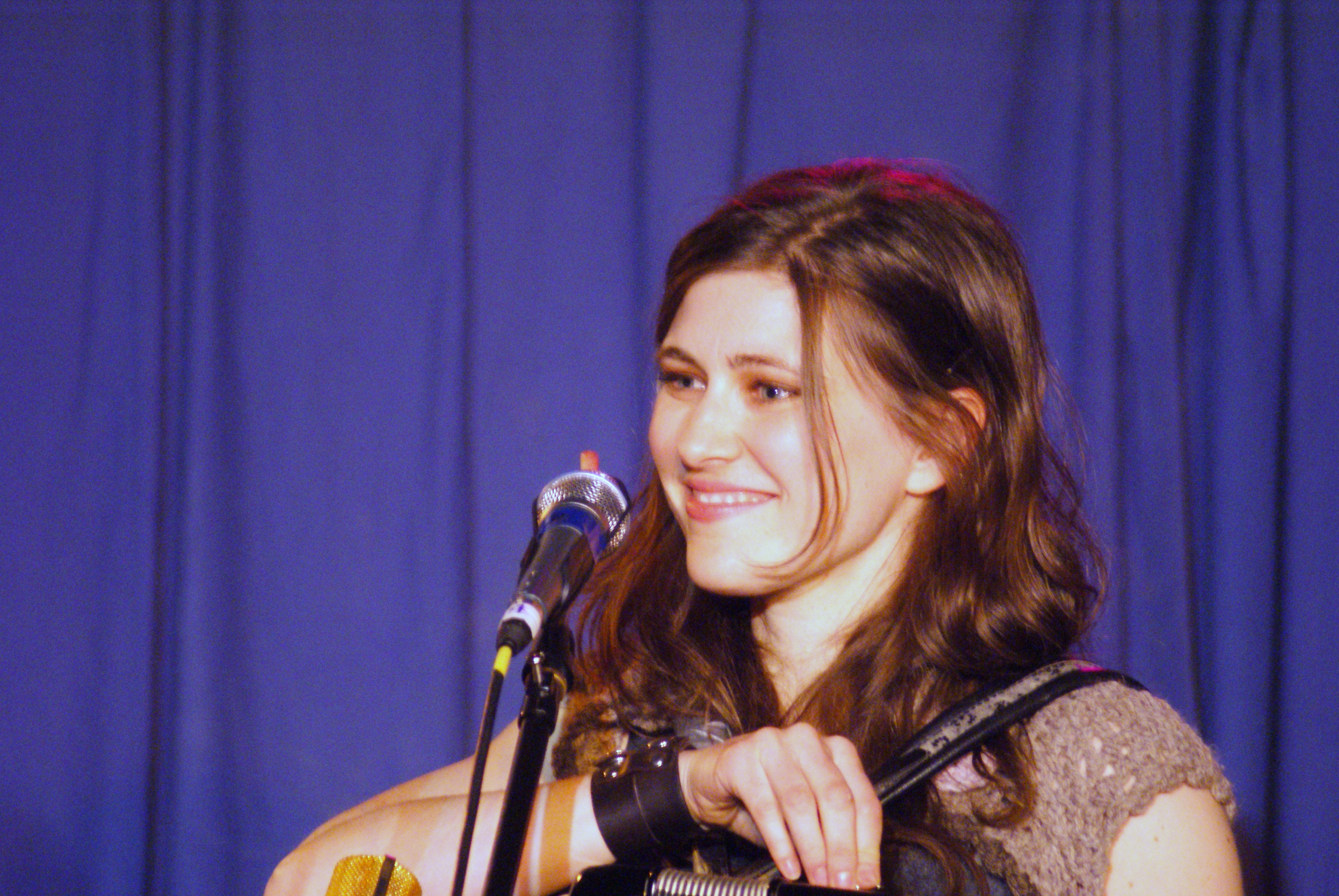
- Ruth Moody performing in Ireby, England 2008

Background information
- Origin: Winnipeg, Manitoba, Canada
- Genres: Folk, bluegrass
- Years active: 2002–present
- Labels: Jericho Beach, Red House
- Members: Ruth Moody; Nicky Mehta; Heather Masse
- Past members: Cara Luft; Annabelle Chvostek
- Website: thewailinjennys.com

The Wailin' Jennys are a Canadian music group. A 2011 review says they "sing like siblings and play like seasoned veterans". They have released several albums and received two Juno Awards. The group has been featured several times on the American Public Media program A Prairie Home Companion.

== History ==
The group was founded in 2002, when a Winnipeg guitar shop called Sled Dog Music brought Ruth Moody, Nicky Mehta and Cara Luft together for a joint performance. The show was well received and the owner, John Sharples, scheduled a follow-up performance and suggested they "go on tour and call themselves the Wailin' Jennys."

The group's name is a pun on the name of country singer Waylon Jennings. Jennings died the same month, causing anger at a music conference where they were playing. "They thought we were making fun of him or something", says Luft. However, the band never expected to last for more than a few shows, seeing they were all part-time musicians.

The band released a self-titled EP and an album, 40 Days, in 2004.

The group now consists of soprano Ruth Moody, mezzo Nicky Mehta and alto Heather Masse. In previous years, the Jennys have also toured with fiddler and mandolinist Jeremy Penner, who is from Ruth's former band, Scruj MacDuhk. Other band members have included Annabelle Chvostek, a singer/songwriter from Montreal, and Ruth Moody's brother Richard on viola and mandolin. Both Penner and Moody have appeared on The Wailin' Jennys' albums. In 2007, Chvostek left the group and was replaced by Heather Masse, a Maine-born singer and member of the band Heather & the Barbarians.

The Wailin' Jennys have won two Juno Awards for Roots and Traditional Album of the Year (Group): in 2005 for 40 Days and in 2012 for Bright Morning Stars. They were also nominated for the same award for Firecracker in 2007.

== Discography ==
=== Albums ===
Title	Album details	Peak chart positions			
Title	Album details	US Grass	US Heat	US Indie	US Folk
40 Days	Release date: August 10, 2004; Label: Red House Records	—	—	—	—
Firecracker	Release date: June 6, 2006; Label: Red House Records	2	23	27	—
Live at the Mauch Chunk Opera House	Release date: August 11, 2009; Label: Red House Records	3	25	—	—
Bright Morning Stars	Release date: February 8, 2011; Label: Red House Records	1	7	24	10
Fifteen	Release date: October 27, 2017; Label: Red House Records	1	1	17	12
"—" denotes releases that did not chart

=== Extended plays ===
Title	Album details	Peak positions
Title	Album details	US Grass
The Wailin' Jennys EP	Release date: 2003; Label: Red House Records	—
iTunes Session	Release date: November 1, 2011; Label: iTunes	7
"—" denotes releases that did not chart
