= Bring 'Em All In =

Studio album by Mike Scott
- Released: 18 September 1995
- Recorded: Findhorn Foundation
- Genre: Folk rock
- Length: 43:16
- Label: Chrysalis
- Producer: Niko Bolas; Mike Scott

Mike Scott chronology
Dream Harder (1993)	Bring 'Em All In (1995)	Still Burning (1997)

Bring 'Em All In is the debut solo studio album by Scottish singer-songwriter Mike Scott, released by Chrysalis on 18 September 1995. The cover and album photography were provided by Niko Bolas, Stefano Giovanni, Jeff Mitchell and Scott. The song "What Do You Want Me to Do?" was later covered by Rod Stewart.

== Critical reception ==
Professional ratings
Review scores
Source	Rating
AllMusic	3/5 stars
The Guardian	3/5 stars
NME	2/10

Upon its release, Music Week stated, "Not blues, not rock, not folk, but an agreeable mix of all three from the former Waterboys frontman. Occasionally beautiful." Neil McKay of Sunday Life described Bring 'Em All In as Scott "back to form with his most consistent, most satisfying album since This Is the Sea" and one which presents him "stripped raw, both musically and lyrically". He noted the "gorgeously simple melodies" of "Wonderful Disguise", "She Is So Beautiful" and the title track, and considered "Long Way to the Light" to "partially explain the spirituality that imbues all 13 tracks". Simon Evans of The Birmingham Post considered it an "intensely personal and courageous collection of songs" presented in a "simple setting". He did not feel that Scott "convey[s] his spiritual awakening as powerfully as Bob Dylan on 'Precious Angel' or even, in a different context, John Lennon's 'God', but considered the album, for "all its faults", including the "occasional lapses into lyrical naivety", to be a "brave and admirable [one] worthy of further investigation".

Lawrence Donegan of The Guardian believed the Waterboys' transition from rock to folk music in 1986 had resulted in "sub-Chieftans offerings", whereas Bring 'Em All In indicates Scott "remains a folk music fan but at least he now appears to be obsessed with pre-electric Bob Dylan – a dated but praiseworthy musical reference point". He added, "Scott's lyrics are too soul-bearing for comfort but he can write a good tune – the album's title track, in particular, is deserving of a very wide audience." Sylvia Patterson of NME summarised the album as "13 acoustic folk ballad strummers with occasional 'lecky geetar, piano doodles and mouth-organ puffin' Bob Dylan road-trip numbers" and one of "soporific glumness, introspection and hysterically romanticised literal 'poems'". She continued, "It's all searingly earnest and 'intimate' and, yes, you may be deeply moved by a rummage in the 'stuff' of Mike Scott, but these are mere dreary postcards from a big girl's blouse who still thinks 'bobbing sailing boats' is a stoatingly original emotional feast in the pop song of the day." Dave Simpson of Melody Maker remarked that the album sees Scott present "the Small Music" in comparison to the Waterboys' early "Big Music" period, with a "mawkishness that conjures up images of Sunday schools and beards". He noted the album "has its moments", but, as Scott "flail[s] hopelessly around for self-revelation, some judgement and direction", is, "for the most part, as confused, navel-gazing and unsure of spirit as anything he's done".

== Track listing ==
All songs by Mike Scott.

1. "Bring 'Em All In" – 3:58
2. "Iona Song" – 2:47
3. "Edinburgh Castle" – 4:37
4. "What Do You Want Me to Do?" – 3:05
5. "I Know She's in the Building" – 3:16
6. "City Full of Ghosts (Dublin)" – 2:47
7. "Wonderful Disguise" – 3:32
8. "Sensitive Children" – 2:40
9. "Learning to Love Him" – 1:39
10. "She Is So Beautiful" – 4:05
11. "Wonderful Disguise (Reprise)" – 0:29
12. "Long Way to the Light" – 6:32
13. "Building the City of Light" – 3:49

== Personnel ==
- Mike Scott
- Roddy Lorimer - Trumpet

== Charts ==
Chart (1995)	Peak position
Norwegian Albums Chart	14
Swedish Albums Chart	21
UK Albums Chart	23
