= Live at the Mauch Chunk Opera House =

Live album by The Wailin' Jennys
- Released: 2009
- Recorded: August 30, 2008
- Genre: Folk
- Label: Red House Records
- Producer: David Travers-Smith

The Wailin' Jennys chronology
Firecracker (2006)	Live at the Mauch Chunk Opera House (2009)	Bright Morning Stars (2011)

Live at the Mauch Chunk Opera House is the third album by the Canadian folk trio The Wailin' Jennys.

== Production ==
In the last week of August 2008, alt-folk group The Wailin' Jennys arrived at the Mauch Chunk Opera House with the goal of laying down a live recording to capture their performances in the famous Mauch Chunk Opera House, in the town of Jim Thorpe, Pennsylvania. "Live at the Mauch Chunk Opera House" was recorded during a single day, rather than being compiled from an entire tour.

The album was the Wailin' Jennys' first live album, and their first album since Heather Masse, the group's third alto, joined founding members soprano Ruth Moody and mezzo Nicky Mehta, and since they added instrumentalist Jeremy Penner as sideman.

The Mauch Chunk album features two originals from each of the three members, including Mehta's "Begin," which features prominently in the soundtrack of the movie "The Cake Eaters." Also included are two previously unrecorded long-time concert staples: Jane Siberry's "Calling All Angels" and Ella Jenkins' "Racing with the Sun." The album also features a cappella rendition of Lead Belly's "Bring Me Li'l Water Silvy," previously recorded by the group on their 2003 debut EP.

== Reception ==
It received positive reviews, with The Wailin' Jennys frequently performing music from it and their other albums on Prairie Home Companion and other such programs.

== Track listing ==
1. "Deeper Well" (David Olney, Daniel Lanois, Emmylou Harris) - 05:19
2. "Summertime" (George Gershwin, Ira Gershwin, DuBose Heyward, Dorothy Heyward) - 02:45
3. "Intro To Driving" - 01:57
4. "Driving" (Heather Masse) - 04:48
5. "Bold Riley" (Traditional, arr. by Heather Masse, Nicky Mehta, Ruth Moody, Jeremy Penner) - 05:09
6. "Intro To Glory Bound" - 00:23
7. "Glory Bound" (Ruth Moody) - 04:22
8. "Arlington" (Nicky Mehta) - 04:50
9. "Bring Me Li’l Water Silvy" (Huddie Ledbetter) - 04:03
10. "One More Dollar" (Gillian Welch, David Rawlings) - 05:18
11. "Racing With The Sun" (Ella Jenkins) - 04:29
12. "Paint A Picture" (Heather Masse) - 01:29
13. "Intro To Begin" - 01:01
14. "Begin" (Nicky Mehta) - 03:41
15. "Motherless Child" (Traditional, arr. by Heather Masse, Nicky Mehta, Ruth Moody, Jeremy Penner) - 04:35
16. "Calling All Angels" (Jane Siberry) - 06:26
17. "Intro To One Voice" - 00:29
18. "One Voice" (Ruth Moody) - 04:19
