= Bija, India =

Bija Beeja
- village
- Location in Punjab, India Bija (India)
- Coordinates: 30.7°N 76.22°E
- Country: India
- State: Punjab
- District: Ludhiana
- Established: 1500's ce
- Founder: Baba Desu

Government
  - Type: Panchayt
  - Body: Gram panchayat

Area
  - Total: 28 km^{2} (11 sq mi)
- Elevation: 254 m (833 ft)
  - Rank: 3167

Languages
  - Official: Punjabi
  - Regional: Puadhi
- Time zone: UTC+5:30 (IST)
- PIN: 141401
- Telephone code: 01628

Bija or Beeja is a village and former princely state in the Punjab Hills, in District Ludhiana in India.

== Village ==
Bija is situated about 30 km from Ludhiana city and 14 km from Khanna. Manji Sahib Gurudawara is to the north-west of the village. Because of the location of the village, it is on the main junction of Amritsar Delhi NH1 and Payal Samrala cross roads.

The first ever milk plant was built here by a Scandinavian in the early 1960s. The village gurudwara was rebuilt by the family who had immigrated to USA in 1910. The village has seen a lot changes in 10 to 15 years. Prominent villagers now reside abroad in countries like Canada, UK and USA.

== History ==
This village was founded by Sardar Nachattar Singh Khattra. He was the wealthiest person of the area and the most prominent businessman of Punjab at that time. Khattra's business expanded from Northern India all the way to Eastern India.

During the British Raj, Sardar Nachattar Singh built a Haveli (palace) in the village of Khattra, which still stands to this day. Often during Sardar Nachattar Singh's visits to Khattra village, he used to meet the local governors of the area. Khattra is situated near Gurdwara Karamsar Rara Sahib or Gurdwara Rara Sahib. This village was transformed from simple Rara to Rara Sahib due to the visit by the sixth Sikh Guru, Guru Hargobind Ji. Nachattar's business interests varied from a brewery to Brick Mines, Land and Transportation. Even to this date Khattra Buses are seen on the roads of Punjab and still has 60% of transportation hold in the state of Punjab.

During the Raj era, Bija was the capital of Bija State, one of several princely states of the Punjab Hills, in the charge of the Punjab States Agency.

== Ruling Thakurs ==
Its native rulers were styled Thakur. After the 1803 - 1815 occupation by the Ghurka Kingdom of Nepal, which constituted an interregnum, they were :

- 1815 - 1817 Man Chand (died 1817)
- 1817 - 1841 Pratap Chand (d. 1841)
- 1841 - 1905 Udai Chand (born 1829 - d. 1905)
- 1905 - 15 August 1947 Puran Chand

== See also ==
- Ludhiana district

== Sources and external links ==
- Official Website of District Ludhiana in Punjab (India)
