= Annabelle Chvostek =

Canadian musician

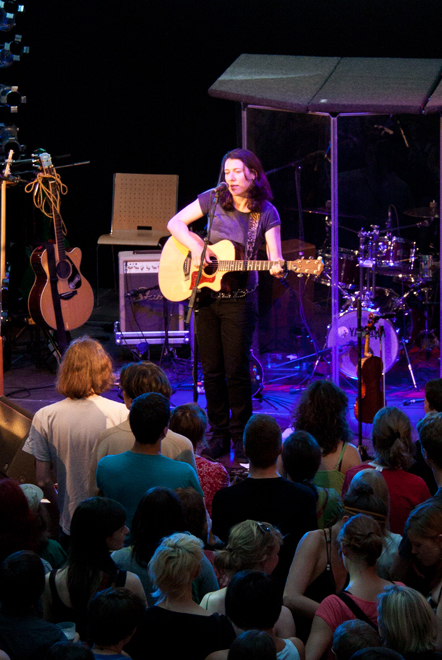

Background information
- Born: October 5, 1973 (age 52); Toronto, Ontario
- Origin: Toronto
- Genres: Indie folk, folk rock, folk, roots rock, Americana
- Occupations: Singer-songwriter, multi-instrumentalist, composer, producer
- Instruments: Voice, guitar, mandolin, violin, percussion
- Years active: 1997–present
- Label: MQGV
- Formerly of: The Wailin' Jennys
- Website: http://annabellemusic.com/

Annabelle Chvostek (born October 5, 1973) is a Canadian singer-songwriter based in Toronto, Ontario.

== Life and career ==
Born in Toronto, she is the daughter of Canadian television producer Milan Chvostek (The Nature of Things) and journalist Isobel Warren. Her first gig was with the Canadian Opera Company when she was seven. She got her start in music singing with the Canadian Children's Opera Chorus and performing on television specials with Anne Murray and Tommy Hunter. She played violin with her dad and joined in on her mother's repertoire of Canadian folk songs. At age 14 she started dabbling in audio production and multitrack composition with a four-track tape recorder and a house full of musical instruments and objects to make noise with. At 16 she began writing and performing songs accompanied by guitar. She moved to Montréal in 1995 to study Interdisciplinary Fine Arts at Concordia University, and in 1997 released her first recording, 1am to 5am. She launched her singer-songwriter career there with opening sets for Dar Williams, Penny Lang, Veda Hille, Kinnie Starr and Tegan and Sara, and started touring Canada sharing the stage with Rae Spoon, Po' Girl, Bob Snider and many more. After joining The Wailin' Jennys in November 2004, she toured throughout North America, the UK, and Australia, including the 2006 Edmonton Folk Music Festival, featuring a surprise mainstage set with Bruce Cockburn. There were multiple appearances on A Prairie Home Companion, including a PBS broadcast on Great Performances, live at Tanglewood alongside Garrison Keillor and Meryl Streep, and a collaboration with Keillor and Bonnie Raitt.

Chvostek has undertaken numerous collaborative projects in music, dance, and new media. She has created songs in collaboration with the bands Millipede and Lake of Stew and with electroacoustic composer Ned Bouhalassa. Her multi-disciplinary performance in 2004 with Anna Friz, The Automated Prayer Machine, toured Europe and Canada. She has produced soundscores for choreographers in Montréal and New York, including five works for choreographer Aviva Geismar/Drastic Action.

Her self-produced first full-length CD Full Stop in 2000 was included as a number 7 spot on the national campus radio charts. That year, she also collaborated with Ned Bouhalassa to produce Bija, an experimental electro-acoustic project. She was a finalist of the CBC big break awards and released Water in 2003 with support from the Canada Council. In 2005 she created a stripped-down solo EP called Burned My Ass, hit No. 1 in the roots category on the national campus radio charts, and helped land her a job with folk/roots harmony trio the Wailin' Jennys, with whom she sang alto and played guitar, mandolin, and violin. The songs she contributed to the band's repertoire include "The Devil's Paintbrush Road", "Swallow", "Apocalypse Lullaby", and "Firecracker", all of which appear on the Wailin' Jennys' June 2006 release, Firecracker, produced by David Travers-Smith. She left the Jennys in 2007 to return to composition and solo performance.

In 2008 Annabelle Chvostek released "Resilience" produced by Roma Baran (Laurie Anderson) and Vivian Stoll (Isis). It was nominated for a Canadian Folk Music Award in the Contemporary Album of the Year category and includes a co-write with Bruce Cockburn. Annabelle's 2012 album Rise was produced by Don Kerr and was nominated for a JUNO Award and a Canadian Folk Music Award. In 2015 she released Be The Media, produced by Jeff Oehler of Beehive Production.

Her latest release String of Pearls was co-produced by David Travers-Smith, Fernando Rosa, and Annabelle Chvostek. It was recorded in Canada and Uruguay and features tango, classical, and jazz musicians from both countries.

== Discography ==
- 1am to 5am (cassette tape; 1997)
- Bija (2000)
- Full Stop (2000)
- Water (2003)
- Burned My Ass (2004)
- What is Indie? (2006)
- Firecracker (The Wailin' Jennys) (2006)
- Resilience (2008)
- Live From Folk Alley (2011)
- Rise (2012)
- Be the Media (2015)
- String of Pearls (2021)
- Primavera III: the vessel (2022)
