= Bright Morning Stars =

Studio album by The Wailin' Jennys
- Released: February 8, 2011
- Recorded: Haliburton, Ontario Fall 2009
- Genres: Folk rock Folk
- Label: Red House
- Producer: David Travers-Smith

The Wailin' Jennys chronology
Live at the Mauch Chunk Opera House (2009)	Bright Morning Stars (2011)	iTunes Session (2011)

Professional ratings
Review scores
Source	Rating
AllMusic	4/5 stars
PopMatters	7/10 stars

Bright Morning Stars is the fourth full-length album from Canadian folk trio The Wailin' Jennys.

The eponymous title track is a traditional Appalachian spiritual.

In astronomy, the term, "morning star" often refers to the planet Venus. This term also has symbolic meanings and associations in various religious contexts.

== Track listings ==
No.	Title	Writer(s)	Length
1.	"Swing Low Sail High"	Nicky Mehta	4:01
2.	"All the Stars"	Ruth Moody	4:08
3.	"Bird Song"	Heather Masse	3:33
4.	"Away But Never Gone"	Nicky Mehta	3:02
5.	"Storm Comin'"	Ruth Moody	4:46
6.	"Mona Louise"	Heather Masse	3:54
7.	"Bright Morning Stars"	Traditional	3:19
8.	"Across the Sea"	Heather Masse	3:02
9.	"Asleep at Last"	Ruth Moody	2:55
10.	"What Has Been Done"	Nicky Mehta	4:10
11.	"Cherry Blossom Love"	Heather Masse	4:32
12.	"You Are Here"	Ruth Moody	4:04
13.	"Last Goodbye"	Nicky Mehta	3:27
Total length:			48:53
