= Cara Luft =

Canadian musician

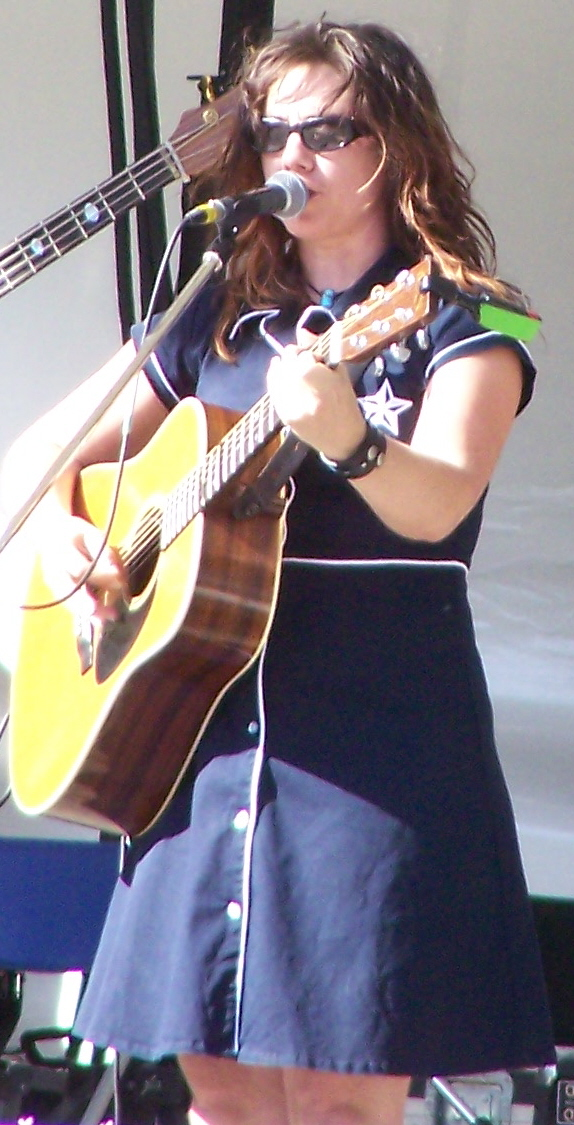
- Cara Luft in Calgary (2007)

Background information
- Born: Calgary, Alberta, Canada
- Genres: Folk, rock, Americana
- Occupation(s): Musician, songwriter
- Instrument(s): Vocals, guitar, piano, banjo
- Years active: 1997–present
- Formerly of: The Wailin' Jennys
- Website: caraluft.com

Cara Luft is a Canadian singer-songwriter, guitarist and clawhammer banjo player, and founding member of the Canadian folk trio The Wailin' Jennys. She returned to her solo career in 2005.

== Early life and education ==
Luft was born 27 May 1974 and raised in Calgary, Alberta to folk-singing parents. She was brought up in the city's vibrant folk music community. She began playing dulcimer and autoharp at the age of four, and started singing with the family band. Her guitar self-studies began at age 11.

== Career ==
After spending four years living in British Columbia, she moved to Winnipeg, Manitoba in the fall of 1999 to further pursue her music career. She developed an understanding of alternate tunings and both finger and flat-picking techniques, becoming an accomplished acoustic guitar player. She performs as a claw hammer banjo player, and sings with an alto voice. Her writing and playing styles are influenced by rock groups such as Led Zeppelin, as well as both modern and traditional folk music (British, Canadian and American styles). She has worked as a workshop leader and instructor at international music camps, including the Puget Sound Guitar Workshop, Foothills Acoustic Music Institute, Colorado Roots Music Camp, and Goderich Celtic College.

In 2000 Luft released her debut album, Tempting the Storm.

Luft co-founded and performed with the Wailin' Jennys in the early 2000s, which released a self-titled EP and an album, 40 Days, in 2004. Luft left the band soon after and set out once more on a solo career. She released the album The Light Fantastic in 2007, which was produced by Neil Osborne of the Canadian rock band 54-40, and mixed by Warne Livesey.

Luft toured Europe with Liverpool-based side musician Scott Poley, a music producer who plays guitar, pedal and lap steel. In Canada she toured with bass player Gilles Fournier, sometimes with guest musicians Donovan Giesbrecht and Chris Neufeld of The Other Brothers. Her co-writing partner for the album Darlingford was Lewis Melville, of Guleph, Ontario.

Luft performed in Scotland in 2008 with Hugh MacMillan, and returned to tour with him again in 2009. In 2012 she released another album, Darlingford on the Blue Case label.

In 2016, Luft joined with JD Edwards to form the duo The Small Glories. They released their debut album Wonderous Traveller in February 2016.

== Discography ==
=== Cara Luft ===
- Cara Luft (EP) (cassette only)
- Tragedy of the Commons (EP)
- Tempting the Storm (2000)
- The Light Fantastic (2007)
- One Take Only (EP)
- Black Water Side (2011)
- Darlingford (2012)

=== The Wailin' Jennys ===
- The Wailin' Jennys EP
- 40 Days (2004)

=== The Small Glories ===
- Wonderous Traveller (2016)
- Assiniboine & The Red (2019)

== Other sources ==
- Jason Schneider (11 October 2007). "The life fantastic; CARA LUFT MAKES MOST OF CAREER, POST-WAILIN' JENNYS". The Record – Kitchener, Ontario. Archived from the original on 31 January 2013.
