= The Duhks =

Canadian folk band

- The Duhks performing at the Shakori Hills Grassroots Festival in 2008

Background information
- Origin: Winnipeg, Manitoba, Canada
- Genres: American folk, blues, Irish folk, folk rock, gospel, Latin percussion, soul, zydeco
- Years active: 2002–present
- Label: Sugar Hill (former)
- Members: Leonard Podolak; Jessee Havey; Jordan McConnell; Scott Senior; Tania Elizabeth
- Past members: Sarah Dugas; Christian Dugas; Kevin Joaquin Garcia; Colin Savoie-Levac; Anna Lindblad
- Website: duhks.com

The Duhks were a Canadian folk fusion band, formed in 2002 in Winnipeg, Manitoba, Canada. Featuring banjo, fiddle, guitar, percussion, and vocals, The Duhks blended folk music together with various Canadian and American traditional styles, including soul, gospel, old-time country string, and zydeco. The band also commonly played traditional Irish dance music, integrating Latin-influenced percussion as well as often Celtic- and Cajun-influenced fiddle-playing.

== History ==
In 2002, Appalachian-influenced clawhammer banjo player Leonard Podolak founded The Duhks in Winnipeg with gospel- and soul-influenced singer Jessee Havey, fiddle player Tania Elizabeth, and Celtic-influenced guitarist Jordan McConnell—all Canadian musicians. The name "Duhks" comes from Scruj MacDuhk, Podolak's defunct previous band.

The Duhks' first album, Your Daughters & Your Sons (2003), was nominated for a Juno award, leading to a contract with Sugar Hill Records. A new percussionist, Latin-influenced Scott Senior, joined the band, who then released their eponymous second album (2005), produced by Béla Fleck, which won a Juno for Best Roots & Traditional Album by a Group. "Heaven's My Home," from their third album, Migrations (2006)—produced by Tim O'Brien—was nominated for the 2007 Grammy award for Best Country Performance By A Duo Or Group With Vocal.

In March 2007, Jessee Havey left the band to pursue other interests and was replaced as the lead singer by Québécois vocalist Sarah Dugas. The group was joined in November 2007 by Sarah's brother, Christian Dugas, as a replacement for percussionist Scott Senior, who left to spend more time with his family. In October 2007, The Duhks Sustainability Project was launched to raise awareness about ways to live a more economically viable and ecologically sustainable lifestyle. The following year, the website FestivaLink released The Duhks' first live album as well as the first to feature Sarah Dugas as lead vocalist and Christian Dugas as percussionist; the album is a compilation of old and new songs, largely recorded at a post-Earth Day benefit in Nederland, Colorado, in April 2008.

Fast Paced World (2008), produced by Jay Joyce, was the first and only official studio album to feature the Dugas siblings. It also received a Juno nomination for Best Roots & Traditional Album. In 2009, FestivaLink released The Duhks' second live album, featuring several guest musicians and recorded primarily at that year's MerleFest in North Carolina.

On January 15, 2010, fiddler Tania Elizabeth announced that she would be moving on. She was temporarily replaced by fiddler Casey Driessen. As of 2010, the whole band was on semi-hiatus, playing far fewer shows. In April 2011, the band announced on their website that this pace would continue, including some shows with former members Havey and Senior, as the Dugas siblings had begun recording and performing as an independent duo.

In January 2012, the band announced a reformation of the band featuring original lead vocalist Jessee Havey, fiddler Tania Elizabeth, Jordan McConnell on guitar, Scott Senior on percussion, and Leonard Podolak on banjo. This lineup did some reunion tours before McConnell, Senior, and Elizabeth left and Havey and Podolak went on to scout a new lineup. The band then did tours with a lineup consisting of new American members, including Rosie Newton (temporary fiddler, who toured with the band for a six-month period ending in the winter of 2014), temporary guitarist Jefferson Hamer, and permanent new percussionist Kevin Garcia. The band entered the studio in December 2013 after successfully using crowdsource funding site Indiegogo to raise money for the recording of a new album, originally planned for release in spring of 2014.

In June 2014, The Duhks officially released their new album, Beyond the Blue. The touring lineup for that album cycle also included Québécois multi-instrumentalist Colin Savoie-Levac on guitar and Swedish fiddler Anna Lindblad on violin as of January 2015.

In the spring of 2016, the band announced on their Facebook page that they would no longer be touring, but proceeded to play a handful of shows in and around Winnipeg over the next few years featuring a lineup of original members Leonard Podolak, Jessee Havey, Jordan McConnell, and Scott Senior plus fiddler Jeremy Penner.

On May 14, 2022, the original lineup of The Duhks played a 20th anniversary reunion show at The West End Cultural Centre in Winnipeg.

== Members ==
=== Current ===
- Leonard Podolak – banjo and vocals (2002–2016, 2022)
- Jessee Havey – lead vocals (2002–2007; 2011–2016, 2022)
- Tania Elizabeth – fiddle and vocals (2002-2010, 2012–2014, 2022)
- Jordan McConnell – guitar (2002–2013, 2022)
- Scott Senior – percussion (2004–2007, 2011–2013, 2022)

=== Former ===
- Sarah Dugas – lead vocals (2007–2011)
- Christian Dugas – drum kit and percussion (2007–2011)
- Colin Savoie-Levac – guitar and bouzouki (2014–2016)
- Kevin Garcia – percussion (2013–2016)
- Anna Lindblad – fiddle/violin (2015–2016)

== Discography ==
=== Studio albums ===
Year	Album details	Peak chart positions	
Year	Album details	US Heat	US Indie
2003	Your Daughters & Your Sons: Release date: June 10, 2003; Label: self-released	—	—
2005	The Duhks: Release date: February 8, 2005; Label: Sugar Hill Records	30	40
2006	Migrations: Release date: September 12, 2006; Label: Sugar Hill Records	—	—
2008	Fast Paced World: Release date: August 19, 2008; Label: Sugar Hill Records	36	—
2014	Beyond the Blue: Release date: June 24, 2014; Label: Compass Records	—	—
"—" denotes releases that did not chart

=== Live albums ===
Year	Album details
2008	FestivaLink presents The Duhks at the Backdoor Theater, Nederland, CO 4/29/08: Live at the Backdoor Theater, Nederland, CO, April 29, 2008; Release date: 2008; Label: FestivaLink.net (also released as The Duhks At A Night Out With Friends: 4/29/2008 Backdoor Theater)
2009	FestivaLink presents The Duhks at MerleFest, NC 4/24/09: Live at Hillside Stage, Merlefest, NC, April 24, 2009; Release date: 2009; Label: FestivaLink.net

== See also ==
- List of bands from Canada
- Scruj MacDuhk
