= China Crisis discography =

- Studio albums: 7
- Live albums: 4
- Compilation albums: 13
- Singles: 22
- Video albums: 3

This is the discography of the English new wave and synth-pop band China Crisis.

== Albums ==
=== Studio albums ===
| Title | Album details | Peak chart positions | | | | | | | | Album |
| Title | Album details | UK | AUS | CAN | GER | NL | NZ | SWE | US | Album |
|---|---|---|---|---|---|---|---|---|---|---|
| Difficult Shapes & Passive Rhythms, Some People Think It's Fun to Entertain | Released: 12 November 1982; Label: Virgin; Formats: LP, MC | 21 | — | — | — | — | 18 | 42 | — | UK: Silver |
| Working with Fire and Steel – Possible Pop Songs Volume Two | Released: 31 October 1983; Label: Virgin; Formats: LP, MC | 20 | 37 | 36 | 36 | 7 | 14 | 32 | 202 | UK: Gold |
| Flaunt the Imperfection | Released: 29 April 1985; Label: Virgin; Formats: CD, LP, MC | 9 | 38 | 21 | — | 14 | 6 | 18 | 171 | UK: Gold; NZ: Platinum |
| What Price Paradise | Released: 24 November 1986; Label: Virgin; Formats: CD, LP, MC | 63 | 73 | 86 | — | — | 17 | — | 114 | |
| Diary of a Hollow Horse | Released: 2 May 1989; Label: Virgin; Formats: CD, LP, MC | 58 | 109 | — | — | — | — | — | — | |
| Warped by Success | Released: 24 August 1994; Label: Stardumb; Formats: CD, LP, MC | — | — | — | — | — | — | — | — | |
| Autumn in the Neighbourhood | Released: 3 June 2015; Label: Self-released; Formats: CD, digital download | — | — | — | — | — | — | — | — | |
"—" denotes releases that did not chart or were not released in that territory.

=== Live albums ===
| Title | Album details |
|---|---|
| Acoustically Yours | Released: October 1995; Label: Telegraph; Formats: CD, MC |
| Scrap Book Vol 1 – Live at the Dominion Theatre | Released: 15 July 2002; Label: Crisis; Formats: CD |
| Singing the Praises of Finer Things | Released: May 2007; Label: Secret/Dream Catcher; Formats: CD |
| Scrapbook Vol. 2 – Live at the Pavillion Theatre | Released: 2017; Label: Self-released; Formats: CD |

=== Compilation albums ===
| Title | Album details | Peak chart positions | |
| Title | Album details | UK | AUS |
|---|---|---|---|
| Collection: The Very Best of China Crisis | Released: 3 September 1990; Label: EMI; Formats: CD, 2xCD, LP, MC | 32 | 106 |
| Diary: A Collection | Released: 21 September 1992; Label: Virgin; Formats: CD, MC | — | — |
| Wishful Thinking | Released: May 1997; Label: Recall 2cd; Formats: 2xCD; Repackaging of Acoustically Yours and Warped by Success | — | — |
| The Best of China Crisis | Released: September 1998; Label: Purple Pyramid; Formats: CD; US-only release | — | — |
| The Best Songs of China Crisis | Released: 1999; Label: Eagle; Formats: CD; Australasia and Brazil-only release | — | — |
| The Definitive Collection | Released: October 2006; Label: The Store for Music; Formats: CD+DVD | — | — |
| Fine and Also Rare China | Released: 2008; Label: Self-released; Formats: CD | — | — |
| Ultimate Crisis | Released: 12 March 2012; Label: Music Club Deluxe/EMI; Formats: 2xCD | — | — |
| Greatest Hits | Released: 5 November 2012; Label: Secret; Formats: CD+DVD, digital download; Collection of live recordings | — | — |
| China Greatness Live | Released: 2014; Label: Self-released; Formats: CD; Limited release; collection of live recordings | — | — |
| Wishful Thinking: The Very Best of China Crisis | Released: 16 June 2014; Label: Spectrum Music/Universal; Formats: CD | — | — |
| Singles / B-Sides / Versions | Released: 15 July 2022; Label: Universal; Formats: digital download | — | — |
| Demos | Released: 15 July 2022; Label: Universal; Formats: digital download | — | — |
"—" denotes releases that did not chart or were not released in that territory.

=== Video albums ===
| Title | Album details |
|---|---|
| Showbiz Absurd | Released: May 1985; Label: Virgin Video; Formats: VHS, LD |
| Acoustically Yours | Released: 1996; Label: Telegraph; Formats: VHS |
| Live in Concert at the Paul McCartney Auditorium Liverpool Institute of Performing Arts | Released: October 2007; Label: Secret Films; Formats: DVD |

== Singles ==
| Title | Year | Peak chart positions | | | | | | | | | | Album |
| Title | Year | UK | AUS | BEL (FL) | CAN | GER | IRE | NL | NZ | US AC | US Dance | Album |
|---|---|---|---|---|---|---|---|---|---|---|---|---|
| "African and White" | 1981 | — | — | — | — | — | — | — | — | — | — | Non-album single |
| "Scream Down at Me" | 1982 | — | — | — | — | — | — | — | — | — | — | Non-album single |
| "African and White" (remix) | 1982 | 45 | 75 | — | — | — | — | — | — | — | — | Difficult Shapes & Passive Rhythms, Some People Think It's Fun to Entertain |
| "No More Blue Horizons (Fool Fool Fool)" | 1982 | — | — | — | — | — | — | — | — | — | — | Difficult Shapes & Passive Rhythms, Some People Think It's Fun to Entertain |
| "Christian" | 1983 | 12 | — | — | — | — | 7 | — | — | — | — | Difficult Shapes & Passive Rhythms, Some People Think It's Fun to Entertain |
| "Tragedy and Mystery" | 1983 | 46 | — | — | — | — | — | — | — | — | — | Working with Fire and Steel – Possible Pop Songs Volume Two |
| "Working with Fire and Steel" | 1983 | 48 | 47 | — | — | — | 29 | — | — | — | 27 | Working with Fire and Steel – Possible Pop Songs Volume Two |
| "Wishful Thinking" | 1984 | 9 | 57 | 10 | — | 16 | 6 | 16 | — | — | — | Working with Fire and Steel – Possible Pop Songs Volume Two |
| "Hanna Hanna" | 1984 | 44 | — | — | — | — | — | — | — | — | — | Working with Fire and Steel – Possible Pop Songs Volume Two |
| "Black Man Ray" | 1985 | 14 | 30 | — | 54 | — | 13 | 36 | 15 | — | — | Flaunt the Imperfection |
| "King in a Catholic Style (Wake Up)" | 1985 | 19 | — | — | — | — | 16 | — | — | — | — | Flaunt the Imperfection |
| "You Did Cut Me" | 1985 | 54 | — | — | — | — | 26 | — | — | — | — | Flaunt the Imperfection |
| "The Highest High" | 1985 | 82 | — | — | — | — | — | — | — | — | — | Flaunt the Imperfection |
| "Arizona Sky" | 1986 | 47 | 52 | — | — | — | — | — | — | 37 | — | What Price Paradise |
| "Best Kept Secret" | 1987 | 36 | — | — | — | — | 20 | — | — | — | — | What Price Paradise |
| "Saint Saviour Square" | 1989 | 81 | — | — | — | — | — | — | — | — | — | Diary of a Hollow Horse |
| "Red Letter Day" | 1989 | 84 | — | — | — | — | — | — | — | — | — | Diary of a Hollow Horse |
| "African and White" (The Steve Proctor remix) | 1990 | — | — | — | — | — | — | — | — | — | — | Collection: The Very Best of China Crisis |
| "Everyday the Same" | 1994 | 90 | — | — | — | — | — | — | — | — | — | Warped by Success |
| "Black Man Ray" (live) | 1996 | — | — | — | — | — | — | — | — | — | — | Acoustically Yours |
| "Everyone You Know" | 2013 | — | — | — | — | — | — | — | — | — | — | Non-album single |
| "It's Too Late" | 2015 | — | — | — | — | — | — | — | — | — | — | 80's Re:Covered – Your Songs with the 80's Sound |
"—" denotes releases that did not chart or were not released in that territory.
