= Freeze Frame (band) =

English new wave band

- Origin: Liverpool, England
- Genres: New wave, synth-pop
- Years active: 1981–1985
- Labels: Crackin' Up, Inevitable Records, RCA Records
- Past members: Steve Byrne; Ronnie Stone; Clive Gee
- Website: Official website

Freeze Frame were an English new wave and synth-pop band formed in Liverpool in 1981. The band consisted of lead vocalist Steve Byrne, guitarist and producer Ronnie Stone, and later keyboardist Clive Gee. They released six commercial singles between 1981 and 1985 through local independent labels including Crackin' Up and Inevitable Records, as well as major distributor RCA Records.

== History ==
Singer Steve Byrne and guitarist/producer Ronnie Stone first met around 1980–1981. Byrne was originally the frontman for local punk/new wave group The Posers, while Stone had been a member of Next, The Blank Tapes, and Afraid of Mice alongside Philip Franz Jones. Stone was initially hired to produce a recording session for The Posers, which led to a songwriting partnership with Byrne. The duo made their early material in a basement rehearsal room in Oxton, Birkenhead, using a Fostex 4-track cassette recorder alongside Teac and Revox tape machines.

Prior to adopting the name Freeze Frame, the duo performed live under the name In a Glass Darkly, playing early shows at The Waverley venue in Ellesmere Port supported by an early line-up of China Crisis. The band subsequently renamed themselves Freeze Frame after the 1979 album Freeze Frame by Godley & Creme. During this early period, Byrne and Stone also toured as members of the synth-pop group Godot alongside former Orchestral Manoeuvres in the Dark musicians Dave Hughes and Martin Cooper, supporting Dalek I Love You.

Freeze Frame developed primarily as a studio-based project, recording extensively at Amazon Studios in Kirkby managed by Jeremy J. Lewis, the co-founder of Eric's Club and owner of Inevitable Records. Producer and sound engineer Gil Norton collaborated with the band on their studio recordings, and poet and actor Craig Charles was among their early creative circle on Liverpool's Temple Street scene. Freeze Frame's debut single, "Touch", was released on Dave Owens' Liverpool-based label Crackin' Up (dated to 1981 in discographies, and recalled by Byrne as March 1982 alongside the Cracking Up at the Pyramid cassette compilation). The band later signed a publishing deal with Hit and Run / April Music and joined Inevitable Records, which secured distribution through RCA Records.

In early 1983, Freeze Frame released their first Inevitable single, "Your Voice" / "Conversation Piece". Critics later compared "Your Voice" to early 1980s pop acts such as Haircut 100, while noting that the B-side "Conversation Piece" featured the first female backing vocal on an Inevitable Records release, with backing vocals contributed by Inevitable labelmate Margox (Margi Clarke), Elizabeth Whalen, and Karen Woodward. The group recorded two sessions for BBC Radio 1. The first, for John Peel, was recorded on 26 March 1983 and broadcast on 31 March 1983, featuring "Foxhole", "Personal Touch", "Your Voice", and "Today Tomorrow". A second BBC Radio 1 session was recorded on 22 March 1984 for DJ Kid Jensen.

Keyboardist Clive Gee, formerly of Afraid of Mice, joined Freeze Frame prior to the release of "Foxhole" in 1984. Produced by Dave Bascombe, "Foxhole" featured artwork by Steve "Jacuzzi" Hardstaffe and photography by Tom Wood; it became the group's highest-charting single, peaking at No. 105 on the UK Singles Chart. That same year, the band released the single and 12-inch maxi-single "Seeking Professional Advice" (co-produced by Stone and Gil Norton, recorded at Amazon Studios and mixed at Livingstone Studios in London), and contributed the track "Culture Won't Wait" to the Inevitable label sampler Small Hits and Near Misses alongside labelmates including Box of Toys, Margox, Dead or Alive, China Crisis, and Wah!. During studio sessions, Stone introduced Turkish saz instrumentation on tracks such as "Where's The Girl", while Lizzie Johnson of The Passage contributed guest vocals.

In 1985, the group released "Today/Tomorrow", produced by Jerry Lewis and featuring guest vocals by Linda Wright on the 12-inch B-side "It Makes Me Cry", followed by a re-recorded synth-pop arrangement of their debut single titled "Touch (Re-Touch)". After RCA declined to fund a full-length studio album, Freeze Frame disbanded in late 1985. Byrne and Stone subsequently formed Push Button Pony with Andy Redhead (formerly of Box of Toys and 3D) and Jon Corner (of 3D), recording demos for the French label Carrere before ending the project.

In February 2018, "Touch" appeared on Cherry Red Records' 5-CD Liverpool retrospective Revolutionary Spirit: The Sound Of Liverpool 1976–1988. In 2019, Cherry Red released the 3-CD box set Birth Of A Nation: Inevitable Records An Independent Liverpool 1979–1986, which anthologised fourteen tracks by Freeze Frame—ten single and B-side tracks alongside the four 1983 Peel Session recordings (though Byrne noted that the set mistakenly included the Crackin' Up version of "Touch" rather than the Inevitable re-recording). Later that year, "Your Voice" was also included on Cherry Red's 4-CD compilation Electrical Language: Independent British Synth Pop 78–84.

== Discography ==
=== EPs and 12" Maxis ===
Year	Release Details	Tracklist	Personnel & Label Credits
1984	In The Foxhole E.P.: Released: 1984; Format: 12" Vinyl EP (Limited Edition); Label: Inevitable Records (Cat. INEV T 14)	Side A: 1. "In The Foxhole" (Remix); 2. "More Voice (Fun Fun Fun)"; Side B: 1. "Foxhole"; 2. "Furnished Heart"; 3. "At Your Scenario"	Steve Byrne – lead vocals; Ronnie Stone – guitar, synthesizers, saz; Clive Gee – keyboards; Track A1, B1 produced by Dave Bascombe; Track A2 mixed by Ronnie Stone & Steve Byrne; Vocals on B2, B3 by Liz Johnson; Cover artwork: Steve Hardstaffe; Photography: Tom Wood
1984	Seeking Professional Advice (Maxi-Single): Released: 1984; Format: 12" Vinyl Maxi-Single; Label: Inevitable Records (Cat. INEV T17)	Side 1: 1. "Seeking Professional Advice (Extended 7" Mix)"; 2. "Brother, Brother (Culture 3)"; Side 2: 1. "Seeking Professional Advice (Fear Mix)"; 2. "My 10,000 Mile Home (Culture 2)"	Steve Byrne – vocals; Ronnie Stone – guitars, vocals, keyboards, programming; Clive Gee – keyboards; Producers: Ronnie Stone and Gil Norton; Sound Engineer: Gil Norton; Assistant Engineer: Felix Kendal; Recorded at Amazon Studios (Liverpool), mixed at Livingstone Studios (London); Additional personnel: Tegs Sweeney (bass on "Seeking"), Mike Timoney (mouth organ & effects), Dave Hassel (African percussion on "Brother"), Tess (backing vocals on "Seeking").

=== Commercial 7" Singles ===
Year	Release Details	Tracklist	Personnel & Label Credits
1981	Touch: Format: 7" Vinyl; Label: Crackin' Up (Cat. CRAK 2)	1. "Touch"; 2. "Life Is Just A Game"	Steve Byrne, Ronnie Stone – songwriting
1983	Your Voice: Format: 7" Vinyl; Label: Inevitable Records (Cat. INEV 12)	1. "Your Voice"; 2. "Conversation Piece"	Steve Byrne, Ronnie Stone – songwriting; Publisher: Hit and Run / April Music
1984	Foxhole: Peak chart position: UK No. 105; Format: 7" Vinyl; Label: Inevitable Records (Cat. INEV 14)	1. "Foxhole" (3:42); 2. "Furnished Heart" (4:02)	Steve Byrne, Ronnie Stone – songwriting; Producer: Dave Bascombe
1984	Seeking Professional Advice: Format: 7" Vinyl; Label: Inevitable Records (Cat. INEV 17)	1. "Seeking Professional Advice"; 2. "My 10,000 Mile Home"	Steve Byrne, Ronnie Stone – songwriting; Producers: Ronnie Stone, Gil Norton
1985	Today/Tomorrow: Format: 7" Vinyl; Label: Inevitable / RCA (Cat. ZB 40305)	1. "Today/Tomorrow"; 2. "Only A Boy"	Steve Byrne – vocals; Ronnie Stone – guitar, synthesizers; Clive Gee – keyboards; Track A produced by Ronnie Stone & Jerry Lewis; engineered by Keith Andrews; Track B produced by Ronnie Stone; backing tracks engineered by Gil Norton; Additional personnel: T. A. Griffiths & Gareth Hughes (trumpets on "Only A Boy")
1985	Touch (Re-Touch): Format: 7" Vinyl; Label: Inevitable / RCA (Cat. ZB 40167)	1. "Touch (Re-Touch)"; 2. "Personal Touch"	Steve Byrne, Ronnie Stone – songwriting

=== Compilation appearances ===
- 1982: Cracking Up at the Pyramid ("Touch" and "Exit The Happy Halo") – Crackin' Up Records
- 1984: Small Hits and Near Misses: The Inevitable Compilation ("Culture Won't Wait") – Inevitable Records
- 1990: The Invaders: The Inevitable Sampler Volume 2 ("Someone", credited as Someone) – Inevitable / Probe Plus
- 2018: Revolutionary Spirit: The Sound Of Liverpool 1976–1988 ("Touch") – Cherry Red Records
- 2019: Birth Of A Nation: Inevitable Records An Independent Liverpool 1979–1986 (14 tracks included) – Cherry Red Records
- 2019: Electrical Language: Independent British Synth Pop 78–84 ("Your Voice") – Cherry Red Records
