= Working with Fire and Steel – Possible Pop Songs Volume Two =

Working with Fire and Steel

Studio album by China Crisis
- Released: 31 October 1983
- Studios: Amazon (Liverpool); The Manor (Shipton-on-Cherwell)
- Genres: New wave; synth-pop
- Length: 40:23
- Label: Virgin
- Producer: Mike Howlett

China Crisis chronology
Difficult Shapes & Passive Rhythms, Some People Think It's Fun to Entertain (1982)	Working with Fire and Steel (1983)	Flaunt the Imperfection (1985)

Singles from Working with Fire and Steel
- 1. "Tragedy and Mystery" Released: 6 May 1983; 2. "Working with Fire and Steel" Released: 3 October 1983; 3. "Wishful Thinking" Released: 3 January 1984; 4. "Hanna Hanna" Released: 27 February 1984

Alternative cover
- CD cover

Working with Fire and Steel – Possible Pop Songs Volume Two is the second studio album by the English new wave and synth-pop band China Crisis, released on 31 October 1983 by Virgin Records.

The album spent 16 weeks on the UK Albums Chart, peaking at No. 20 in February 1984. It includes the song "Wishful Thinking", which was a top-ten hit on the UK Singles Chart.

== Background ==
After releasing their debut studio album Difficult Shapes & Passive Rhythms, Some People Think It's Fun to Entertain in late 1982, China Crisis made their first major tour supporting Simple Minds. Augmented by bass guitarist Gary Johnson, oboe player Steve Levy and drummer Kevin Wilkinson, the band premiered the songs "Wishful Thinking", "Here Come a Raincloud" (then called "Watching the Rainclouds") and "A Golden Handshake for Every Daughter" on a BBC John Peel session in January 1983. Having toured with China Crisis, Johnson and Levy was added as full-time members of the band.

== Recording ==
The album was recorded at Amazon Studios, Liverpool and completed at The Manor Studio, Oxfordshire in 1983. Some of the songs had been written around the same time as the songs on the band's debut studio album. The arrival of oboe and saxophone player Steve Levy and drummer Kevin Wilkinson into the band's line-up, along with the introduction of more session musicians, gave the album a markedly less synthetic sound than its predecessor. While the band made use of the then latest technology such as the emulator, introduced to them by producer Mike Howlett, they notably incorporated brass, woodwind and string instruments to their sound. During the album sessions the band also recorded the song "It's Never Too Late", but it was dropped due to its similarity to "Wishful Thinking" and was later released on a limited edition 12" single of "Black Man Ray".

The song "Working with Fire and Steel" became the albums lead single and provided the album title. The additional "Possible Pop Songs" title was inspired by Jon Hassell's collaboration with Brian Eno on their studio album Fourth World, Vol. 1: Possible Musics (1980).

== Single releases ==
"Tragedy and Mystery" was released as a single in May 1983 with "A Golden Handshake for Every Daughter" as its B-side, peaking at No. 46 on the UK Singles Chart. The title track "Working with Fire and Steel" was released as a single a few weeks before the album in October 1983 with two non-album instrumentals, "Dockland" and "Forever I and I", on the B-side, reaching No. 48 in the UK. "Wishful Thinking" was released in December and became the bands first and only Top 10 hit in the UK, peaking at No. 9 in January 1984. The fourth and final single "Hanna Hanna" was released in March 1984 with a live version of "African and White" as the B-side, reaching No. 44.

== Critical reception ==
Professional ratings
Review scores
Source	Rating
AllMusic	4/5 stars
Smash Hits	7/10 stars

Upon its release in October 1983, the album received a 7 out of 10 rating in Smash Hits. "Sometimes this lot are annoyingly hazy, moody, abstract", Dave Rimmer wrote, "At others they're capable of sound tunes, bright rhythms and sterling stuff." Billboard said that the album "builds upon [the band's] command of subtler instrumental and vocal effects amid the prominent electronic elements of their style."

Trouser Press found the album to be an improvement from their debut album: "Sax and/or oboe (!) appears on all but two tracks, with more horns on occasion and even strings (real and synth). Mike Howlett’s production, plus a new drummer and a permanent bassist, help the group attain a bit more sonic snap; the lyrics are less tortured, if just as thoughtfully and melancholically personal."

In a retrospective review for AllMusic, critic Stephen Schnee described the album as "chock full of intelligent, well-written pop songs" where "even the softer moments...are full of life and excitement". The reviewer noted that the band moved away from their early synth-pop-style to more ambitious ideas with "Producer Mike Howlett added much to the sonic blend, allowing the melodies to shine while toughening up the band's sound... Apart from their own matured sound on this release, there are traces of rock, pop, and jazz floating between the lines."

Spin wrote, "This record clearly was pop — immaculately recorded, with catchy melodies and all the right sounds in the right places. Songs like "Tragedy and Mystery", "Animals and Jungles", and the title cut were pop in every sense of the word, though their meanings were too precious and couched in metaphor."

== 40th anniversary ==
In autumn 2023, the band performed the whole album live in a series of concerts across the UK.

== Track listing ==
All tracks are written by Gary Daly and Eddie Lundon.

Side one
No.	Title	Length
1.	"Working with Fire and Steel"	3:41
2.	"When the Piper Calls"	4:04
3.	"Hanna Hanna"	3:29
4.	"Animals in Jungles"	3:40
5.	"Here Come a Raincloud" (retitled "Here Comes a Raincloud" on 2017 reissue)	4:16

Side two
No.	Title	Length
6.	"Wishful Thinking"	4:42
7.	"Tragedy and Mystery"	4:03
8.	"Papua"	3:36
9.	"The Gates of Door to Door"	4:16
10.	"The Soul Awakening"	4:36
Total length:		40:23

In 2017, the album was re-released as a 3 CD 'Super Deluxe' edition by Caroline Records. This 37 track set included rare extended versions, demos plus John Peel and Kid Jensen radio sessions. Many of these tracks appeared on CD for the first time; however, there were some strange omissions and additions. The track "Some People I Know to Lead Fantastic Lives" was originally on the band's debut studio album Difficult Shapes & Passive Rhythms, Some People Think It's Fun to Entertain (1982) yet that same album version is included as well as the extended mix. There is no extended version of "Wishful Thinking" yet the very same album version appears twice.

== Personnel ==
Credits are adapted from the Working with Fire and Steel – Possible Pop Songs Volume Two liner notes.

China Crisis

- Gary Daly — vocals; synthesizer; grand piano; E-mu Emulator; tape
- Eddie Lundon — acoustic and electric guitars; synthesizer; E-mu Emulator; vocals
- Gary "Gazza" Johnson — bass guitar; fretless bass; bass harmonica
- Kevin Wilkinson — drums; percussion (not yet an official member of the band)

Additional musicians

- Steve Levy — saxophone (tracks 1–3); oboe (tracks 5–7)
- Graeme Levy — voice (Russian dialect) (track 1)
- Roddy Lorimer — trumpet (tracks 2 and 3)
- Anthony Thistlethwaite — tenor saxophone (tracks 2 and 3)
- Jane Lancaster — vocals (tracks 5 and 9)
- Robert Pollard — synthesiser (track 7)
- Luke Tunney — flugelhorn (track 7)
- Gary Barnacle — flute (track 9)
- The Breck Road String Ensemble — strings (track 5)

== Charts ==
=== Weekly charts ===
Chart (1983–1984)	Peak position
Australian Albums (ARIA)	37
Canada Top Albums/CDs (RPM)	36
Dutch Albums (Album Top 100)	7
German Albums (Offizielle Top 100)	36
New Zealand Albums (RMNZ)	14
Swedish Albums (Sverigetopplistan)	32
UK Albums (Official Charts)	20

=== Year-end charts ===
Chart (1984)	Position
Dutch Albums (Album Top 100)	41

== Certifications ==
Region	Certification	Certified units/sales
United Kingdom (BPI)	Gold	100,000^{^}
^{^} Shipments figures based on certification alone.
