= Toy box =

Toy box, Toy Box, or Toybox may refer to:

- a box for storing toys

== Television and film ==
- Toybox (TV series), an Australian children's television series
- The Toy Box, a 2017 American reality television series
- The Toybox, a 2018 American supernatural thriller film
- DS-12 Toy Box, the protagonists' ship in the science fiction manga and anime series Planetes

== Music ==
- Toy-Box, a Danish pop group
- "Toy Box", song by horrorcore group Insane Clown Posse
- Toy:Box, deluxe edition of the posthumous David Bowie album Toy (2021)
- Toybox Records, a record label that existed from 1992 to 1997

== Other ==
- Officer Robyn "Toybox" Slinger, a fictional character in the comic book series Top 10
- Toybox, a suite of Linux command line utilities
- Toybox, a feature in the sandbox physics game Garry's Mod
- Toybox Turbos, a 2014 racing video game
- Toys "R" Us, who opened pop up stores known as "Geoffrey's Toy Box"

== See also ==
- Box of Toys, a British new wave band
- David Parker Ray, also known as the "Toy-Box Killer", a suspected American serial killer
