= Tell Tale Signs =

Tell Tale Signs may refer to:

- The Bootleg Series Vol. 8: Tell Tale Signs: Rare and Unreleased 1989–2006, Bob Dylan
- "Tell Tale Signs", song by Bananarama from the album Deep Sea Skiving
- "Tell Tale Signs", song by China Crisis from the album Autumn in the Neighbourhood
- "Tell Tale Signs", song by Kylie Minogue from the album Enjoy Yourself
- "Tell Tale Signs", song by Jerry Lee Lewis from the album I-40 Country
- "Tell Tale Signs", song by Frank Turner from the album Tape Deck Heart
