= Flaunt the Imperfection =

Studio album by China Crisis
- Released: 29 April 1985
- Studio: Parkgate Studio (Battle, East Sussex)
- Genres: New wave; synth-pop; sophisti-pop
- Length: 43:04
- Label: Virgin
- Producer: Walter Becker

China Crisis chronology
Working with Fire and Steel – Possible Pop Songs Volume Two (1983)	Flaunt the Imperfection (1985)	What Price Paradise (1986)

Singles from Flaunt the Imperfection
- 1. "Black Man Ray" Released: 4 March 1985; 2. "King in a Catholic Style" Released: 20 May 1985; 3. "You Did Cut Me" Released: 27 August 1985; 4. "The Highest High" Released: 11 November 1985

Flaunt the Imperfection is the third studio album by the English new wave and synth-pop band China Crisis, released on 29 April 1985 by Virgin Records.

The album was produced by Steely Dan co-founder Walter Becker, who is credited as an official member of China Crisis on the record sleeve. Becker apparently requested to meet with the band after hearing their song "Papua" from their previous studio album Working with Fire and Steel – Possible Pop Songs Volume Two (1983). He was subsequently signed on as producer to begin work on the album with the assistance of Phill Brown, sound engineer with the Rolling Stones and Jimi Hendrix.

The album is the most successful by the band, peaking at No. 9 on the UK Albums Chart and staying for 22 weeks. The singles "Black Man Ray" and "King in a Catholic Style" both reached the Top 20 in the UK Singles Chart.

== Background and recording ==
Having toured extensively in Europe and North America with Simple Minds, Gary Daly and Eddie Lundon decided to have a break and work independently for a while. Daly wrote and demoed tracks at his mother's house including the song Black Man Ray, which would be the album's first single.

When asked by their record label who they wanted to produce their next album, Daly proposed Brian Eno while Lundon jokingly suggested Steely Dan's sound engineer Gary Katz. The record label representative then said they could get them in touch with Steely Dan's Walter Becker himself. Unknowingly to the band, Becker was a fan of their previous album Working with Fire and Steel – Possible Pop Songs Volume Two and agreed to work with them.

With Flaunt the Imperfection the band worked with a different approach than their previous album. While the songs on Working with Fire and Steel – Possible Pop Songs Volume Two were mostly written in the studio by Daly and Lundon and instantly recorded, the songs on this album were written and rehearsed as a band in advance before recording. The first recording sessions with Walter Becker took place at Rock City Studios, Shepperton, playing their songs live in the studio and putting them to tape. They then moved to the better equipped Parkgate Studios in Sussex to finish the album. The band worked closely and creatively with Becker, and also credited session keyboard player Nick Magnus for significant contributions and realizing ideas they had but could not achieve themselves. Another renewal of the band's sound was Eddie Lundon's use of a guitar synthesizer.

== Critical reception ==
Professional ratings
Review scores
Source	Rating
AllMusic	4.5/5 stars
Smash Hits	8.5/10 stars

In an article in Electronics & Music Maker magazine just prior to the release of the album, Dan Goldstein noted that "[Eddie Lundon's] playing is only one of many positive points on Flaunt the Imperfection. Other qualities that shine through after only a casual listening are an improvement in the clarity of singer Garry's vocal delivery, a tighter 'band' feel to the playing as a whole and, conversely, a looser, more relaxed atmosphere that must go down to the influence of Becker."

Upon its release the album received several positive reviews. Smash Hits reviewer Ian Cranna found that "mostly it's simply sublime" and "Easily their most consistent and stylish set yet".

Spin wrote, "There are no feigned gestures, showbiz tricks, or overly glossy sound here. China Crisis records lofty and meditative music at the risk of losing its dance-club appeal — something that limits this record's chances of being played by anything but adventurous stations and on college new-wave hours."

Trouser Press noted the influence by Becker's Steely Dan on some songs, but wrote that "it’s far more obviously a refinement of the band’s own style. The lyrical art seems so artless, the musical airiness so effortless; like the first album, it’s almost too subtle for its own good. (Almost.)"

In a retrospective review, Stewart Mason of AllMusic notes that "the group's songwriting is much improved, [with] the failed instrumental experiments and tiresome dance workouts that occasionally marred their earlier albums replaced with a newfound melodic sophistication and lyrical acuity."

== Track listing ==
All tracks written by Gary Daly, Gary Johnson and Eddie Lundon.

1. "The Highest High" – 4:16
2. "Strength of Character" – 2:50
3. "You Did Cut Me" – 4:18
4. "Black Man Ray" – 3:39
5. "Wall of God" – 5:32
6. "Gift of Freedom" – 4:38
7. "King in a Catholic Style" – 4:32
8. "Bigger the Punch I'm Feeling" – 4:21
9. "The World Spins, I'm Part of It" – 4:12
10. "Blue Sea" – 4:46

== Personnel ==
China Crisis

- Gary Daly – vocals; synthesizer
- Eddie Lundon – guitar; vocals
- Walter Becker – synthesizer; percussion
- Gary "Gazza" Johnson – bass; programming
- Kevin Wilkinson – drums; percussion

Additional personnel

- Tim Renwick – all guitar solos
- Steve Gregory – saxophone
- Nick Magnus – grand piano; synthesizer; programming
- Tim Sanders – tenor and soprano saxophone
- Simon Clarke – alto and baritone saxophone; flute
- Roddy Lorimer – trumpet; flugelhorn
- Peter Thoms – trombone
- Colin Campsie – backing vocals
- Ginny Clee – backing vocals

== Charts ==
=== Weekly charts ===
Chart (1985)	Peak position
Australian Albums (Kent Music Report)	38
Canada Top Albums/CDs (RPM)	21
Dutch Albums (Album Top 100)	14
New Zealand Albums (RMNZ)	6
Swedish Albums (Sverigetopplistan)	18
UK Albums (Official Charts)	9
US Billboard 200	171

=== Year-end charts ===
Chart (1985)	Position
New Zealand Albums (RMNZ)	35

== Certifications and sales ==
Region	Certification	Certified units/sales
New Zealand (RMNZ)	Gold	7,500^{^}
United Kingdom (BPI)	Gold	100,000^{^}
^{^} Shipments figures based on certification alone.
