= Wishful Thinking (China Crisis song) =

Single by China Crisis

from the album Working with Fire and Steel – Possible Pop Songs Volume Two
- B-side: "This Occupation"; "Some People I Know to Lead Fantastic Lives"
- Released: 9 January 1984
- Recorded: 1983
- Genre: New wave
- Length: 4:08 (7" single edit); 4:40 (12" single / album version)
- Label: Virgin
- Songwriters: Gary Daly; Eddie Lundon
- Producer: Mike Howlett

China Crisis singles chronology
"Working with Fire and Steel" (1983)	"Wishful Thinking" (1984)	"Hanna Hanna" (1984)

Music video
- "Wishful Thinking" on YouTube

"Wishful Thinking" is a song by the English new wave and synth-pop band China Crisis, released as the third single from their second studio album Working with Fire and Steel – Possible Pop Songs Volume Two (1983). It reached No. 9 on the UK singles chart in early 1984, becoming their only top 10 hit single in their homeland. The song is their biggest and most well-known hit, and is included on numerous compilation albums. It was a top 20 hit in several European countries and hit number one on the Swedish radio chart Poporama on 8 March 1984.

The lead vocals on this track are sung by Eddie Lundon who also wrote the lyrics, as opposed to Gary Daly who sings lead vocals on the majority of the band's songs. The song was inspired by the song "Here He Comes" on Brian Eno's fifth solo studio album Before and After Science (1977).

== Critical reception ==
Smash Hits characterised the song as "light and airy pop with a dimple in its cheek". They called it "quite pleasant" but believed that some of the production choices were "beginning to sound dangerously dated".

== B-sides ==
The track "This Occupation" remains exclusive to this release and appears in two very different forms on the 7" and 12" releases. "Some People I Know to Lead Fantastic Lives" is taken from the band's debut studio album Difficult Shapes & Passive Rhythms, Some People Think It's Fun to Entertain (1982), although the remix on this 12" single remains exclusive to this release.

== Track listing ==
=== 7" vinyl single ===
All tracks are written by Gary Daly and Eddie Lundon.

Side one
No.	Title	Length
1.	"Wishful Thinking"	4:08

Side two
No.	Title	Length
2.	"This Occupation"	2:41

=== 12" vinyl single ===
Side one
No.	Title	Writer(s)	Length
1.	"Wishful Thinking"	Daly; Lundon	4:38
2.	"Some People I Know to Lead Fantastic Lives"	Daly; Lundon; Dave Reilly	3:43

Side two
No.	Title	Writer(s)	Length
1.	"This Occupation (Extended Mix)"	Daly; Lundon	4:00
2.	"Some People I Know to Lead Fantastic Lives (Extended Mix)"	Daly; Lundon; Reilly	6:07

== Chart performance ==
Chart (1984)	Peak position
UK Singles (Official Charts)	9
Germany (GfK)	16
Ireland (IRMA)	6
Netherlands (Dutch Top 40)	14
