= Box of Toys =

British new wave band

- Origin: Liverpool, England
- Genres: New wave, synth-pop
- Years active: 1982–1984
- Label: Inevitable Records
- Past members: Brian Atherton; Andy Redhead; Phil Martin; Roy Campbell

Box of Toys were a short-lived English new wave and synth-pop band from Liverpool, consisting of Brian Atherton (lead vocals and keyboards), Andy Redhead (drums and guitar), Phil Martin (saxophone, keyboards, and vocals), and Roy Campbell (bass and vocals). They recorded a John Peel session for BBC Radio 1 in 1983 and released two singles on Inevitable Records named "I'm Thinking of You Now" (1983) and "Precious Is the Pearl" (1984) before disbanding.

== History ==
Box of Toys were formed from several interconnected Liverpool post-punk and powerpop groups of the early 1980s. Before forming the band, bassist Roy Campbell and saxophonist Phil Martin had both played in Snapshots (an early incarnation of 3D A Fish in Sea alongside guitarist John "Riff" Reynolds, vocalist Richie Holmes, and keyboardist Steve Spurgin, in which Campbell switched from guitar to bass). Martin also appeared on a seven-track demo by A Select Committee (active 1981–1983), a powerpop group featuring drummer and keyboardist Andy Redhead alongside Brian Jones, Tim Lees, and Steve Downey. Around the breakup of A Select Committee, Redhead and Martin teamed up with Campbell and singer-songwriter Brian Atherton to form Box of Toys in 1982.

The band signed to Liverpool independent label Inevitable Records, founded in 1979 by Pete Fulwell and Amazon Studios owner Jeremy J. Lewis. On 13 April 1983, before releasing any commercial single, the quartet recorded a session for John Peel's BBC Radio 1 program with four tracks: "Precious Is the Pearl", "When Daylight Is Over (Sunset)", "Time Takes Me Back", and "I'm Thinking of You Now". Later in 1983, they released their debut single, "I'm Thinking of You Now" (backed with "Old Man Rome"), followed in 1984 by "Precious Is the Pearl" (backed with "It Goes Without Saying" and, on the 12-inch edition, "When Daylight Is Over").

Critics later compared the band's music to Merseyside contemporaries Orchestral Manoeuvres in the Dark and China Crisis, while PopMatters described them as pairing "jaunty 1980s pop with a serious Midge Ure/Ultravox filter".

After Box of Toys disbanded in late 1984, Andy Redhead joined the new wave band 3D alongside John "Riff" Reynolds, Steve Spurgin, and Jon Corner, replacing drummer Brian Rawling, and both Redhead and Roy Campbell helped to former A Select Committee guitarist Steve Downey's solo project Lovers By Design, which recorded three demos between 1984 and 1986. Phil Martin maintained ties with Come in Tokio. Brian Atherton continued recording on Inevitable Records under the solo name The Light, releasing singles including "Contrasting Strangers" and "Pride of Winning".

In April 2019, Cherry Red Records included eight Box of Toys recordings-both studio singles with their B-sides and the complete 1983 Peel session—on the 3-CD retrospective box set Birth Of A Nation: Inevitable Records: An Independent Liverpool 1979–1986. Later in 2019, "I'm Thinking of You Now" was also featured on Cherry Red's 4-CD compilation Electrical Language: Independent British Synth Pop 78–84.

== Discography ==
=== Commercial Singles ===
Year	Release Details	Tracklist	Personnel & Label Credits
1983	"I'm Thinking of You Now": Format: 7" Single; Label: Inevitable Records; Catalog: INEV 13	A-Side: "I'm Thinking of You Now"; B-Side: "Old Man Rome"	Lineup: Brian Atherton (vocals, keyboards), Andy Redhead (drums), Phil Martin (saxophone), Roy Campbell (bass).; Production: Jeremy Lewis.
1984	"Precious Is the Pearl": Format: 7" & 12" Single; Label: Inevitable Records; Catalog: INEV 15 (7") / 12 INEV T15 (12")	7" Edition: A-Side: "Precious Is the Pearl"; B-Side: "It Goes Without Saying"; 12" Edition: A-Side: "Precious Is the Pearl"; B-Side: "It Goes Without Saying" / "When Daylight Is Over"	Lineup: Brian Atherton (vocals, keyboards), Andy Redhead (drums), Phil Martin (saxophone), Roy Campbell (bass).; Production: Jeremy Lewis.

=== Compilations ===
Year	Release Details	Tracklist & Box-Set Layout	Notes
2019	Birth Of A Nation: Inevitable Records: An Independent Liverpool 1979–1986: Format: 3-CD Box Set; Label: Cherry Red Records; Catalog: CDTRED755	Studio Singles (CD2): CD2, Track 3: "I'm Thinking Of You Now"; CD2, Track 4: "Old Man Rome"; CD2, Track 7: "Precious Is The Pearl"; CD2, Track 8: "It Goes Without Saying"; John Peel Session (CD3): CD3, Track 17: "Precious In The Pearl"; CD3, Track 18: "When Daylight Is Over (Sunset)"; CD3, Track 19: "Time Takes Me Back"; CD3, Track 20: "Thinking Of You Now"	Disc 3 contains the band's complete BBC Radio 1 John Peel session originally recorded on 13 April 1983.; Also includes four tracks by Brian Atherton's post-Box of Toys project The Light on Disc 2 ("Contrasting Strangers", "Monument", "Pride Of Winning", and "Ten Million Years").
2019	Electrical Language: Independent British Synth Pop 78–84: Format: 4-CD Box Set (reissued 2025); Label: Cherry Red Records	CD1, Track 16: "I'm Thinking Of You Now"	Reissued in a 4-CD clamshell box edition in October 2025.
