= What Price Paradise =

Studio album by China Crisis
- Released: 24 November 1986
- Recorded: Summer 1986
- Studios: The Manor Studio, Shipton-on-Cherwell, Oxfordshire and Westside Studios, London
- Genre: New wave
- Length: 45:36
- Label: Virgin
- Producers: Clive Langer, Alan Winstanley

China Crisis chronology
Flaunt the Imperfection (1985)	What Price Paradise (1986)	Diary of a Hollow Horse (1989)

Singles from What Price Paradise
- 1. "Arizona Sky" Released: 13 October 1986; 2. "Best Kept Secret" Released: 12 January 1987

Professional ratings
Review scores
Source	Rating
Allmusic	4/5 stars

What Price Paradise is the fourth studio album by English new wave group China Crisis. The first album to feature new keyboardist Brian McNeil, it included songs that now credited all five bandmembers as songwriters.

Although the album's lead-off single, "Arizona Sky" only saw modest success in the band's homeland and Australia (not reaching the top 40 in either country), it became a breakthrough hit in North America, cracking the top 40 on the U.S. Billboard Adult Contemporary charts (at number 37). Follow-up single "Best Kept Secret" was slightly more successful in the U.K. than its predecessor, reaching number 36 on the British charts, though it did not chart in the U.S.

The album itself peaked at number 114 on the U.S. Billboard 200, becoming the band's highest charting album stateside, while peaking at 63 in the U.K., paling in comparison to the success of their previous album in their native country.

The album was released on CD, LP and Cassette in 1986. The CD version featured one bonus track: "Trading in Gold", originally released on the B-side of the "Arizona Sky" single.

A three CD deluxe edition of the album was released in January 2022. As well as a remaster of the original album, it also featured B-sides, previously unheard four-track demos and a 1987 live performance at the Liverpool Empire.

== Track listing ==
All tracks written by Gary Daly, Gary "Gazza" Johnson, Eddie Lundon, Brian McNeill and Kevin Wilkinson, except where stated.

1. "It's Everything" – 5:09
2. "Arizona Sky" – 5:24
3. "Safe as Houses" – 4:26
4. "Worlds Apart" (Daly, Johnson, Lundon, McNeill, Wilkinson, Kevin Kelly) – 3:35
5. "Hampton Beach" – 4:47
6. "The Understudy" – 5:45
7. "Best Kept Secret" – 4:08
8. "We Do the Same" – 4:21
9. "June Bride" – 3:50
10. "A Day's Work for the Dayo's Done" – 4:17
11. "Trading in Gold" – 4:27 (Only appears on the CD version)

== Personnel ==
China Crisis

- Gary Daly – vocals
- Eddie Lundon – guitar, vocals
- Brian McNeill – synthesizer, vocals
- Gary "Gazza" Johnson – bass
- Kevin Wilkinson – drums, percussion

with:

- Stuart Nisbet - guitar
- Gary Barnacle - saxophone, flute
- Luke Tunney - trumpet, flugelhorn
- Pete Thoms - trombone
- Martin Ditcham - percussion
- Davie Dover, John Lewis - backing vocals
- David Bedford - string arrangements, conductor

== Critical reception ==
Switching to producers Clive Langer and Alan Winstanley, Trouser Press found that "The sound has more edge to it, yet is somehow less delicate, less distinctive than on previous albums. In fact, the vocals (lead and backing) on one track are so different that the group is nearly unrecognizable. Still, it pretty much is China Crisis; if the songs occasionally seem more conventionally written, they’re still attractive, even almost (gulp) commercial." In Record Mirror, Andy Strickland noted how the group were "..beginning to mature into subtle mood songwriters and more than competent musicians, making 'adult' albums... I like it".
