= Hanna Hanna =

Single by China Crisis

from the album Working with Fire and Steel – Possible Pop Songs Volume Two
- Released: 27 February 1984
- Genre: New wave; synth-pop
- Length: 3:29
- Label: Virgin
- Songwriters: Gary Daly; Eddie Lundon
- Producer: Mike Howlett

China Crisis singles chronology
| "Wishful Thinking" (1984) | "Hanna Hanna" (1984) | "Black Man Ray" (1985) |

Music video
- "Hanna Hanna" on YouTube

"Hanna Hanna" is a song by the English new wave and synth-pop band China Crisis. It was released as the fourth single from their second studio album Working with Fire and Steel – Possible Pop Songs Volume Two (1983) and reached No. 44 on the UK singles chart.

Written around the same time as the songs on their debut studio album, a synth-pop version of "Hanna Hanna" was premiered in a Kid Jensen session for the BBC in May 1982.

== Track listing ==
UK 7" single

1. "Hanna Hanna" – 3.25
2. "African and White" (Live) – 3.48

UK 12" single

1. "Hanna Hanna" (Extended Mix) – 5.17
2. "Here Come a Raincloud" (Live) – 6.00
3. "African and White" (Live) – 3.48
