= Diary of a Hollow Horse =

Studio album by China Crisis
- Released: 2 May 1989
- Studios: Lahaina Sound, Maui, Hawaii; Village Recorder, Los Angeles; Townhouse Studio 3, London; Sigma Sound, New York; Stereo Society, New York; Amazon Studios, Liverpool
- Genres: New wave, art rock
- Length: 43:46 (CD), 42:52 (LP)
- Label: Virgin
- Producers: Walter Becker, Mike Thorne, China Crisis

China Crisis chronology
What Price Paradise (1986)	Diary of a Hollow Horse (1989)	Diary: A Collection (1992)

Singles from Diary of a Hollow Horse
- 1. "Saint Saviour Square" Released: 28 March 1989; 2. "Red Letter Day" Released: 30 May 1989

Diary of a Hollow Horse is the fifth studio album by English new wave group China Crisis, released in 1989. It was released on CD, LP and Cassette. The original CD version features the bonus track "Back Home".

Described as "perhaps their most Steely Dan-like album", the first single released was St. Saviour Square, originally recorded by Walter Becker and subsequently by Mike Thorne, whose version ended up on the album, despite the band considering Becker's version better.

The song lyrics refer to a demolished housing estate (now site of the Liverpool Women's Hospital) located in the square of the same name (now called Crown Street) west of Upper Parliament Street in the Toxteth area of Liverpool. Gary Daly recalls that:

I would walk into town most days and hook up with everyone at rehearsals. The walk took me thru a relatively new housing estate, which had fallen prey to horrible neglect. I think with me just becoming a father for the first time shaped my thoughts and helped fashion the lyrics for St. Saviour Square.

The follow-up single would be Red Letter Day. The album did not chart well in the UK given the lack of promotion by Virgin, which also shelved the video prepared for the first single. The album would be the last recorded by the band and distributed by Virgin.

A digitally remastered double-CD edition was published in May 2013 by Cherry Red Records, which includes the original, previously unreleased Walter Becker-produced versions of Red Letter Day, St. Saviour Square and All My Prayers.

== Critical reception ==
Professional ratings
Review scores
Source	Rating
AllMusic	3/5 stars
Record Mirror	3/5 stars

In Record Mirror the album received a lukewarm review, Eleanor Levy wrote: "'Diary Of A Hollow Horse' treads the usual China Crisis tightrope of mature, enduringly atmospheric songs and pleasant-to-the-point-of blandness background music. Only this time, two thirds of the tracks fall disappointingly into the latter category."

David Spodek, reviewer of RPM, expressed an opinion that "this release is proof enough that the choice of producer will certainly influence how an album will sound." As per him Walter Becker brings a lot of Steely Dan sound into the record, "and it makes for very smooth listening from beginning to end".

Trouser Press also noted Becker's contributions to band's sound and found that "Diary is no match for their finest work, but a gratifying effort all the same."

== Track listing ==
=== Original version ===
All tracks written by Gary Daly, Gary Johnson, Eddie Lundon, Brian McNeill and Kevin Wilkinson

All tracks produced by Walter Becker, except 1, 6, 9 produced by Mike Thorne, and 2 produced by Walter Becker and China Crisis

1. "St. Saviour Square" – 4:09
2. "Stranger By Nature" – 3:56
3. "Sweet Charity in Adoration" – 4:51
4. "Day After Day" – 5:07
5. "Diary of a Hollow Horse" – 3:15
6. "Red Letter Day" – 4:38
7. "In Northern Skies" – 5:02
8. "Singing the Praises of Finer Things" – 5:20
9. "All My Prayers" – 4:04
10. "Age Old Need" – 3:21
11. "Back Home" – 3:54 (Only appears on the CD version)

=== 2013 version ===
This version was issued in full consultation with Gary Daly of China Crisis and includes the original Walter Becker-produced tracks, band demo and live versions.

Disc A

1. "St. Saviour Square" (original Walter Becker production) – 5:27
2. "Stranger By Nature" – 4:04
3. "Sweet Charity in Adoration" – 4:53
4. "Day After Day" – 5:07
5. "Diary of a Hollow Horse" – 3:15
6. "Red Letter Day" (original Walter Becker production) – 5:24
7. "In Northern Skies" – 5:02
8. "Singing the Praises of Finer Things" – 5:20
9. "All My Prayers" (original Walter Becker production) – 4:04
10. "Age Old Need" – 3:21
11. "Back Home" – 3:54
12. "St. Saviour Square" (Extended 12" Mike Thorne Mix) 6:17
13. "Diary of a Hollow Horse" (acoustic version) 3:37
14. "All My Prayers" (Extended 12" Mike Thorne Mix) 6:10
15. "Red Letter Day" (Bazilington DJ Vibe Mix) 4:03

Stranger By Nature is listed in the CD booklet as "Uncompressed Version".

Disc B

1. "St. Saviour Square" (Mike Thorne Re-Recorded version) 4:09
2. "Red Letter Day" (Mike Thorne Re-Recorded version) 4:39
3. "All My Prayers" (Mike Thorne Re-Recorded version) 4:05
4. "St. Saviour Square" (Band demo) 6:25
5. "Stranger By Nature" (Band demo) 4:23
6. "In Northern Skies" (Band demo) 5:12
7. "Sweet Charity in Adoration" (Band demo) 4:49
8. "Diary of a Hollow Horse" (Band demo) 3:35
9. "Singing the Praises of Finer Things" (Band demo) 6:11
10. "All My Prayers" (Band demo) 5:29
11. "Red Letter Day" (Band demo) 6:01
12. "Age Old Need" (Band demo) 3:13
13. "St. Saviour Square" (Live version) 4:07
14. "All My Prayers" (Live version) 4:14

== Personnel ==
China Crisis

- Gary Daly – vocals
- Eddie Lundon – acoustic & electric guitars, backing vocals
- Brian McNeill – keyboards, backing vocals, marimba
- Gary "Gazza" Johnson – bass
- Kevin Wilkinson – drums, percussion, bouzouki

with:

- Tim Weston - electric guitar
- Robbie Buchanan - keyboards on "Day After Day", piano on "Singing the Praises of Finer Things"
- Paulinho Da Costa - percussion on "Sweet Charity in Adoration"
- Jim Horn - flute on "Sweet Charity in Adoration", saxophone on "Diary of a Hollow Horse"
- Walter Becker - synthesizer on "Diary of a Hollow Horse"
- Angie Jaree, Conrad Reeder, Linda Harmon, Maxine Waters, Myrna Matthews - backing vocals
