= Inevitable Records =

- Founded: 1979
- Founder: Jeremy J. Lewis; Pete Fulwell
- Status: Defunct (1986)
- Distributors: Independent (1979–1982); RCA Ltd. (1982–1986)
- Genre: Post-punk, new wave, synth-pop, indie pop
- Country of origin: United Kingdom
- Location: Amazon Recording Studios, Kirkby (later Liverpool, England)

Inevitable Records was a British independent record label based in Liverpool, England. Active between 1979 and 1986, the label released early recordings by several Merseyside post-punk, new wave, and synth-pop acts, including Wah!, Dead or Alive, China Crisis, and It's Immaterial.

== History ==
Inevitable Records was founded in 1979 by musician and sound engineer Jeremy J. Lewis alongside Pete Fulwell, manager of the Liverpool music venue Eric's Club. Lewis owned Amazon Studios in Kirkby, where the label's early songs were recorded before the studio moved to central Liverpool.

The label's debut release was the 1979 single "Better Scream" / "Joe" by Pete Wylie's group Wah! Heat, followed by "Seven Minutes to Midnight" in 1980. In 1980, Pete Burn's band Nightmare in Wax released the EP Birth of a Nation (INEV 002) on the label. The band later changed its name to Dead or Alive and released the singles "Flowers", "I'm Falling", and "Number Eleven" on Inevitable before signing with Epic Records. Other early releases included the single "Euthenics" by post-punk band Modern Eon and tracks by Faction and It's Immaterial.

In 1981, Kirkby duo China Crisis released their debut single, "African and White", on Inevitable Records. It was a hit on the UK Independent Chart and led to a deal with Virgin Records. During the early 1980s, Inevitable partnered with RCA Ltd for nationwide distribution. Later releases included singles by Freeze Frame, Box of Toys, and The Light (formed by Box of Toys' Brian Atherton), and actress Margox (Margi Clarke).

Artists on the label recorded John Peel sessions for BBC Radio 1 between 1980 and 1983. In 1984, the label released the compilation album Small Hits and Near Misses... by Inevitable Records. In April 2019, Cherry Red Records issued a retrospective 3-CD box set, Birth Of A Nation: Inevitable Records An Independent Liverpool 1979–1986, containing the label's catalog and BBC Radio 1 sessions.

== Selected roster ==
- Box of Toys
- China Crisis
- Dead or Alive (including Nightmares in Wax)
- Faction
- Freeze Frame
- It's Immaterial
- Margox
- Modern Eon
- The Light
- Wah! (as Wah! Heat)

== Selected discography ==
Catalog No.	Artist	Title	Format	Year
INEV 001	Wah! Heat	"Better Scream" / "Joe"	7" single	1979
INEV 002	Nightmares in Wax	Birth of a Nation EP	7" EP	1980
INEV 003	Modern Eon	"Euthenics" / "Waiting for the Cavalry"	7" single	1980
INEV 004	Wah! Heat	"Seven Minutes to Midnight"	7" single	1980
INEV 005	Dead or Alive	"I'm Falling" / "Flowers"	7" single	1980
INEV 006	Faction	Faction	LP album	1981
INEV 007	Faction	"Faction" / "Wrong Again"	7" single	1981
INEV 008	Dead or Alive	"Number Eleven"	7" single	1981
INEV 009	It's Immaterial	"A Gigantic Raft in the Philippines"	7" single	1981
INEV 011	China Crisis	"African and White"	7" single	1982
INEV 12	Freeze Frame	"Your Voice" / "Conversation Piece"	7" single	1983
INEV 013	Box of Toys	"I'm Thinking of You Now"	7" single	1983
INEV 14	Freeze Frame	"Foxhole" / "Furnished Heart"	7" single	1984
INEV 015	Box of Toys	"Precious Is the Pearl"	7" / 12" single	1984
INEV 17	Freeze Frame	"Seeking Professional Advice" / "My 10,000 Mile Home"	7" single	1984
INEV 18	Freeze Frame	"Touch"	7" single	1985
INEV LP 1	Various artists	Small Hits and Near Misses...	LP compilation	1984
