= Jeremy J. Lewis =

British record producer and sound engineer

- Occupations: Record producer, sound engineer, entrepreneur
- Organization: JJL Guitars
- Known for: Founder of Amazon Studios, Parr Street Studios, and Inevitable Records

Jeremy J. Lewis is a British record producer, sound engineer, and entrepreneur. He is best known as the founder of Amazon Studios and Parr Street Studios in Liverpool, as well as co-founder of the independent record label Inevitable Records.

== Career ==
=== Amazon Studios and Inevitable Records ===
In the early 1970s, Lewis acquired the assets of Liverpool Sound Enterprises and established Amazon Studios in Kirkby, near Liverpool, initially to record his own music before expanding it into a commercial studio complex.

In 1979, Lewis co-founded the independent label Inevitable Records alongside Eric's Club manager Pete Fulwell. Amazon Studios served as the primary recording facility for Inevitable's roster, which included early releases by Wah! Heat, Dead or Alive, and China Crisis. Lewis produced and engineered several of these recordings, including China Crisis's debut single "African and White" (1981) and tracks on their 1982 debut album Difficult Shapes & Passive Rhythms, Some People Think It's Fun to Entertain.

As demand for recording space outside London grew during the 1980s, Amazon Studios expanded its technical facilities, installing Solid State Logic and Neve mixing consoles. A wide range of prominent British acts recorded at the studio during this decade, including Echo & the Bunnymen (Ocean Rain), The Smiths (Meat Is Murder), and The Waterboys (This Is the Sea). In 1989, Lewis performed post-production and remixed the track "Nightwing" for Black Sabbath's fourteenth studio album, Headless Cross.

=== Parr Street Studios and later ventures ===
In 1992, Lewis relocated the studio complex to central Liverpool, designing and opening Parr Street Studios in partnership with Tony Smith. The 20,000-square-foot complex accommodated four recording rooms, accommodation, and commercial spaces. Operation of the facility was later taken over by Hit & Run Publishing in 1994.

In the mid-1990s, Lewis transitioned into the technology sector, establishing internet service provider Netscan UK. In April 2013, he founded JJL Guitars, manufacturing single-piece electric guitars with proprietary titanium hardware, for which he received a patent in 2017.
