= No More Blue Horizons (Fool, Fool, Fool) =

Single by China Crisis

from the album Difficult Shapes & Passive Rhythms, Some People Think It's Fun to Entertain
- Released: 18 October 1982
- Genre: New wave; synth-pop
- Length: 3:48
- Label: Virgin
- Songwriters: Gary Daly; Eddie Lundon; David Reilly
- Producer: Peter Walsh

China Crisis singles chronology
"Scream Down at Me" (1982)	"No More Blue Horizons (Fool, Fool, Fool)" (1982)	"Christian" (1982)

Official audio
- "No More Blue Horizons (Fool, Fool, Fool)" on YouTube

"No More Blue Horizons (Fool, Fool, Fool)" is a song by the English new wave and synth-pop band China Crisis, released as their third single on 18 October 1982 by Virgin Records. It is included on the band's debut studio album Difficult Shapes & Passive Rhythms, Some People Think It's Fun to Entertain (1982) and on the compilation album Collection: The Very Best of China Crisis (1990).

== Track listing ==
UK 7" single

1. "No More Blue Horizons (Fool, Fool, Fool)" – 3.45
2. "No Ordinary Lover" – 3.03

UK 12" single

1. "No More Blue Horizons (Fool, Fool, Fool)" – 5.02
2. "No Ordinary Lover" – 3.03
3. "Watching Over Burning Fields" – 6.22
