= You Did Cut Me =

1985 song by China Crisis

Single by China Crisis

from the album Flaunt the Imperfection
- Released: 27 August 1985
- Studio: Parkgate Studio (Battle, East Sussex)
- Genre: New wave
- Length: 4:18
- Label: Virgin
- Songwriters: Gary Daly; Eddie Lundon; Gazza Johnson
- Producer: Walter Becker

China Crisis singles chronology
"King in a Catholic Style" (1985)	"You Did Cut Me" (1985)	"The Highest High" (1985)

Official audio
- "You Did Cut Me" on YouTube

"You Did Cut Me" is a song by the English new wave band China Crisis. It was released as the third single from their third studio album Flaunt the Imperfection (1985) and reached No. 54 on the UK singles chart.

The B-side of the single is a live version of the song. It was also released as a 7" double pack and a 12" single including additional live tracks.

== Critical reception ==
Spin said the song showed, "Walter Becker's influence begins to come through clearly, and China Crisis starts giving us a clearer idea what its naïve melodies are all about. All their idealism and questioning takes the form of a journey toward spiritual discovery."

In Smash Hits, Dave Rimmer wrote, "China Crisis can be interesting when they try but here we find them plumbing the depths of cliche with the usual slow sax solo and useless words like, "A love incision, my inner-vison". A sad business."
