= Christian (song) =

Single by China Crisis

from the album Difficult Shapes & Passive Rhythms, Some People Think It's Fun to Entertain
- Released: 3 January 1983
- Studio: Strawberry South (Dorking)
- Genre: New wave; ambient
- Length: 5:37
- Label: Virgin
- Songwriters: Gary Daly; Eddie Lundon; David Reilly
- Producer: Peter Walsh

China Crisis singles chronology
"No More Blue Horizons (Fool, Fool, Fool)" (1982)	"Christian" (1983)	"Tragedy and Mystery" (1983)

"Christian" is a song by the English new wave band China Crisis. It was released as a single from their debut studio album Difficult Shapes & Passive Rhythms, Some People Think It's Fun to Entertain (1982) and was the band's first major success on the UK singles chart, peaking at number 12 in February 1983.

The track features an unusual sliding bassline; although this was played live by the band's bassist Gary Johnson on many occasions, the bass in the original recording was played on a fretless bass by Landscape bassist Andy Pask (who also co-wrote the theme from The Bill).

The lyrics of the song was inspired by images from World War I that lead vocalist and keyboardist Gary Daly had seen, while the title "Christian" was added when recording the song:

"The actual 'Christian' of the title was the name of a little boy, who was friends with a nephew of mine… I'd never heard of anyone having that name. And when recording the track in Strawberry South, Dorking with Pete Walsh producing, we had nothing happening in the middle eight. Pete asked if we had any ideas and I would have just sang "Christian" at the point where the music changes and it worked beautifully."

— Gary Daly, 2020

== Track listing ==
=== 7": Virgin / VS 562 (UK) ===
Side one

1. "Christian" – 4.10

Side two

1. "Greenacre Bay" – 3.51
2. "Performing Seals" – 2.45

=== 12": Virgin / VS 562-12 (UK) ===
Side one

1. "Christian" – 5.55

Side two

1. "Greenacre Bay" – 4.17
2. "Performing Seals" – 2.45
