= Working with Fire and Steel (song) =

Single by China Crisis

from the album Working with Fire and Steel – Possible Pop Songs Volume Two
- Released: 3 October 1983
- Genre: New wave; synth-pop
- Length: 3:41
- Label: Virgin
- Songwriters: Gary Daly; Eddie Lundon
- Producer: Mike Howlett

China Crisis singles chronology
"Tragedy and Mystery" (1983)	"Working with Fire and Steel" (1983)	"Wishful Thinking" (1983)

Music video
- "Working with Fire and Steel" on YouTube

"Working with Fire and Steel" is a song by the English new wave and synth-pop band China Crisis, released as the second single from their second studio album Working with Fire and Steel – Possible Pop Songs Volume Two (1983). It peaked at No. 48 on the UK singles chart and at No. 47 in Australia. It was also a hit on the US Billboard Hot Dance Club Songs chart where it reached No. 27.

== Critical reception ==
Spin said the song was, "pop in every sense of the word" but the meaning was, "too precious and couched in metaphor and the whole mix was too crowded with different sounds and instruments to be considered strictly pop. It was more than the average listener could decipher while watching MTV or tuning his car radio."

== Track listing ==
UK 7" single / 7" silver vinyl

1. "Working with Fire and Steel"
2. "Dockland"
3. "Forever I and I"

UK 12" single

1. "Working with Fire and Steel
2. "Fire and Steel" (Mix)
3. "Dockland"
4. "Forever I and I"

US 12" single (Warner Bros.)

1. "Working with Fire and Steel"
2. "Fire and Steel" (Mix)
3. "Dockland"
4. "Forever I and I"

Canada 7" single (Virgin)

1. "Working with Fire and Steel"
2. "Dockland"

Europe 7" single

1. "Working with Fire and Steel"
2. "Forever I and I"
