= King in a Catholic Style =

Single by China Crisis

from the album Flaunt the Imperfection
- Released: 20 May 1985
- Genre: New wave
- Length: 4:32
- Label: Virgin
- Songwriters: Gary Daly; Eddie Lundon; Gazza Johnson
- Producer: Walter Becker

China Crisis singles chronology
"Black Man Ray" (1985)	"King in a Catholic Style" (1985)	"You Did Cut Me" (1985)

Music video
- "King in a Catholic Style" on YouTube

"King in a Catholic Style" is a song by the English new wave band China Crisis. It was released as the second single from their third studio album Flaunt the Imperfection (1985), and reached No. 19 on the UK singles chart.

== Track listing ==
UK 7" single

1. "King in a Catholic Style" – 3:52
2. "Blue Sea" – 4:46

UK 12" single

1. "King in a Catholic Style" (Extended Version) – 7:34
2. "Blue Sea" – 4:46
3. "King in a Catholic Style" – 4:48
