= Tragedy and Mystery =

Single by China Crisis

from the album Working with Fire and Steel – Possible Pop Songs Volume Two
- Released: 6 May 1983
- Genre: New wave; synth-pop
- Length: 4:03
- Label: Virgin
- Songwriters: Gary Daly; Eddie Lundon
- Producer: Mike Howlett

China Crisis singles chronology
"Christian" (1982)	"Tragedy and Mystery" (1983)	"Working with Fire and Steel" (1983)

Music video
- "Tragedy and Mystery" on YouTube

"Tragedy and Mystery" is a song by the English new wave and synth-pop band China Crisis. It was released as the lead single from their second studio album Working with Fire and Steel – Possible Pop Songs Volume Two (1983) and reached No. 46 on the UK singles chart.

== Track listing ==
UK 7" single / 7" picture disc

1. "Tragedy and Mystery"
2. "A Golden Handshake for Every Daughter"

UK 12" single

1. "Tragedy and Mystery" – 5.25
2. "A Golden Handshake for Every Daughter" — 3.57
