= Black Man Ray =

Single by China Crisis

from the album Flaunt the Imperfection
- Released: 4 March 1985
- Studio: Parkgate Studio (Battle, East Sussex)
- Genre: New wave; synth-pop
- Length: 3:39
- Label: Virgin
- Songwriters: Gary Daly; Eddie Lundon; Gazza Johnson
- Producer: Walter Becker

China Crisis singles chronology
"Hanna Hanna" (1984)	"Black Man Ray" (1985)	"King in a Catholic Style" (1985)

Music video
- "Black Man Ray" on YouTube

"Black Man Ray" is a song by the English new wave band China Crisis. Released as the first single from their third studio album Flaunt the Imperfection (1985), it is one of the band's most successful singles. It spent 13 weeks on the UK singles chart and peaked at No. 14 in April 1985. It was also the band's biggest hit single in Australia, reaching No. 30.

== Background ==
Vocalist and keyboardist Gary Daly wrote "Black Man Ray" at his mother's house following a 1983 tour with Simple Minds. Daly set up a Roland Jupiter-8, a Roland Chorus Echo, a Yamaha Digital Delay pedal, an 808 drum machine, and a TASCAM Portastudio at his mother's house and developed the song independently from Eddie Lundon, who mutually agreed to write songs separately during this period of time. "Black Man Ray" was written the same week as another Daly composition titled "Pipes Of The Man Ray Times", a song that was later included on Daly's 2020 solo album titled Luna Landings, which consisted of archived songs recorded between 1981 and 1987. Daly was more satisfied with "Black Man Ray" and envisioned it as a China Crisis song, although the song still lacked lyrics in its demo form.

When Daly showed a demo of "Black Man Ray" to Walter Becker, Daly felt that it was "as good as any song on the planet! We weren't cocky, it was just confidence in the music and the songs." While the band was recording the song at Parkgate Studio, Becker told Daly that the song reminded him of music from The Beatles. Daly later acknowledged some similarities, saying that "it has that classic Beatles structure of intro, verse, chorus, middle eight, verse, double chorus, out." "Black Man Ray" was originally going to start with a recording of a boy singing the words I'm as glad to be as happy as a king, although the band instead decided to include this snippet on "The Highest High", the opening track on Flaunt the Imperfection.

Daly said the song's title is a word play on both singer Ray Charles and visual artist Man Ray, commenting "It's an intuitive thing, an amalgamation of words and names. I would have been aware of Ray Charles and Man Ray's photography. It's a total Eno-ism, going with the first thing that pops into your head."

Daly commented that "audiences always love to sing along to the chorus. I think that idea of self-doubt, 'Yes, yes, I could be wrong', chimes with a lot of people. It probably came out of me feeling a bit tired and resentful, being on my own and just trying to do the best I can. It has an uplifting tune, but it taps into something deeper."

== Track listing ==
UK 7" single

1. "Black Man Ray" – 3:38
2. "Animalistic" – 4:32

UK 12" single

1. "Black Man Ray" – 3:38
2. "Animalistic" (A Day at the Zoo Mix) – 11:02

UK Limited Edition 12" single

1. "Black Man Ray"
2. "It's Never Too Late"
3. "Animalistic"

UK CD single (1988)

1. "Black Man Ray" – 3:38
2. "Animalistic" (A Day at the Zoo Mix) – 11:02
3. "Hampton Beach" – 4:47

== Chart positions ==
Chart (1985)	Peak position
Australian (Kent Music Report)	30
Canada Top Singles (RPM)	54
Ireland (IRMA)	15
Netherlands (Single Top 100)	36
New Zealand (Recorded Music NZ)	15
UK Singles (OCC)	14
