= African and White =

Single by China Crisis

from the album Difficult Shapes & Passive Rhythms, Some People Think It's Fun to Entertain
- B-side: Be Suspicious (Inevitable); Red Sails (Virgin)
- Released: 25 January 1982; 23 July 1982 (remix)
- Genre: New wave; synth-pop
- Length: 3:46
- Label: Inevitable (1982); Virgin (1982)
- Songwriters: Gary Daly; Eddie Lundon; David Reilly
- Producer: Jeremy Lewis

China Crisis singles chronology
| "African and White" (1982) | "Scream Down at Me" (1982) |

"African and White" is the debut single by the English new wave and synth-pop band China Crisis. Recorded in 1981, it was released on 25 January 1982 by Inevitable Records. A remixed version of the song was reissued as a single by Virgin Records in 1982 and became the band's first appearance on the UK Singles Chart, peaking at number 45 in August 1982. The song is included on the band's debut studio album Difficult Shapes & Passive Rhythms, Some People Think It's Fun to Entertain (1982) and on several compilation albums.

== Critical reception ==
As an independent release, the single, initially released on Liverpool's Inevitable label in early 1982, had limited distribution, although was played by Radio 1's John Peel, which also led the group to getting their first BBC session for the disc jockey (DJ) in March 1982, well before the release of their debut studio album.

Upon its re-release on Virgin Records in a remixed form in August 1982, the single achieved wider distribution and listening audience, meeting with critical acclaim. Smash Hits wrote "intelligent lyrics, an insistent hook and some clever drumming should put it in the mainstream as well as the independent chart." Simon Hills in Record Mirror welcomed the re-release of the "sub-disco record, where insidious guitars lend a distinctive feel that others lack."

Spin retrospectively wrote, "China Crisis showed it could create music that flowed with a strong rhythmic base, most strongly demonstrated on the track "African and White". While China Crisis appeared to be singing about stopping racism, they were perhaps more concerned with stopping musical racism or musical compartmentalization."

== Track listing ==
UK 7" single

1. "African and White"
2. "Be Suspicious"

UK 7" single (reissue, 1982)

1. "African and White" (Remix)
2. "Red Sails"

UK 12" single (reissue, 1982)

1. "African and White" (Remix / Extended Version)
2. "Red Sails"
3. "Be Suspicious"
