= Difficult Shapes & Passive Rhythms, Some People Think It's Fun to Entertain =

Difficult Shapes & Passive Rhythms Some People Think It's Fun to Entertain

Studio album by China Crisis
- Released: 12 November 1982
- Recorded: 1980–82
- Studios: Amazon Studios (Liverpool); Strawberry South (Dorking); Red Bus Studios (London)
- Genres: New wave; synth-pop
- Length: 39:30
- Label: Virgin
- Producers: Peter Walsh; Steve Levine; China Crisis; Gil Norton; Jeremy Lewis

China Crisis chronology
Difficult Shapes & Passive Rhythms Some People Think It's Fun to Entertain (1982)	Working with Fire and Steel – Possible Pop Songs Volume Two (1983)

Singles from Difficult Shapes & Passive Rhythms Some People Think It's Fun to Entertain
- 1. "African and White" Released: 23 July 1982; 2. "No More Blue Horizons" Released: 18 October 1982; 3. "Christian" Released: 3 January 1983

Difficult Shapes & Passive Rhythms Some People Think It's Fun to Entertain is the debut studio album by the English new wave and synth-pop band China Crisis, released on 12 November 1982 by Virgin Records. It spent 17 weeks on the UK Albums Chart and peaked at number 21 in February 1983.

== Recording ==
The album was recorded during a long period of time in different studios with different producers. Half the album that eventually made up side two on the album was recorded on an eight-track studio in Liverpool before China Crisis had signed a recording contract with Virgin Records. "African and White" was produced by Jeremy Lewis. The other half of the album that made up side one was produced by Steve Levine (two tracks) and Peter Walsh (three tracks). Levine, who had recently had success producing Culture Club, was chosen by Virgin Records, but the band did not feel that he was the right choice to produce their songs and was replaced by Walsh who produced three tracks, including "Christian" that went on to become a hit single.

== Critical reception ==
Professional ratings
Review scores
Source	Rating
AllMusic	3/5 stars

Upon its release in 1982, Neil Tennant in Smash Hits gave the album a positive review: "They write pretty melodies (and counter-melodies), intelligent but unobtrusive words, and give their songs delicate, dry arrangements, pulsating with muted rhythms and synthesizer and guitar lines."

In a retrospective AllMusic review Stephen Schnee drew comparisons to OMD, adding that that the duo of Gary Daly and Eddie Lundon "made their fascinating debut, Difficult Shapes & Passive Rhythms, Some People Think It's Fun to Entertain, on a low budget, and their magic was already in place, especially on the Steely Dan-ish 'No More Blue Horizons', the upbeat groove of 'Some People I Know to Lead Fantastic Lives' and 'You Never See It', the gorgeous 'Christian', and their early hit 'African and White'. Their quirkiness doesn't quite translate on a few tracks ('Temptation's Big Blue Eyes' and 'Are We a Worker'), but the charm of this album will win you over if you like smart, yet slightly eccentric, pop songs. It is plainly obvious that, no matter how uncommercial a particular song may be, the boys in China Crisis put their heart and soul into it, creating something uniquely their own, and building upon it."

In a Trouser Press review of the album Jim Green wrote: "The rhythms — R&B, funk, reggae, Afro-gypsy, bossa nova — are so gently, modestly, melodiously proffered that it goes down too smoothly. Then you notice that the dreamily enunciated sentiments interface the political and the personal, with hopeful dreams and admissions of self-doubt and inner struggle. The cohesive feel is maintained despite four different producers; China Crisis' sturdy intellectual backbone emerges often enough to avoid wimpiness."

== Track listing ==
All songs are written by Gary Daly, Eddie Lundon and Dave Reilly.

Side one: Difficult Side

1. "Seven Sports for All" – 3:18
2. "No More Blue Horizons (Fool, Fool, Fool)" – 3:48
3. "Feel to Be Driven Away" – 2:55
4. "Some People I Know to Lead Fantastic Lives" – 3:33
5. "Christian" – 5:37

Side two: Entertainment Side

1. "African and White" – 3:46
2. "Are We a Worker" – 3:30
3. "Red Sails" – 4:43
4. "You Never See It" – 2:57
5. "Temptation's Big Blue Eyes" – 3:25
6. "Jean Walks in Fresh Fields" – 1:53

== Personnel ==
China Crisis

- Gary Daly – vocals; synthesizer; bass on tracks 6, 10
- Eddie Lundon – guitar; vocals; synthesizer on tracks 1, 9 and percussion on tracks 2, 8
- Dave Reilly – drums; percussion; synthesizer on tracks 1, 9

Other personnel

- George McFarlane – bass on track 1
- Pete Walsh – synthesizer (solo) on track 2, electric piano (chord organ) on track 5
- Frank Walsh – trumpet on track 2
- Andy Pask – fretless bass on track 5
- Mike Timoney – synthesizer on track 7
- Jean – vocals on track 7, 10

Production and artwork

- Steve Levine – tracks 1, 3
- Peter Walsh – tracks 2, 4, 5
- Jeremy Lewis – track 6
- Gil Norton and China Crisis – tracks 7–11
- Peter Saville Associates – cover design
