= Kevin Wilkinson =

English drummer (1958–1999)

- Born: Kevin Michael Wilkinson; 11 June 1958; Stoke-on-Trent, Staffordshire, England
- Died: 17 July 1999 (aged 41) Baydon, Wiltshire, England
- Genres: Pop; rock; new wave
- Occupation: Drummer
- Instrument: Drums
- Years active: 1979–1999
- Label: Various

Kevin Michael Wilkinson (11 June 1958 – 17 July 1999) was an English drummer, who was based in Baydon, Wiltshire, England.

== Career ==
Born in Stoke-on-Trent, Staffordshire, Wilkinson is credited as a former official member of several successful British new wave acts, including the League of Gentlemen (1980), the Waterboys (1983–84), China Crisis (1983–89) and Squeeze (1995–96), as well as drummer for Holly Beth Vincent (1981–82). He also appeared in some of his affiliated bands' music videos.

Throughout the course of his career, Wilkinson was a session musician, performing with other artists as diverse as Fish, the Proclaimers and Howard Jones. He was not related to Squeeze's bassist, Keith Wilkinson, although he was briefly a member of Squeeze at the same time as his namesake, and they can be seen in the video for "This Summer".

== Personal life ==
Wilkinson was married to Marilyn Fitzgerald. They had three children.

== Death ==
Wilkinson died by suicide on 17 July 1999, aged 41, by hanging himself in the family home in Baydon, near Swindon.
