= China Crisis =

English new wave and synth-pop band

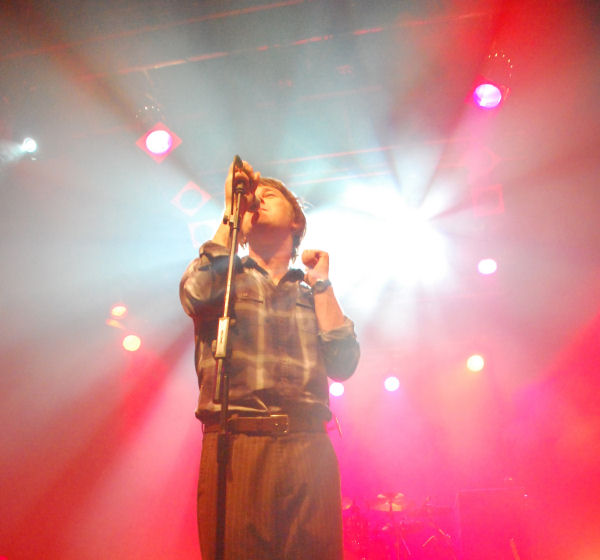
- Gary Daly performing with China Crisis in Birkenhead, Wirral, Merseyside, 2008. Photo: Andrew D. Hurley

Background information
- Origin: Kirkby, Merseyside, England
- Genres: New wave; synth-pop
- Years active: 1979–present
- Labels: Polydor; Virgin; A&M; Secret; Inevitable
- Members: Gary Daly; Eddie Lundon
- Past members: Dave Reilly; Gary "Gazza" Johnson; Kevin Wilkinson; Steve Levy; Gary O'Toole; Walter Becker; Brian McNeill
- Website: chinacrisismusic.com

China Crisis are an English new wave and synth-pop band formed in Kirkby, near Liverpool, Merseyside, in 1979 with a core of lead vocalist/keyboardist Gary Daly and guitarist/vocalist Eddie Lundon. Initially a politically charged post-punk band influenced by Brian Eno's ambient soundscapes, China Crisis soon crossed over to a more commercial sound and had success in the United Kingdom in the 1980s with ten top-50 singles, including the top-10 hit "Wishful Thinking", and three albums charting in or just outside the top 20, including Working with Fire and Steel and the top-10 entry Flaunt the Imperfection, that both received a gold certification.

== History ==
=== Early years and influences ===
Gary Daly (born 10 May 1962, Kirkby, Knowsley, Merseyside) and Eddie Lundon (born 9 June 1962, Kirkby, Knowsley, Merseyside) grew up in working-class families in Kirkby and met at the Roman Catholic St Kevin's School for Boys. Sharing an affection for Steely Dan, David Bowie and Brian Eno, they started playing together in their teens with Lundon on guitar and Daly on bass guitar. They then played with various Knowsley post-punk groups (including different line-ups of the band the Glass Torpedoes) before Daly and Lundon continued on their own. Around 1980 they obtained a synthesizer and a drum machine and began writing songs; contemporary synth-pop acts like Orchestral Manoeuvres in the Dark (OMD) and the Human League were influential on the group's musical trajectory, as were Eno's ambient soundscapes. Initially, Daly and Lundon shared synthesiser duties on the group's albums, but Daly began taking on the majority of synthesiser/keyboard parts as the group's popularity continued to rise.

Daly also cites Talking Heads and post-punk band Magazine as early influences. Eventually joined by drummer and percussionist Dave Reilly, they released their debut single "African and White" as China Crisis on the independent record label Inevitable in 1981. Initially the band's main interest was in studio recording, but they also performed a few live gigs. On 31 December 1981, they performed at the Institute of Contemporary Arts, London along with Haircut One Hundred. In March 1982, they recorded a four-song Peel session for the BBC. In April–May 1982, they played their first UK tour. In June 1982, they backed Tom Verlaine of Television at The Venue in London. In September they performed at the Futurama 4 Festival, followed by a late 1982 UK tour.

=== First successes ===
The band signed a recording contract with Virgin Records in April 1982, and released a single, "Scream Down at Me", in May. A Virgin re-release of "African and White" was their first success, reaching No. 45 in the UK Singles Chart in August, followed by the less successful "No More Blue Horizons (Fool, Fool, Fool)" in October. Recorded over a long period of time with different producers, they released their debut studio album, Difficult Shapes & Passive Rhythms, Some People Think It's Fun to Entertain in November 1982. From it, the single "Christian" made UK No. 12 in early 1983 and brought them to national prominence. By the time of this success, Reilly had left the band, but had remained with the band long enough to co-write and perform on "Christian", along with session musician Steve Levy playing oboe and saxophone. The album peaked at No. 21 in the UK Albums Chart. During this period the band toured supporting Simple Minds on their New Gold Dream tour augmented by Levy and bass guitarist Gary "Gazza" Johnson (born 20 August 1964 died 12 August 2026).

=== Working with Fire and Steel – Possible Pop Songs Volume Two ===
Again backed by Johnson and Levy, along with Waterboys drummer Kevin Wilkinson, the band premiered three new songs in January 1983, including "Wishful Thinking", in a BBC Peel session. Adding Johnson and (eventually) Levy as full members of the line-up, China Crisis recorded a second studio album in Liverpool and at The Manor Studio, Oxfordshire, with producer Mike Howlett and Wilkinson again on drums. Wilkinson himself would become a full-time member of the band the following year, replacing drummer Gary O'Toole, who had initially joined the band around the same time that Levy became an official member and toured with the band in support of the second album for approximately six months before departing. Meanwhile, in May 1983, the single "Tragedy and Mystery" was released and peaked at number 46 on the UK Singles Chart. The arrangement of the song with prominent use of Levy's oboe and flugelhorn marked a noticeable change from the band's previous synth-pop sound.

Preceded by the title track "Working with Fire and Steel", which reached number 48 in the UK, and was a hit on the US Dance Club Songs chart at number 27, the album entitled Working with Fire and Steel – Possible Pop Songs Volume Two, was released in October 1983. The arrival of Steve Levy and Kevin Wilkinson into the band's line-up, along with the introduction of more session musicians, gave the album a markedly less synthetic sound than its predecessor. While the band made use of the then latest technology such as the emulator, they also incorporated brass, woodwind and string instruments to their sound.

In early 1984, the single "Wishful Thinking" peaked at number 9 on the UK Singles Chart, making it their first and only UK top 10 hit single. The song was also a top 10 hit in Ireland, a top 20 hit in several European countries and hit number one on the Swedish radio chart Poporama. In March 1984, the follow-up single "Hanna Hanna" reached number 44 on the UK singles chart.

The album itself was a top 20 success in the UK, also reaching the top 40 in several other countries (including Spain, Australia, Canada, etc.), and China Crisis spent 1984 and 1985 making their biggest chart run. In spring 1984, China Crisis toured Europe on their Working with Fire Steel Tour, followed by touring Europe and North America supporting Simple Minds.

=== Flaunt the Imperfection and mainstream success ===
Their third studio album, Flaunt the Imperfection, was produced by Walter Becker of Steely Dan and reached No. 9 on the UK Albums Chart in May 1985. China Crisis were so honoured to work with Becker that they listed him in the group consisting of Daly, Lundon, Johnson, Wilkinson, and Becker on the album's credits. He never formally appeared with the band (but made important playing contributions on the album) or the subsequent tour featuring new keyboardist Brian McNeill. Johnson was now credited as co-writer with Daly and Lundon.

The album was promoted by the No. 14 UK hit single "Black Man Ray", which also enjoyed critical acclaim and international success, reaching the top 40 in Spain, Australia, New Zealand, Ireland, the Netherlands, etc. The follow-up, "King in a Catholic Style", was a top 20 UK single at No. 19, but it would prove to be the band's last substantial hit. A third release from the album, "You Did Cut Me", stalled at UK No. 54 but reached the top 30 in Ireland and top 10 in Spain. Following their mainstream success, in June 1985 Daly and Lundon fronted the cover of Smash Hits magazine.

The album was followed by a spring 1985 UK tour, performance at the Netherlands Pinkpop Festival in May, six dates in the US and Canada in July–August and further UK dates in October 1985. They also released a video compilation, Showbiz Absurd.

=== What Price Paradise ===
In 1986, the band collaborated with producers Clive Langer and Alan Winstanley (known for their work with Madness) on What Price Paradise, which included "Arizona Sky", the album's first single release and another Australian hit. In addition, "Arizona Sky" achieved stateside success, giving the group a top 40 hit on the US Adult Contemporary chart. All of the band members were now credited as songwriters. A second single from the album, "Best Kept Secret", made UK No. 36 in early 1987. It was to be the band's final top 40 hit single.

The album was followed by China Crisis touring UK and North America in 1987. In summer 1987, they performed at the German Rock am Ring festival, at Stockholm Olympic Stadium, and at the Leysin Festival in Switzerland.

=== Diary of a Hollow Horse ===
The five-piece band worked with Becker once more on 1989's Diary of a Hollow Horse, which earned critical acclaim though little commercial success. It fared slightly better than its predecessor, making the UK top 60, and spawned the singles "St. Saviour Square" and "Red Letter Day", both achieving the lower reaches of the UK Singles Chart. Becker produced most of the album's tracks, but this time was not credited as an official band member.

The album was followed by a May–June UK tour, which was the last performances of the five-piece band and the last China Crisis concerts for over five years.

=== Warped by Success ===
The band's sixth studio album, Warped by Success, was released in 1994, following the band's parting of ways with Virgin Records. The album produced their final studio chart single, "Everyday the Same", which briefly edged into the UK top 100. The band was now once again a duo of Daly and Lundon, although Johnson and Wilkinson were both amongst the session musicians employed in the recording of the album. In 1995, they released a live unplugged album and video entitled Acoustically Yours. This featured a live version of "Black Man Ray", and also saw a brief return for Johnson, McNeill, and Wilkinson.

Since 1992, there have been four compilation albums of their work for the UK and US markets and three live DVDs. The first of these, entitled Collection: The Very Best of China Crisis, made the top 40 on the UK Albums Chart in 1990.

=== 1995–2014: Interim years and reduced activity ===
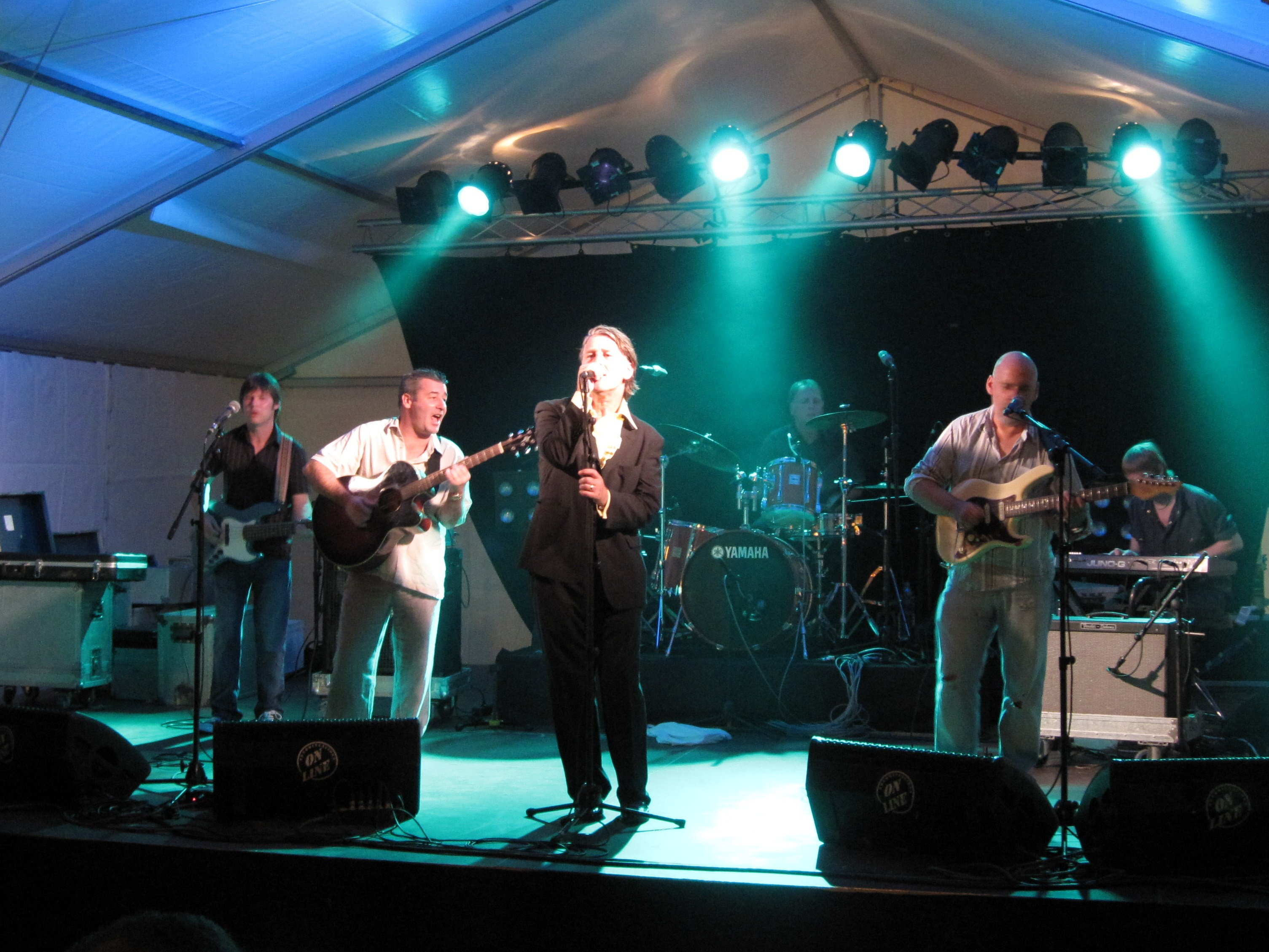
China Crisis performing in Cala Millor, Mallorca 2010.

Since the late 1990s, China Crisis has concentrated on live performances with only original members Eddie Lundon and Gary Daly being constant throughout; the band alternates between performances either as a duo or with a fluctuating line-up of backing musicians.

On 17 July 1999, drummer Kevin Wilkinson died by suicide, hanging himself at the age of 41. Wilkinson had played with a wide variety of other artists including the Waterboys, Fish, the Proclaimers, Squeeze and with Howard Jones. In 2000, Daly contributed a track to a tribute compilation album to Wilkinson, Green Indians.

In December 2002, China Crisis' Daly and Lundon held a one-night unplugged venue in Manila, Philippines, with the support of a local alternative rock band, Rivermaya. They toured the UK during January and February 2007 as part of their 25th anniversary. Daly released his limited edition solo studio album, The Visionary Mindset Experience, in 2007, featuring collaborations with Megan Kovacs of the band Kovacs and Jean Weir.

In 2008, they were the support act for OMD's UK October tour. The following year, the band performed a fund raising gig for The Friends of Meols Park, played at Fort Perch Rock on the Wirral, the Rewind Festival in Henley-on-Thames, and the Mathew Street Festival at Sefton Park in Liverpool.

They returned to the Philippines to perform at Eastwood City in Quezon City on 20 January 2011 and played at the Rewind Festivals in Perth, Scotland and Henley-on-Thames in August 2011. Another concert in the Philippines was held on 9 September 2011 at the SMX Convention Center Manila in Pasay, together with Ex-Simple Minds with further shows in the Philippines, Singapore and Hong Kong that followed. China Crisis' two lead musicians were joined by Siân Monaghan on drums.

Subsequently, the band toured extensively playing dates in the UK (including regular gigs at the Cavern Club, Liverpool) as well as visiting the United States and Canada, and returning to the Philippines.

=== Autumn in the Neighbourhood ===
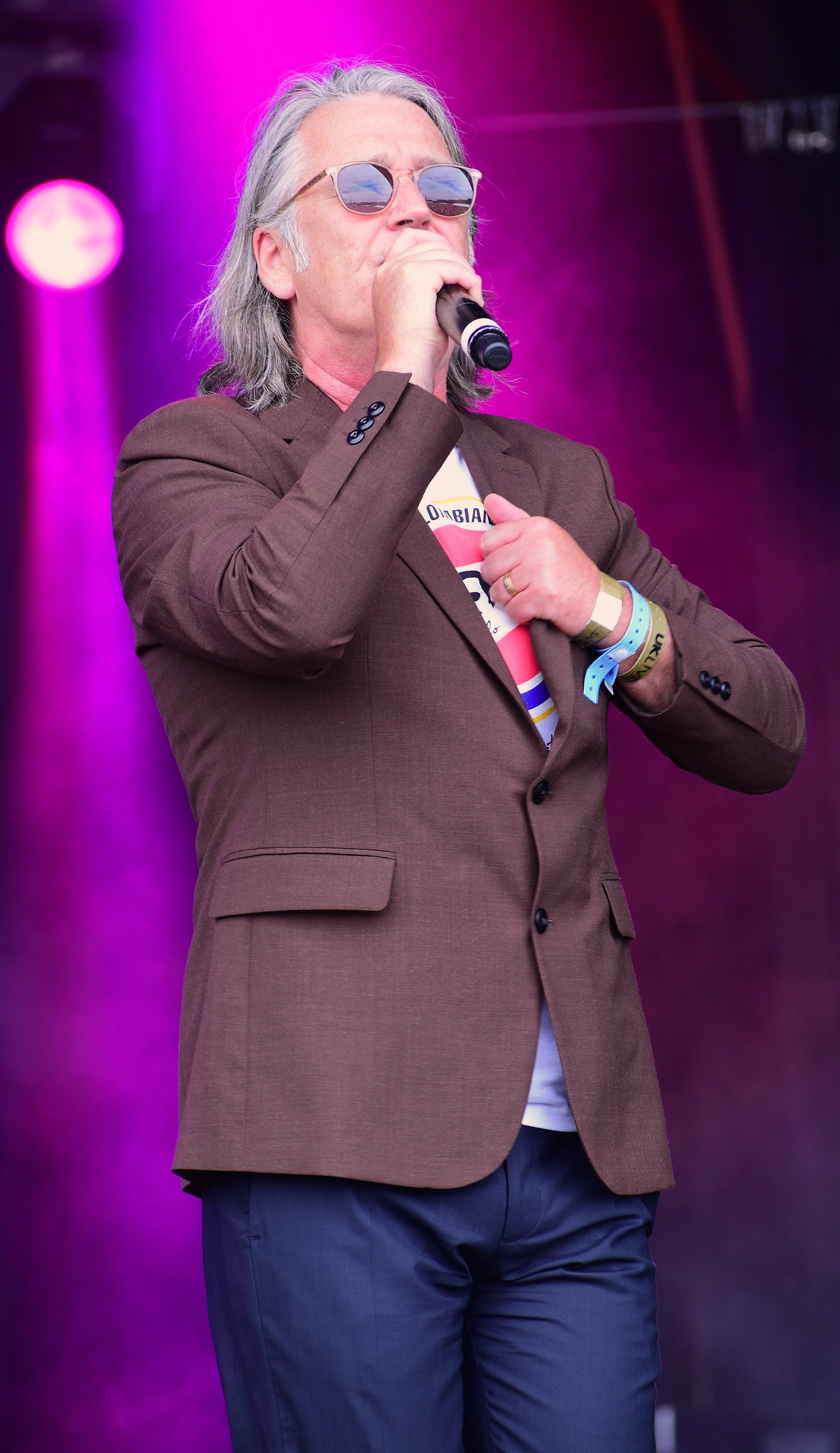
Daly performing with China Crisis at Let's Rock Liverpool in 2021

On 16 December 2013, the song "Everyone You Know" was made available as a free download on the PledgeMusic website, when pre-ordering the band's seventh studio album Autumn in the Neighbourhood announced for release in 2014. On 13 January 2014, the band posted an illustrated account of the track and how it was written and came to be recorded. 87% of the pledge goal had been reached at that time. Ahead of the release of the new album, the track "Being in Love" was premiered on Steve Lamacq's BBC Radio 6 Music show on 25 April 2014. The band toured in late 2014, playing some tracks from the new album alongside older favourites. As of 5 February 2015, the band had achieved 235% of its Pledgemusic target and the album was in final mix and production.

Autumn in the Neighbourhood was released on 3 June 2015 via the PledgeMusic website. It was their first studio album for 21 years, and contained 11 songs; however, the pre-release taster track, "Everyone You Know", was not included on the album. The band undertook an extensive promotional tour of the UK from the end of September until December 2015, both as a trio and as a full band. The tour included a special "Flaunt the Imperfection Live" night at the Epstein Theatre, Liverpool, on 17 October 2015 to mark the thirtieth anniversary of their 1985 studio album of that name. The band also played five nights in North America in December under the banner of "North America Merry Christmas Tour".

In November 2015, a compilation album, 80s Recovered, featuring many 1980s-related artists was released on the Music Brokers label. China Crisis contributed a cover version of Carole King's "It's Too Late", with both a regular version and an extended remix.

=== 2017–present: Later years ===
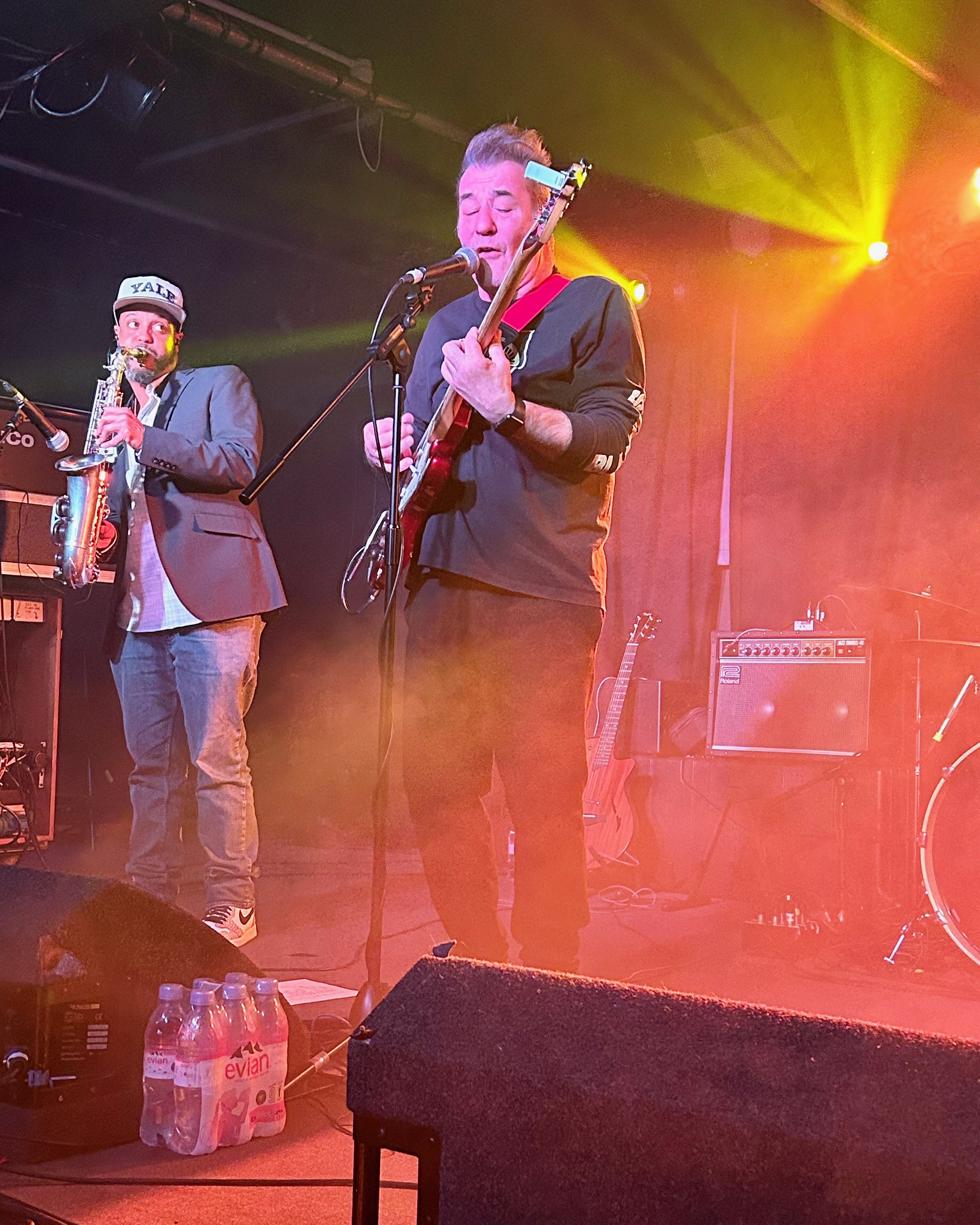
Eddie Lundon performing without Gary Daly at the Manchester Academy 3, due to the latter losing his voice at this concert, April 2023

In March 2017, China Crisis performed as part of an "80s Invasion Tour" that included Toyah, Paul Young and Martika.

In July 2017, the band returned to the Philippines for a show at the Kia Theatre, alongside Peter Coyle of fellow Liverpool band the Lotus Eaters.

Former China Crisis producer and member Walter Becker died on 3 September 2017, at the age of 67.

While China Crisis continue to tour the UK and play live dates, founder member Eddie Lundon taught songwriting at the Liverpool Institute for Performing Arts. Lead vocalist Gary Daly released his solo debut studio album Gone from Here in May 2019. Former China Crisis bassist Gary "Gazza" Johnson and keyboardist Brian McNeill both play on the album. In February 2020, Daly released the solo studio album Luna Landings, a collection of instrumental recordings written between 1981 and 1987.

In 2020, China Crisis were the opening act for Kim Wilde on her Greatest Hits Tour, and they embarked on their own 40th anniversary headlining tour in 2022.

Former band member Gary Johnson died on 12 August 2026, at the age of 68.

== Band members ==
Current

- Gary Daly – vocals; synthesisers (1979–present), bass guitar (1979–1982)
- Eddie Lundon – guitars; vocals (1979–present), synthesiser (1980–1982)

Former (incomplete)

- Dave Reilly – drums; percussion (1981–1982)
- Gary "Gazza" Johnson – bass guitar (1983–1989, 1995; died 2026)
- Kevin Wilkinson – drums; percussion (1983–1989, 1995; died 1999)
- Steve Levy – oboe, saxophone (1983-1984)
- Walter Becker – synthesiser; percussion (1985; died 2017)
- Brian McNeill – synthesisers; vocals (1985–1989, 1995)
- Eric Animan – saxophone
- Jack Hymers – keyboards.

== Discography ==
- Difficult Shapes & Passive Rhythms, Some People Think It's Fun to Entertain (1982)
- Working with Fire and Steel – Possible Pop Songs Volume Two (1983)
- Flaunt the Imperfection (1985)
- What Price Paradise (1986)
- Diary of a Hollow Horse (1989)
- Warped by Success (1994)
- Autumn in the Neighbourhood (2015)
