= Leonard Cohen discography =

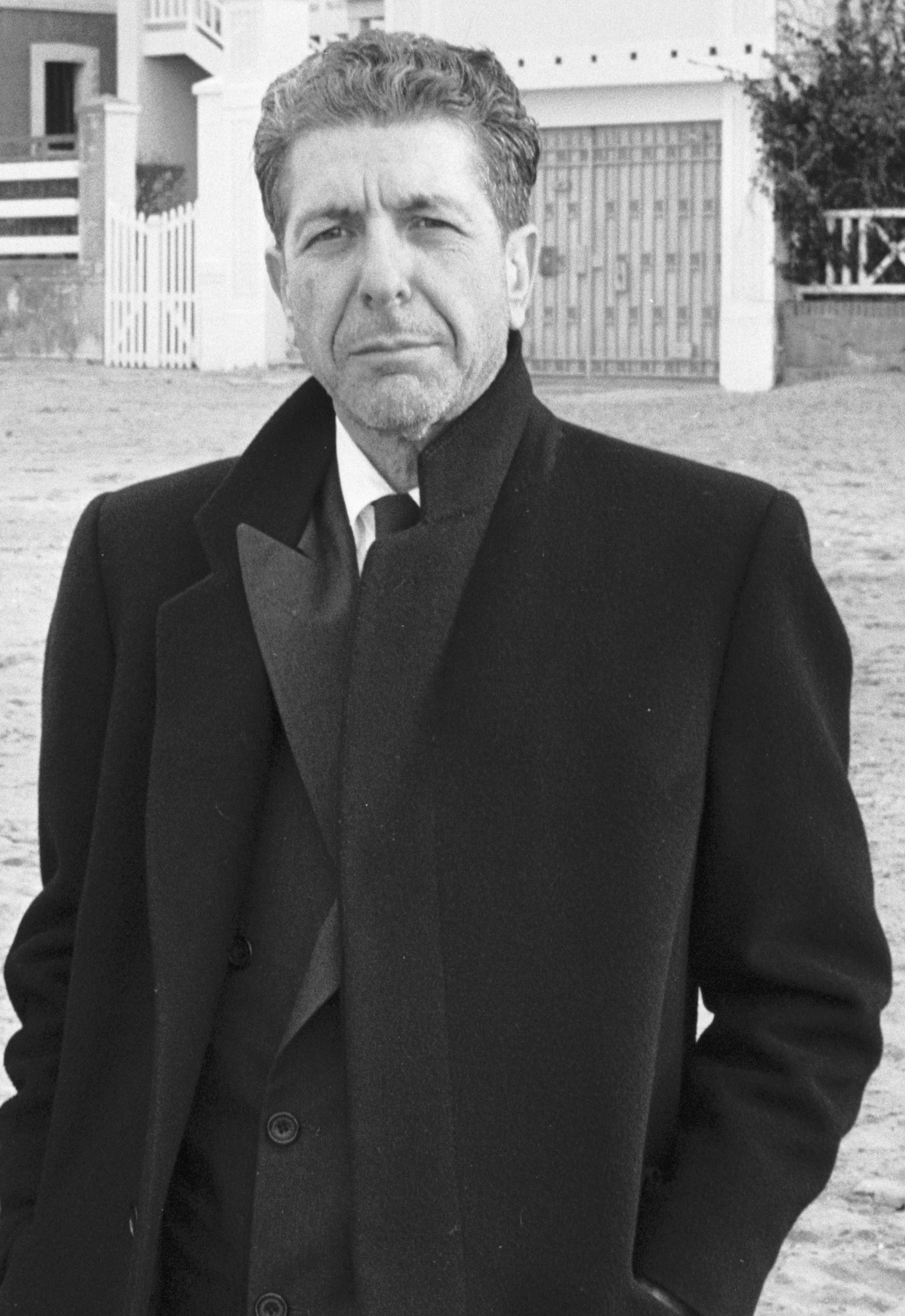
- Leonard Cohen in 1988, around the release of I'm Your Man.
- Studio albums: 15
- Extended plays: 4
- Soundtrack albums: 7
- Live albums: 10
- Compilation albums: 9
- Singles: 41
- Video albums: 12
- Music videos: 32

Leonard Cohen was a Canadian singer-songwriter and poet who was active in music from 1967 until his death in 2016. Cohen released 14 studio albums and eight live albums during the course of a recording career lasting almost 50 years, throughout which he remained an active poet. His entire catalogue is available on Columbia Records. His 1967 debut, Songs of Leonard Cohen, earned an RIAA gold record; he followed up with three more highly acclaimed albums: Songs from a Room (1969), Songs of Love and Hate (1971) and New Skin for the Old Ceremony (1974), before allowing Phil Spector to produce Death of a Ladies' Man for Warner Bros. Records in 1977. Cohen returned to Columbia in 1979 for Recent Songs, but the label declined to release his next album, Various Positions (1984) in the US, leaving it to American shops to import it from CBS Canada. In 1988, Columbia got behind Cohen again and gave full support to I'm Your Man, which brought his career to new heights, and Cohen followed it with 1992's The Future.

Cohen then took a nine-year hiatus, and returned with Ten New Songs in 2001, which he made with Sharon Robinson, following this with Dear Heather (2004). In 2008 Cohen began touring for the first time in 15 years and, as well as the release of several live albums, he released Old Ideas (2012), which peaked at number three on the Billboard 200 albums chart. This was the highest ranking ever for a Leonard Cohen album, and it became his first to top the Canadian Albums Chart, a feat he repeated with his follow-up, Popular Problems, released in 2014. Cohen released his final studio album, You Want It Darker, in October 2016, only 19 days prior to his death. A posthumous album titled Thanks for the Dance was released on November 22, 2019.

His live albums included Live Songs (1973), Cohen Live: Leonard Cohen in Concert (1994), Live in London (2009), Songs from the Road (2010), from his 2008–2009 world tour, and Live at the Isle of Wight 1970 (2009).

== Albums ==
=== Studio albums ===
| Year | Album details | Peak chart positions | | | | | | | | | | | | Certifications |
| Year | Album details | CAN | AUS | AUT | FIN | GER | IRE | NLD | NOR | NZ | SWE | UK | US | Certifications |
|---|---|---|---|---|---|---|---|---|---|---|---|---|---|---|
| 1967 | Songs of Leonard Cohen: Released: December 27, 1967; Label: Columbia | — | 81 | — | — | — | 40 | 4 | 36 | — | 35 | 13 | 83 | RIAA: Gold; ARIA: Platinum; BPI: Gold |
| 1969 | Songs from a Room: Released: March 24, 1969; Label: Columbia | 10 | — | — | — | — | 87 | 12 | — | — | — | 2 | 63 | BPI: Silver |
| 1971 | Songs of Love and Hate: Released: March 19, 1971; Label: Columbia | 63 | 8 | — | — | 24 | — | 2 | 11 | — | — | 4 | 145 | |
| 1974 | New Skin for the Old Ceremony: Released: August 11, 1974; Label: Columbia | — | 86 | 2 | — | 17 | — | 18 | — | — | — | 24 | — | BPI: Silver |
| 1977 | Death of a Ladies' Man: Released: November 13, 1977; Label: Warner/Spector, Columbia | — | 85 | — | — | — | — | — | 20 | — | 15 | 35 | — | |
| 1979 | Recent Songs: Released: September 27, 1979; Label: Columbia | — | — | 24 | — | 56 | — | — | — | — | — | — | — | |
| 1984 | Various Positions: Released: December 11, 1984; Label: Columbia | 60 | 52 | 18 | 2 | 43 | 99 | — | 3 | 33 | 12 | 52 | — | BPI: Silver; IFPI FIN: Gold |
| 1988 | I'm Your Man: Released: February 2, 1988; Label: Columbia | 34 | — | 22 | 2 | 32 | 43 | 16 | 1 | — | 6 | 48 | — | MC: 2× Platinum; ARIA: Gold; BPI: Gold; GLF: Platinum; IFPI FIN: Gold; IFPI NOR: 4× Platinum |
| 1992 | The Future: Released: November 24, 1992; Label: Columbia | 7 | — | 5 | 18 | 79 | — | 56 | 3 | 42 | 5 | 36 | — | MC: 2× Platinum; BPI: Silver; GLF: Gold |
| 2001 | Ten New Songs: Released: October 9, 2001; Label: Columbia | 4 | 67 | 5 | 35 | 16 | 7 | 18 | 1 | — | 3 | 26 | 143 | MC: Platinum; BPI: Gold; GLF: Gold; IFPI NOR: Platinum |
| 2004 | Dear Heather: Released: October 26, 2004; Label: Columbia | 5 | 98 | 13 | 22 | 19 | 5 | 34 | 2 | — | 8 | 34 | 131 | BPI: Silver; IFPI NOR: Gold |
| 2012 | Old Ideas: Released: January 31, 2012; Label: Columbia | 1 | 2 | 2 | 1 | 4 | 2 | 1 | 1 | 1 | 2 | 2 | 3 | MC: Platinum; BPI: Gold; GLF: Gold |
| 2014 | Popular Problems: Released: September 22, 2014; Label: Columbia | 1 | 6 | 1 | 2 | 4 | 2 | 1 | 1 | 1 | 5 | 5 | 15 | MC: Platinum |
| 2016 | You Want It Darker: Released: October 21, 2016; Label: Columbia | 1 | 2 | 1 | 7 | 2 | 1 | 1 | 1 | 1 | 1 | 4 | 7 | MC: Platinum; ARIA: Gold; BPI: Gold; GLF: Gold |
| 2019 | Thanks for the Dance: Released: November 22, 2019; Label: Columbia | 1 | 11 | 2 | 17 | 5 | 6 | 5 | 2 | 4 | 6 | 7 | 61 | |
" — " denotes releases that did not chart.

=== Live albums ===
| Year | Album details | Peak chart positions | | | | | | | | | | | | Certifications |
| Year | Album details | CAN | AUS | AUT | FIN | GER | IRE | NLD | NOR | NZ | SWE | UK | US | Certifications |
|---|---|---|---|---|---|---|---|---|---|---|---|---|---|---|
| 1973 | Live Songs: Release: April 1973; Label: Columbia | — | — | 8 | — | 30 | — | — | — | — | — | — | 156 | |
| 1994 | Cohen Live: Leonard Cohen in Concert: Release: June 28, 1994; Label: Columbia | — | — | — | — | — | — | — | — | — | — | 35 | — | |
| 2001 | Field Commander Cohen: Tour of 1979: Release: February 20, 2001; Label: Columbia | — | — | — | — | — | — | — | — | — | — | 195 | — | |
| 2009 | Live in London: Release: March 31, 2009; Label: Columbia | 7 | 26 | 9 | 7 | 13 | 3 | 7 | 8 | 4 | 14 | 19 | 76 | MC: 3× Platinum; ARIA: Gold; BPI: Gold; BVMI: Gold; IRMA: Gold |
| 2009 | Live at the Isle of Wight 1970: Release: October 19, 2009; Label: Columbia | — | — | — | — | — | 73 | 56 | — | — | — | 169 | — | ARIA: Gold |
| 2010 | Songs from the Road: Release: September 14, 2010; Label: Columbia | 10 | — | 7 | 37 | 36 | — | 26 | 7 | 11 | 39 | 68 | 112 | ARIA: Platinum; BVMI: Gold; MAHASZ: Gold; IRMA: Platinum; ZPAV: Gold; AFP: Platinum |
| 2014 | Live in Dublin: Release: December 2, 2014; Label: Columbia | — | — | 33 | — | 53 | 17 | 19 | — | — | — | 84 | — | |
| 2015 | Can't Forget: A Souvenir of the Grand Tour: Release: May 12, 2015; Label: Sony Legacy | 8 | 39 | 17 | — | 23 | 5 | 4 | — | 29 | 39 | 18 | 100 | |
" — " denotes releases that did not chart.

=== Compilation albums ===
| Year | Album details | Peak chart positions | | | | | | | | | | | | | Certifications |
| Year | Album details | CAN | AUS | AUT | FIN | GER | IRE | NLD | NOR | NZ | SWE | SWI | UK | US | Certifications |
|---|---|---|---|---|---|---|---|---|---|---|---|---|---|---|---|
| 1975 | The Best of Leonard Cohen / Greatest Hits: Label: Columbia; Formats: CD, CS, LP, 8-track | 43 | — | — | — | 43 | — | 86^{[A]} | — | — | — | 41 | 88^{[A]} | — | RIAA: Gold; ARIA: 2× Platinum; BVMI: Gold; BPI: Platinum |
| 1980 | Liebesträume – Leonard Cohen singt seine schönsten Lieder: Released in Germany only; Label: CBS; Format: LP | — | — | — | — | 3 | — | — | — | — | — | — | — | — | |
| 1989 | So Long, Marianne: Label: Columbia Records; Format: CD | — | — | — | — | — | — | — | — | — | — | — | — | — | ARIA: Gold |
| 1997 | More Best of Leonard Cohen: Released: October 7, 1997; Label: Columbia Records; Formats: CD, CS, LP | 33 | — | 41 | 19 | — | — | 69 | 7 | — | 22 | — | 82 | — | ARIA: Gold; RIAA: Gold |
| 2002 | The Essential Leonard Cohen: Released: October 22, 2002; Label: Columbia; Formats: CD, LP | 4 | 9^{[B]} | 14 | 6 | 31 | 5 | 10 | 3 | 29 | 8 | 5 | 26^{[C]} | 13 | ARIA: 2× Platinum; BPI: Platinum; BVMI: Gold; GLF: Gold; IFPI FIN: Gold; IFPI NOR: Platinum; RIAA: Gold |
| 2008 | The Collection: Released: June 27, 2008; Label: Columbia; Format: CD; Box set | — | — | — | 17 | — | — | — | — | — | — | — | — | — | |
| 2009 | Greatest Hits: Released: July 13, 2009; Label: Columbia; Format: CD; Remastered version with new track listing | — | — | 11 | 34 | 51 | 3 | — | — | — | — | 18 | 29 | — | |
| 2011 | The Complete Studio Albums Collection: Released: October 10, 2011; Label: Columbia; Format: CD; Box set | — | — | — | — | 58 | — | 72 | 33 | — | — | — | — | — | |
| 2022 | Hallelujah & Songs From His Albums: Released: October 14, 2022; Label: Sony; Format: CD, digital | — | — | 27 | — | 43 | — | — | — | — | — | 20 | — | — | |
" — " denotes releases that did not chart.

Notes

- A The Best of Leonard Cohen, or Greatest Hits as it was released in Europe, did not chart in the Netherlands and UK when it was released in 1975, but the album did chart when re-issued on CD in 1988–1989. In UK it initially reached a peak at number 99 in 1988 and then at 88 in 1995. In Netherlands it reached number 86 in April 1989.
- B The Essential Leonard Cohen was re-released in 2008 as The Essential Leonard Cohen 3.0, a 3-disc edition which charted in Australia in February 2009.
- C The Essential Leonard Cohen initially peaked at number 70 in 2003. The album re-entered the charts in 2008 at number 57, before peaking at number 26 after Cohen's death in November 2016.

== Singles and EPs ==
| Year | Title | Chart positions | | | | | | | | | | Certifications | Album |
| Year | Title | CAN | CAN AC | AUT | FIN | FRA | GER | NLD | SWE | UK | US | Certifications | Album |
|---|---|---|---|---|---|---|---|---|---|---|---|---|---|
| 1967 | "Suzanne" | — | — | 39 | — | 3 | 61 | 79 | — | — | — | BPI: Silver | Songs of Leonard Cohen |
| 1968 | "So Long, Marianne" / "Hey, That's No Way to Say Goodbye" | — | — | — | — | 28; 190 | — | — | — | — | — | | Songs of Leonard Cohen |
| 1969 | "Bird on the Wire" | — | — | — | — | 137 | — | — | — | — | — | | Songs from a Room |
| 1969 | "The Partisan" | — | — | — | — | 22 | — | — | — | — | — | | Songs from a Room |
| 1971 | "Joan of Arc" | — | — | — | — | — | — | — | — | — | — | | Songs of Love and Hate |
| 1971 | "Diamonds in the Mine" | — | — | — | — | — | — | — | — | — | — | | Songs of Love and Hate |
| 1971 | "Dress Rehearsal Rag" / "Avalanche" | — | — | — | — | — | — | — | — | — | — | | Songs of Love and Hate |
| 1971 | "The Stranger Song" | — | — | — | — | — | — | — | — | — | — | | Songs of Leonard Cohen / McCabe & Mrs. Miller |
| 1971 | "Winter Lady" | — | — | — | — | — | — | — | — | — | — | | Songs of Leonard Cohen / McCabe & Mrs. Miller |
| 1971 | "So Long, Marianne" / "Bird on the Wire" | — | — | — | — | — | — | — | — | — | — | | Songs of Leonard Cohen / Songs from a Room |
| 1973 | "Passing Through" | — | 62 | — | — | — | — | — | — | — | — | | Live Songs |
| 1974 | "Lover Lover Lover" | — | — | — | — | — | 9 | — | — | — | — | | New Skin for the Old Ceremony |
| 1975 | "Tonight Will Be Fine" | — | — | — | — | — | — | — | — | — | — | | Songs from a Room |
| 1976 | "Suzanne" [re-issue] | — | — | — | — | — | — | — | — | — | — | | Greatest Hits |
| 1976 | "Do I Have to Dance All Night" [live] [non-album song] / "The Butcher" [live] | — | — | — | — | — | — | — | — | — | — | | non-album single |
| 1977 | "Memories" | — | — | — | — | — | — | — | — | — | — | | Death of a Ladies' Man |
| 1977 | "True Love Leaves No Traces" | — | — | — | — | — | — | — | — | — | — | | Death of a Ladies' Man |
| 1978 | "Suzanne" / "Bird on the Wire" [re-issue] | — | — | — | — | — | — | — | — | — | — | | Songs of Leonard Cohen/ Songs from a Room |
| 1979 | "The Guests" | — | — | — | — | — | — | — | — | — | — | | Recent Songs |
| 1984 | "Dance Me to the End of Love" | — | 29 | — | 5 | 42 | — | — | — | — | — | | Various Positions |
| 1984 | "Hallelujah" | 17 | — | 13 | — | 1 | 27 | — | — | — | — | BPI: Silver | Various Positions |
| 1986 | "Take This Waltz" [original version] | — | — | — | 6 | — | — | — | — | — | — | | Poets in New York |
| 1988 | "First We Take Manhattan" | — | — | — | — | — | — | — | — | — | — | | I'm Your Man |
| 1988 | "I'm Your Man" | — | — | — | — | 57 | — | — | — | — | — | | I'm Your Man |
| 1988 | "Ain't No Cure for Love" | — | — | — | — | — | — | — | — | — | — | | I'm Your Man |
| 1988 | "Everybody Knows" | — | — | — | — | 88 | — | — | — | — | — | | I'm Your Man |
| 1989 | "I Can't Forget" | — | — | — | — | — | — | — | — | — | — | | I'm Your Man |
| 1991 | Solid Gold EP: "First We Take Manhattan" / "Suzanne" / "So Long, Marianne" | — | — | — | — | — | — | — | — | — | — | | I'm Your Man / Greatest Hits |
| 1991 | 1991 Juno Hall of Fame Award; Commemorative Sampler: "Hallelujah" / "Ain't No Cure for Love" / "Everybody Knows" / "Tower of Song" | — | — | — | — | — | — | — | — | — | — | | Various Positions / I'm Your Man |
| 1992 | "Closing Time" | 70 | 5 | — | — | — | — | — | — | — | — | | The Future |
| 1992 | "Democracy" | — | — | — | — | — | — | — | — | — | — | | The Future |
| 1993 | "The Future" | — | 17 | — | — | — | — | — | — | — | — | | The Future |
| 1993 | "Be for Real" | — | — | — | — | — | — | — | — | — | — | | The Future |
| 1994 | "Dance Me to the End of Love" (live) | — | — | — | — | — | — | — | — | — | — | | Cohen Live: Leonard Cohen in Concert |
| 1997 | "Never Any Good" | — | 44 | — | — | — | — | — | — | — | — | | More Best of Leonard Cohen |
| 2001 | "In My Secret Life" | — | — | — | — | — | — | — | — | — | — | | Ten New Songs |
| 2002 | "Boogie Street" | — | — | — | — | — | — | — | — | — | — | | Ten New Songs |
| 2004 | "The Letters" | — | — | — | — | — | — | — | — | — | — | | Dear Heather |
| 2007 | "So Long, Marianne" / "Bird on the Wire" [re-issue] | — | — | — | — | — | — | — | — | — | — | | Songs of Leonard Cohen / Songs from a Room |
| 2007 | "Hallelujah" [re-issue] | — | — | 67 | — | — | — | 27 | 16^{[D]} | 36^{[E]} | 59^{[G]} | ARIA: Gold | The Essential Leonard Cohen |
| 2009 | "The Future" (live) / "Suzanne" (live) ^{[F]} | — | — | — | — | — | — | — | — | — | — | | Live in London |
| 2011 | "Show Me the Place" | — | — | — | — | — | — | — | — | — | — | | Old Ideas |
| 2012 | "Darkness" | — | — | — | — | — | — | — | — | — | — | | Old Ideas |
| 2012 | Live in Fredericton EP: "Bird on the Wire" / "Dance Me to the End of Love" / "Heart with No Companion" / "In My Secret Life" / "Who by Fire" | — | — | — | — | — | — | — | — | — | — | | Live in Fredericton EP |
| 2016 | "You Want It Darker" | 73 | — | 33 | — | 36 | 81 | 76 | 52 | — | — | | You Want It Darker |
| 2019 | "Happens to the Heart" | — | — | — | — | — | — | — | — | — | — | | Thanks for the Dance |
"—" denotes releases that did not chart.

Notes

- D Leonard Cohen's 1984 track "Hallelujah" charted in Sweden in December 2007 due to download sales. At the same time Jeff Buckley's version also entered the charts, and the week of December 13, 2007, Buckley's version peaked at No. 5 with Cohen's original reaching its peak position No. 16 the same week.
- E Although not explicitly released as a single, Cohen's heavily covered 1984 track "Hallelujah" charted in the United Kingdom in December 2008 at position number 36. This was due to downloads of the track as a result of the publicity created by Alexandra Burke's cover version, which charted at No. 1 at the same time, and a campaign to get Jeff Buckley's version into the charts (which it did, peaking at No. 2 simultaneous to Burke's cover).
- F Record Store Day 2009 (April 18, 2009) exclusive release.
- G "Hallelujah" did not chart in the United States until November 2016, after Cohen's death. It also charted on the Hot Rock Songs chart at No. 20.

== Contributions ==
=== Guest ===
| Year | Song | Album | Artist | Notes |
|---|---|---|---|---|
| 1957 | "Leonard Cohen" | Six Montreal Poets | Various | poetry |
| 1975 | "Passing Through" | Anniversary Special | Earl Scruggs | vocals |
| 1986 | "Joan of Arc" | Famous Blue Raincoat | Jennifer Warnes | vocals |
| 1990 | "Elvis' Rolls Royce" | Are You Okay? | Was (Not Was) | vocals |
| 1993 | "Born to Lose" | Duets | Elton John | vocals |
| 2006 | album | Blue Alert | Anjani | lyricist, producer, arranger |
| 2007 | "The Jungle Line" | River: The Joni Letters | Herbie Hancock | vocals |
| 2008 | "Since You've Asked (Dialogue)" | Born to the Breed: A Tribute to Judy Collins | Various | Dialogue |
| 2018 | "Necropsy of Love" | The Al Purdy Songbook | Various | poetry |

=== Alternative mixes and live version compilations ===
| Year | Song | Album | Notes |
|---|---|---|---|
| 1971 | "Tonight Will Be Fine" | The First Great Rock Festivals of the Seventies: Isle of Wight/Atlanta Pop Festival | live concert version |
| 1974 | "Tonight Will Be Fine"; "Dress Rehearsal Rag"; "Suzanne"; "Stranger Song" | Concert: Canadien - A Ten Part Radio Documentary | live concert versions |
| 1986 | "Take This Waltz" | Poets in New York | alternate take of track from I'm Your Man, based on the poem "Little Viennese Waltz" by Federico García Lorca |
| 1988 | "Tower of Song" | The Prince's Trust Rock Concert 1988 | live concert version |
| 1995 | "Suzanne" | Message To Love: The Isle of Wight Festival 1970 | live concert version from Isle of Wight Festival 1970 |
| 2006 | "Tower of Song" | Leonard Cohen: I'm Your Man | new take of track from I'm Your Man with U2 |

=== Soundtracks ===
| Year | Song | Album | Label |
|---|---|---|---|
| 1971 | "Sisters of Mercy," "Winter Lady," "The Stranger Song" | McCabe & Mrs. Miller 7-inch EP | CBS |
| 1985 | all song lyrics | Night Magic (Original Soundtrack from the Musical Directed by Lewis Furey) | RCA |
| 1990 | "Ain't No Cure for Love" | Love at Large (Original Motion Picture Soundtrack) | Virgin |
| 1994 | "Waiting for the Miracle"; "The Future" | Natural Born Killers (A Soundtrack for an Oliver Stone Film) | Nothing/Interscope |
| 1996 | "Suzanne" | Breaking the Waves (Original Motion Picture Soundtrack) | Pollyanna |
| 2000 | "Waiting for the Miracle" | Wonder Boys (Music from the Motion Picture) | Columbia |
| 2002 | "I'm Your Man" | Secretary (Music from the Motion Picture) | Lions Gate |
| 2002 | "In My Secret Life" | Amnèsia (Original Soundtrack) | Edel |
| 2003 | "A Thousand Kisses Deep" | The Good Thief (Original Soundtrack & Music from the Film) | Island |
| 2004 | "Sisters of Mercy" | Die fetten Jahre sind vorbei (Der Soundtrack Zum Film) | Mute |
| 2004 | "If It Be Your Will" | Non ti muovere (Musiche Originali Di Lucio Godoy) | Capitol |
| 2004 | "The Land of Plenty"; "The Letters" | Land of Plenty (Music from the Motion Picture) | Sony/Reverse Angle/SINE |
| 2006 | "The Old Revolution" | Monkey Warfare (Original Motion Picture Soundtrack) | Self-released |
| 2006 | "Suzanne" | Banda Sonora Original de Salvador Puig Antich | Sony BMG |
| 2009 | "Hallelujah" | Watchmen: Music from the Motion Picture | Reprise |
| 2011 | "Dance Me to the End of Love"; "I'm Your Man" | Barney's Version (Original Soundtrack) | UMG |
| 2011 | "Winter Lady" | The Art of Getting By (Music from the Motion Picture) | Rhino |
| 2014 | "Dance Me to the End of Love" | Rosewater (Original Motion Picture Soundtrack) | Howe |
| 2014 | "Hey, That's No Way to Say Goodbye" | Transparent (Music from the Amazon Original Series) | Amazon |
| 2014 | "Suzanne" | Wild (Original Motion Picture Soundtrack) | Sony/Legacy |
| 2015 | "Nevermind" | True Detective (Music From The HBO Series) | Harvest |
| 2015 | "Everybody Knows" | The Program (Original Motion Picture Soundtrack) | Universal |
| 2016 | "So Long, Marianne" | Pete's Dragon (Original Motion Picture Soundtrack) | Walt Disney |
| 2016 | "Bird on the Wire" | Absolutely Fabulous: The Movie Soundtrack | Warner/Rhino |
| 2016 | "Everybody Knows" | The Infiltrator (Original Motion Picture Soundtrack) | Lakeshore |

=== Film scores with no soundtrack album ===
- Beware of a Holy Whore (1971) - Rainer Werner Fassbinder uses five songs.
- Who's He Anyway (1983) - debut short directed by Alfonso Cuarón.
- Other Tongues (1984) - collaboration with Zone Jaune.
- Both Sides of the Wire (1993) - documentary on Canada's role in World War II.
- Kiss the Sky (1995) - director Roger Young uses seven songs.
- Death of a Ladies' Man (2020) - director Matt Bissonnette uses seven songs.

== Tribute compilations ==
- I'm Your Fan: The Songs Of Leonard Cohen By... 2XLP/CD (Atlantic/Columbia/EastWest/Music on Vinyl) (1991)
- Tower Of Song (The Songs Of Leonard Cohen) (A & M) (1995)
- According To Leonard Cohen (Acordes Con Leonard Cohen) 2XCD + DVD (DiscMedi Blau) (2007)
- Cohen Revisited (A Tribute To Leonard Cohen) (Les Inrockuptibles) (2009)
- The Songs Of Leonard Cohen Covered (Mojo) (2012)
- A Tribute To Leonard Cohen-Songs Of Love And Hate (Les Inrockuptibles) (2014)
- Sincerely, L. Cohen: A Live Celebration Of Leonard Cohen 2XLP (The Royal Potato Family) (2017)
- Hallelujah: Songs Of Leonard Cohen (Ace) (2019)
- Here It Is: A Tribute To Leonard Cohen 2XLP/CD (Blue Note) (2022)
- A Day With Suzanne: A Tribute to Leonard Cohen (Sony) 2022

== Videography ==
=== Concerts ===
- 1970 Live at the Isle of Wight 1970 (Film; DVD/Blu-ray/Streaming 2009)
- 1988 Songs From the Life of Leonard Cohen (TV, VHS, Laserdisc)
- 1993 Una nit a Barcelona (TV)
- 2005 I'm Your Man (Film; Theatrical/DVD 2006; Blu-ray/Streaming 2017)
- 2009 Live in London (DVD/Streaming)
- 2010 Songs from the Road (DVD/Blu-ray/Streaming)
- 2014 Live in Dublin (DVD/Blu-ray/Streaming)

=== Films ===
- 1983 I Am a Hotel (TV; VHS 1984, 1996)

=== Documentaries ===
- 1965 Ladies and Gentlemen... Mr. Leonard Cohen (Film; VHS 1999, 2000; DVD 1999, 2000, 2006; Streaming 2017)
- 1974 Bird on a Wire (Film/TV; DVD 2010, 2016; Streaming/Theatrical 2017)
- 1980 The Song of Leonard Cohen (TV; Theatrical 1990)
- 1997 Spring 96 (TV)
- 1997 Beautiful Losers (TV)
- 2008 Everybody Knows (TV)
- 2010 Leonard Cohen's Lonesome Heroes (DVD/Streaming)
- 2019 Marianne & Leonard: Words of Love (Theatrical/DVD/Streaming)
- 2021 Hallelujah: Leonard Cohen, A Journey, A Song (Film; Theatrical/DVD/Blu-ray/Streaming 2022)

== Music Videos ==
- 1983 Suzanne
- 1984 Hallelujah
- 1984 Dance Me to the End of Love
- 1986 Take This Waltz
- 1988 I'm Your Man
- 1988 First We Take Manhattan
- 1992 Democracy
- 1992 Closing Time
- 1993 The Future
- 2002 In My Secret Life
- 2005 Because Of
- 2017 Leaving the Table
- 2019 The Goal
- 2019 Happens to the Heart
- 2020 Thanks for the Dance
- 2020 The Hills
- 2020 Moving On
- 2021 Puppets
