= The Songs of Leonard Cohen Covered =

Compilation album by various artists
- Released: February 2012
- Genre: Folk rock
- Label: Mojo

The Songs of Leonard Cohen Covered is a tribute album to Leonard Cohen, released in 2012 and consisting mainly of covers of the songs on his album Songs of Leonard Cohen. It was compiled by Mojo magazine, as a part of the magazine's March 2012 issue. The album features contributions by various musicians, including Bill Callahan, Cass McCombs, The Low Anthem, Field Music, Marc Ribot and ex-Fleet Foxes member Father John Misty.

== Track listing ==
1. Field Music – "Suzanne"
2. Emily Barker and The Red Clay Halo – "Master Song"
3. Palace Songs – "Winter Lady"
4. The Miserable Rich – "The Stranger Song"
5. Liz Green – "Sisters of Mercy"
6. Bill Callahan – "So Long, Marianne"
7. Michael Kiwanuka – "Hey, That's No Way to Say Goodbye"
8. The Low Anthem – "Stories of the Street"
9. Cass McCombs – "Teachers"
10. Father John Misty – "One of Us Cannot Be Wrong"

Bonus tracks

11. Diagrams – "Famous Blue Raincoat"
12. Paper Dollhouse – "Last Year's Man"
13. Marc Ribot and My Brightest Diamond – "Bird on A Wire"
14. Dan Michaelson – "Avalanche"
15. Scott Matthews – "Seems So Long Ago, Nancy"

== Personnel ==
Additional musicians

- Brian Beattie – bass guitar (6)
- Dony Wynn – drums (6)
- Matt Kinsey – electric guitar (6)
- Gary Newcomb – lap steel guitar (6)
- John Perreira – electric guitar (9)
- John Webster Johns – electric guitar, production (9)
