= The Essential Leonard Cohen =

Greatest hits album by Leonard Cohen
- Released: October 22, 2002
- Recorded: 1967–2004
- Genre: Folk rock
- Length: 2:34:10
- Labels: Columbia; Legacy
- Producers: Digitally remastered by Leonard Cohen and Bob Ludwig

Leonard Cohen chronology
Ten New Songs (2001)	The Essential Leonard Cohen (2002)	Dear Heather (2004)

Professional ratings
Review scores
Source	Rating
AllMusic	4.5/5 stars
Robert Christgau	A
Rolling Stone	5/5 stars

The Essential Leonard Cohen is a career-spanning collection of Leonard Cohen songs released in 2002. It is part of Sony's The Essential series.

The songs are arranged in chronological order; all studio albums released before 2002 are represented, except the 1977 album Death of a Ladies' Man. All tracks were digitally remastered by Leonard Cohen and Bob Ludwig. All songs on the compilation were chosen by Cohen himself.

The album was re-released in August 2008 with an extra disc of previously not included tracks (presented as the selection of "fans' favorite" songs).

== Track listing ==
Disc one
No.	Title	Length
1.	"Suzanne"	3:47
2.	"The Stranger Song"	4:59
3.	"Sisters Of Mercy"	3:33
4.	"Hey, That's No Way to Say Goodbye"	2:54
5.	"So Long, Marianne"	5:37
6.	"Bird on the Wire" (misspelled as "Bird on a Wire" on tracklist)	3:25
7.	"The Partisan"	3:25
8.	"Famous Blue Raincoat"	5:07
9.	"Chelsea Hotel #2"	3:05
10.	"Take This Longing"	4:05
11.	"Who By Fire"	2:33
12.	"The Guests"	6:39
13.	"Hallelujah"	4:39
14.	"If It Be Your Will"	3:42
15.	"Night Comes On"	4:39
16.	"I'm Your Man"	4:26
17.	"Everybody Knows"	5:34
18.	"Tower of Song"	5:37

Notes

- Tracks 1–5 are from Songs of Leonard Cohen (1967)
- Tracks 6–7 are from Songs from a Room (1969)
- Track 8 is from Songs of Love and Hate (1971)
- Tracks 9–11 are from New Skin for the Old Ceremony (1974)
- Track 12 is from Recent Songs (1979)
- Tracks 13–15 are from Various Positions (1984)
- Tracks 16–18 are from I'm Your Man (1988)

Disc two
No.	Title	Length
1.	"Ain't No Cure For Love"	4:49
2.	"Take This Waltz"	5:58
3.	"First We Take Manhattan"	5:50
4.	"Dance Me to the End of Love" (live)	6:04
5.	"The Future"	6:41
6.	"Democracy"	7:13
7.	"Waiting For The Miracle"	7:42
8.	"Closing Time"	5:58
9.	"Anthem"	6:06
10.	"In My Secret Life"	4:53
11.	"Alexandra Leaving"	5:22
12.	"A Thousand Kisses Deep"	6:26
13.	"Love Itself"	5:22

Notes

- Tracks 1–3 are from I'm Your Man (1988)
- Track 4 is from Cohen Live (1994)
- Tracks 5–9 are from The Future (1992)
- Tracks 10–13 are from Ten New Songs (2001)

Disc three (The Essential 3.0)
No.	Title	Length
1.	"Seems So Long Ago, Nancy"	3:39
2.	"Love Calls You By Name"	5:38
3.	"A Singer Must Die"	3:17
4.	"Death Of A Ladies' Man"	9:19
5.	"The Traitor"	6:14
6.	"By The Rivers Dark"	5:20
7.	"The Letters"	4:48

Notes

Track 1 is from Songs from a Room

Track 2 is from Songs of Love and Hate

Track 3 is from New Skin for the Old Ceremony

Track 4 is from Death of a Ladies' Man

Track 5 is from Recent Songs

Track 6 is from Ten New Songs

Track 7 is from Dear Heather

== Charts ==
=== Weekly charts ===
Chart (2002)	Peak position
Finnish Albums (Suomen virallinen lista)	6
German Albums (Offizielle Top 100)	76
Norwegian Albums (VG-lista)	3
Polish Albums (ZPAV)	8
Swedish Albums (Sverigetopplistan)	8
Swiss Albums (Schweizer Hitparade)	98

Chart (2008)	Peak position
Austrian Albums (Ö3 Austria)	23
Dutch Albums (Album Top 100)	10

Chart (2009)	Peak position
Australian Albums (ARIA) The Essential 3.0	9
Czech Albums (ČNS IFPI)	10
Hungarian Albums (MAHASZ)	17
Spanish Albums (Promusicae)	51

Chart (2016)	Peak position
French Albums (SNEP)	28
New Zealand Albums (RMNZ) The Essential 3.0	5
Portuguese Albums (AFP)	8
Scottish Albums (Official Charts)	26
Swiss Albums (Schweizer Hitparade)	5
UK Albums (Official Charts)	26
US Billboard 200	13

Chart (2018)	Peak position
Polish Albums (ZPAV)	2

Chart (2019)	Peak position
Polish Albums (ZPAV)	1

Chart (2025)	Peak position
Greek Albums (IFPI)	40

=== Year-end charts ===
Chart (2002)	Position
Swedish Albums (Sverigetopplistan)	51
Chart (2008)	Position
Dutch Albums (Album Top 100)	96
Chart (2009)	Position
Australian Albums (ARIA); The Essential 3.0	87
Chart (2019)	Position
Polish Albums (ZPAV)	33

== Certifications ==
Region	Certification	Certified units/sales
Australia (ARIA)	2× Platinum	140,000^{^}
Finland (Musiikkituottajat)	Gold	17,896
Germany (BVMI)	Gold	150,000^{‡}
Italy (FIMI)	Gold	25,000^{*}
New Zealand (RMNZ)	Platinum	15,000^{^}
Norway (IFPI Norway)	Platinum	47,000
Poland (ZPAV)	Platinum	20,000^{‡}
Sweden (GLF)	Gold	30,000^{^}
United Kingdom (BPI)	Platinum	235,749
United States (RIAA)	Gold	500,000^{^}
^{*} Sales figures based on certification alone.^{^} Shipments figures based on certification alone.^{‡} Sales+streaming figures based on certification alone.
