= Songs from the Road (Leonard Cohen album) =

Live album by Leonard Cohen
- Released: September 14, 2010
- Recorded: October 10, 2008–September 24, 2009
- Genre: Folk
- Length: 66:54
- Label: Columbia; Legacy

Leonard Cohen chronology
Live at the Isle of Wight 1970 (2009)	Songs from the Road (2010)	Old Ideas (2012)

Songs from the Road is a live album by Canadian singer-songwriter Leonard Cohen. Released on September 14, 2010, it is his twentieth album.

== Overview ==
Songs From the Road appeared roughly 18 months after releasing Live in London, which preserved Cohen's July 2008 performance at London's O2 Arena. This album features 12 performances from his 2008 and 2009 concert dates, and while this album isn't a collection of rarities, it does feature a number of lesser-known songs (such as "Heart with No Companion" and "That Don't Make It Junk") and variant versions of some of his more famous (Cohen juggles the order of the verses on "Suzanne" and adds a new verse to "Bird on a Wire"). The selections were culled from a wide variety of locations, including Tel Aviv, Scotland, Finland, and Cohen's native Canada.

== Reception ==
Professional ratings
Review scores
Source	Rating
AllMusic	3.5/5 stars
American Songwriter	3.5/5 stars
BBC	(favorable)
Mojo	4/5 stars
PopMatters	8/10 stars
Uncut	3/5 stars

Songs from the Road elicited mixed reactions from critics. In his review for AllMusic, Mark Deming writes: "While Live in London was a richly satisfying souvenir of Cohen's inspired comeback shows, Songs from the Road is less impressive in its more modest scale and less cohesive atmosphere. But the album still demonstrates that Cohen is a compelling and absorbing performer who brings his soul into every verse he sings, and his band is nothing less that [sic] superb …"

Robert Christgau, who considered Live in London "pretty close" to a career testament, called Songs from the Road "prunelike" and wrote that on the release "many titles are a touch less than prime", but he later noted that, like the other releases from the last stretch of Cohen's career, it was produced "without slackening his lifelong perfectionism".

== Track listing ==
All tracks are written by Leonard Cohen, except where noted.

No.	Title	Writer(s)	Recorded	Length
1.	"Lover, Lover, Lover" (from New Skin for the Old Ceremony)		Sept 24, 2009; Ramat Gan Stadium, Tel Aviv, Israel	7:42
2.	"Bird on the Wire" (from Songs From a Room)		Nov 6, 2008; Clyde Auditorium, Glasgow, Scotland	6:07
3.	"Chelsea Hotel" (from New Skin for the Old Ceremony)		Nov 17, 2008; Royal Albert Hall, London, England	3:30
4.	"Heart with No Companion" (from Various Positions)		Nov 2, 2008; König Pilsener Arena, Oberhausen, Germany	5:05
5.	"That Don't Make It Junk" (from Ten New Songs)	Cohen, Sharon Robinson	Nov 13, 2008; O2 Arena, London, England	4:21
6.	"Waiting for the Miracle" (from The Future)	Cohen, Sharon Robinson	Nov 13, 2009; HP Pavilion, San Jose, California	7:59
7.	"Avalanche" (from Songs of Love and Hate)		Oct 12, 2008; Scandinavium, Gothenburg, Sweden	4:16
8.	"Suzanne" (from Songs of Leonard Cohen)		Nov 30, 2008; MEN Arena, Manchester, England	3:40
9.	"The Partisan" (from Songs From a Room)	Hy Zaret, Anna Marly	Oct 10, 2008; Hartwall Areena, Helsinki, Finland	5:17
10.	"Famous Blue Raincoat" (from Songs of Love and Hate)		Nov 13, 2008; O2 Arena, London, England	5:22
11.	"Hallelujah" (from Various Positions)		April 17, 2009; Coachella Music Festival, Indio, California	7:30
12.	"Closing Time" (from The Future)		May 24, 2009; John Labatt Centre, London, Ontario, Canada	6:05

== Musicians ==
- Leonard Cohen – lead vocal, guitar and keyboard
- Bob Metzger – lead guitar, pedal steel guitar and background vocal
- Javier Mas – 12-string guitar, bandurria, laud, archilaud
- Roscoe Beck – musical director, electric bass guitar, stand-up bass and background vocal
- Dino Soldo – keyboard, wind instruments, harmonica and background vocal
- Neil Larsen – keyboards
- Rafael Bernardo Gayol – drums and percussion
- Sharon Robinson – background vocal
- The Webb Sisters:
  - Charley Webb – background vocal and guitar
  - Hattie Webb – background vocal and harp

== Charts ==
=== Album ===
Chart (2010)	Peak position
Austrian Albums (Ö3 Austria)	7
Belgian Albums (Ultratop Flanders)	5
Belgian Albums (Ultratop Wallonia)	19
Canadian Albums (Billboard)	10
Croatian International Albums (HDU)	3
Czech Albums (ČNS IFPI)	8
Danish Albums (Hitlisten)	23
Dutch Albums (Album Top 100)	26
European Albums (Billboard)	18
French Albums (SNEP)	35
German Albums (Offizielle Top 100)	36
Greek Albums (IFPI)	24
Hungarian Albums (MAHASZ)	8
New Zealand Albums (RMNZ)	11
Norwegian Albums (VG-lista)	7
Polish Albums (ZPAV)	1
Portuguese Albums (AFP)	4
Scottish Albums (OCC)	65
Spanish Albums (Promusicae)	15
Swedish Albums (Sverigetopplistan)	39
Swiss Albums (Schweizer Hitparade)	29
UK Albums (OCC)	68
US Billboard 200	112
US Americana/Folk Albums (Billboard)	3
US Top Rock Albums (Billboard)	43

Chart (2011)	Peak position
Finnish Albums (Suomen virallinen lista)	37

=== Video ===
Chart (2010)	Peak position
Australian Music DVDs (ARIA)	1
Austrian Music DVDs (Ö3 Austria)	3
Belgian Music DVDs (Ultratop Flanders)	5
Belgian Music DVDs (Ultratop Wallonia)	3
Danish Music DVDs (Hitlisten)	3
Finnish Music DVDs (Musiikkituottajat)	10
Irish Music DVDs (IRMA)	1
New Zealand Music DVDs (RIANZ)	3
Swedish Music DVDs (Sverigetopplistan)	2
UK Music Videos (Official Charts Company)	7

== Certifications ==
CD
Region	Certification	Certified units/sales
Germany (BVMI)	Gold	100,000^{‡}
Hungary (MAHASZ)	Gold	3,000^{^}
Ireland (IRMA)	Platinum	4,000^{^}
Poland (ZPAV)	Gold	10,000^{*}
Portugal (AFP)	Platinum	20,000^{^}
^{*} Sales figures based on certification alone.^{^} Shipments figures based on certification alone.^{‡} Sales+streaming figures based on certification alone.

DVD
Region	Certification	Certified units/sales
Australia (ARIA)	Platinum	15,000^{^}
^{^} Shipments figures based on certification alone.
