= The Best of Leonard Cohen =

Greatest hits album by Leonard Cohen
- Released: January 1, 1975
- Recorded: 1967–1974
- Genre: Contemporary folk
- Length: 46:45
- Label: Columbia
- Producers: Bob Johnston, John Lissauer, John Simon

2009 re-release cover

Professional ratings
Review scores
Source	Rating
AllMusic	5/5 stars

The Best of Leonard Cohen is a greatest hits album by Leonard Cohen, released in 1975. In some European countries, it was released under the title Greatest Hits. This alternative title was used for the original vinyl release and for CD reissues from the 1980s onwards.

== Background ==
According to Ira Nadel's 1996 Cohen memoir Various Positions, Cohen agreed to the project because there was a new generation of listeners and he was given complete artistic control; he picked the songs, designed the package, and insisted that the lyrics be included. The album was not a hit in the United States but did well in Europe, Cohen's major market at the time. He toured in support of the album in 1976, beginning in Berlin on April 22 and ending in London on July 7. It was during this tour that Cohen recorded the funky, disco-infused "Do I Have To Dance All Night" at Musicland Studios. The single was only released in Europe.

== Artwork ==
The front cover photograph was taken in 1968 in a Milan hotel room by a Gino, according to Cohen's liner notes. Alternative rock band Ween based the album cover for their 1991 album, The Pod, on this photograph.

== 2009 release ==
In July 2009, this compilation was re-released in England under the title Greatest Hits with updated artwork and a revised track listing. Four tracks from the original 1975 version ("Lady Midnight", "The Partisan", "Last Year's Man" and "Take This Longing") were removed and nine tracks released after 1975 ("Everybody Knows", "Waiting for the Miracle", "A Thousand Kisses Deep", "The Future", "Closing Time", "Dance Me to the End of Love", "First We Take Manhattan", "I'm Your Man" and "Hallelujah") were added.

== Track listings ==
=== 1975 release ===
Side one
No.	Title	Original release	Length
1.	"Suzanne"	Songs of Leonard Cohen, 1967	3:47
2.	"Sisters of Mercy"	Songs of Leonard Cohen	3:33
3.	"So Long, Marianne"	Songs of Leonard Cohen	5:37
4.	"Bird on the Wire"	Songs from a Room, 1969	3:24
5.	"Lady Midnight"	Songs from a Room	2:56
6.	"The Partisan"	Songs from a Room	3:23

Side two
No.	Title	Original release	Length
7.	"Hey, That's No Way to Say Goodbye"	Songs of Leonard Cohen	2:54
8.	"Famous Blue Raincoat"	Songs of Love and Hate, 1971	5:07
9.	"Last Year's Man"	Songs of Love and Hate	5:57
10.	"Chelsea Hotel No. 2"	New Skin for the Old Ceremony, 1974	3:04
11.	"Who by Fire"	New Skin for the Old Ceremony	2:31
12.	"Take This Longing"	New Skin for the Old Ceremony	4:05

=== 2009 release ===
No.	Title	Length
1.	"Suzanne"	3:49
2.	"So Long Marianne"	5:39
3.	"Sisters Of Mercy"	3:35
4.	"Famous Blue Raincoat"	5:09
5.	"Everybody Knows"	5:36
6.	"Waiting For The Miracle"	3:23
7.	"Who By Fire"	2:35
8.	"Chelsea Hotel No. 2"	3:07
9.	"Hey, That's No Way to Say Goodbye"	2:56
10.	"Bird on the Wire"	3:27
11.	"A Thousand Kisses Deep"	6:28
12.	"The Future"	6:43
13.	"Closing Time"	6:00
14.	"Dance Me to the End of Love"	4:40
15.	"First We Take Manhattan"	5:53
16.	"I'm Your Man"	4:26
17.	"Hallelujah"	4:38

== Charts ==
=== Weekly charts ===
Chart (2009)	Peak position
Hungarian Albums (MAHASZ)	1

=== Year-end charts ===
2002 year-end chart performance for The Best of Leonard Cohen
Chart (2002)	Position
Canadian Alternative Albums (Nielsen SoundScan)	82

== Certifications and sales ==
Region	Certification	Certified units/sales
Australia (ARIA)	2× Platinum	140,000^{^}
France (SNEP)	Platinum	300,000^{*}
Germany (BVMI)	2× Platinum	1,000,000^{‡}
Hungary (MAHASZ)	Gold	3,000^{^}
Switzerland (IFPI Switzerland)	Gold	25,000^{^}
United Kingdom (BPI)	Platinum	300,000^{*}
United States (RIAA)	Gold	500,000^{^}
^{*} Sales figures based on certification alone.^{^} Shipments figures based on certification alone.^{‡} Sales+streaming figures based on certification alone.
