= Live Songs =

Live album by Leonard Cohen
- Released: April 1973
- Recorded: 1970, 1972
- Genre: Contemporary folk
- Length: 49:10
- Label: Columbia
- Producer: Bob Johnston

Leonard Cohen chronology
Songs of Love and Hate (1971)	Live Songs (1973)	New Skin for the Old Ceremony (1974)

Singles from Live Songs
- 1. "Passing Thru" Released: April 1973

Live Songs, recorded in 1970 and 1972, released in 1973, during the three-year silence between Songs of Love and Hate and New Skin for the Old Ceremony, is Leonard Cohen's first officially released live album; though Live at the Isle of Wight 1970 had been recorded in 1970, that album was not released until 2009.

== Background ==
It was not until after the release of Cohen's second album, Songs From a Room in 1969, that the singer reluctantly agreed to tour. As recounted in Ira Nadel's 1996 biography Various Positions, Cohen's first major singing appearance at a Town Hall rally in New York City for the National Committee for a Sane Nuclear Policy in April, 1967 had not gone well; he played a few bars of "Suzanne" and walked off, stricken with stage fright, only to be coaxed back on stage to finish the song by a sympathetic audience. Cohen finally bowed to the pressure to tour in 1970 but restricted himself to Europe, where his popularity was much higher than in the United States. Cohen would return to Europe again in 1972 and 1974. According to Anthony Reynolds book Leonard Cohen: A Remarkable Life, Cohen asked Bob Johnston, who had produced Songs From a Room, to assemble the band and play keyboards on the tour: "I ended up on the tour almost by accident," Reynolds quotes Johnston. "He asked me to manage him; then he asked me to get his band together. Getting ready, I had said to Cohen, 'Man, I'll get you the best piano player in the world.' 'No, I want you,' Leonard insisted. I protested: 'I can't play piano. I can bang around, but I can't play, and you've got great musicians here. They're wonderful people.' 'Either you come and play, or I won't go' was Cohen's response. I thought, 'Hell, I'm not gonna miss this.' So we started off. I just played piano and guitar and organ, whatever. I couldn't play very well, but he couldn't sing very well."

Cohen is backed by a medium-sized, country-influenced group nicknamed The Army, which includes guitarist Ron Cornelius, guitarist/fiddler Charlie Daniels and vocalist "Jennifer Warren", who would soon become famous as Jennifer Warnes and a popular interpreter of Cohen's songs. Speaking to Mojo in November 2001, Cohen said of the female singers that supported him in concert, "I need them. I think my voice sounds better when I am somewhat obscured with the sounds of people who can actually sing. I have never had much competence. Personally when I listen to my songs, I'm always more comfortable when my voice is surrounded by harmonies, which to me would naturally suggest the female voice. I need to hear harmonies so that I can just find the pitch." In 2009, Cohen explained further during an interview on the CBC Radio show Q: "I was very much influenced by women's background voices...I like those songs that had that feel. Those are the songs of the fifties. So those were the sounds I wanted to try to reproduce. Also, my own voice sounded so disagreeable to me when I listened to it that I really needed the sweetening of women's voices behind me."

== Recording and composition ==
Only two songs from his 1970 tour are featured, including the 13-minute "Please Don't Pass Me By (A Disgrace)," which was recorded in London, and "Tonight Will Be Fine," which Cohen sang at the Isle of Wight. The latter was performed in front of 600,000 people under trying circumstances; Cohen was awoken at 4 am in his trailer and took the stage in his pajamas (which were hidden beneath a raincoat) to face an unruly, largely stoned audience that had just watched Jimi Hendrix perform and had been sitting in their own squalor for several days. Cohen's mystical performance, which is now considered one of the highlights of the show, calmed the crowd, with Bob Johnston marveling later on the Leonard Cohen Live at the Isle of Wight 1970 DVD, "I think Leonard is probably the best performer in the world. I never saw anybody that did what he did...It was a whole festival with 600,000 people there and he took it over, he captured it the last night there."

The album consists mostly of reinterpretations of songs (often with additional or significantly altered lyrics) from Cohen's second LP Songs From a Room taken from the 1972 European tour. At the beginning of a Paris, France performance of "Bird on the Wire", Cohen recites the first verse of a French translation of the song's lyric. "Nancy" is a version of "Seems So Long Ago, Nancy", while "Improvisation" is an extended instrumental guitar trio version of the vamp from "You Know Who I Am", which is also featured. The other tracks are a cover of the folk standard "Passing Through", and "Minute Prologue". A "bonus" track, "Queen Victoria", was recorded by Cohen alone in his Tennessee hotel room in 1972 with lyrics adapted from "Queen Victoria and Me", from his 1964 poetry collection Flowers for Hitler. Neither Songs of Leonard Cohen nor the then-recent Songs of Love and Hate (which featured a live track, "Let's Sing Another Song, Boys", culled from the Isle of Wight performance) are represented. The 1972 European tour, from which most of the selections on Live Songs are taken, is covered extensively in the 1974 Tony Palmer documentary Bird on a Wire.

The album cover features an unsmiling Cohen staring icily at the camera. The liner notes were composed by the little-known (and often institutionalized) artist and poet Daphne Richardson. Two months before the album's release, Cohen, who had been grappling with depression at the time, told Roy Hollingworth from Melody Maker, "I just cannot stand to remain part of the music business. I've reached a state when I'm just not writing anything." In March 1975 he would explain to Harvey Kubernik of Melody Maker, "The previous album Live Songs represented a very confused and directionless time. The thing I like about it is that it documents this phase very clearly."

== Reception ==
Professional ratings
Review scores
Source	Rating
AllMusic	4/5 stars
Christgau's Record Guide	B+
Uncut	3/5 stars

Live Songs was released in April 1973 and was a commercial disappointment. It would be the last Cohen LP to make the U.S. charts for more than a decade. In the book Various Positions, Cohen biographer Ira Nadel deemed Live Songs "uneven but spontaneous. The mood was somber, the songs full of darkness, and the cover photo haunting...Reaction to the album was negative." Gautam Baksi of AllMusic calls the collection "an integral part of the early Cohen chronicles," adding, "The release includes several new songs...all of which skillfully combine heavy doses of erotica, love, and depression."

== Track listing ==
- All songs written by Leonard Cohen except as noted.
- All recorded in 1972 except as noted.

Side 1

1. "Minute Prologue" – 1:12 (London)
2. "Passing Through" – 4:05 (by Dick Blakeslee, arranged by Cohen) (London)
3. "You Know Who I Am" – 5:22 (Brussels)
4. "Bird on the Wire" – 4:27 (Paris)
5. "Seems So Long Ago, Nancy" – 3:48 (London)
6. "Improvisation" – 3:17 (Paris)

Side 2

1. "Story of Isaac" – 3:56 (Berlin)
2. "Please Don't Pass Me By (A Disgrace)" – 13:00 (London, 1970)
3. "Tonight Will Be Fine" – 6:06 (Isle of Wight, 1970)
4. "Queen Victoria" – 3:28 (Tennessee)

== Personnel ==
- Leonard Cohen : Vocals, acoustic guitar,
- David O'Connor : acoustic guitar
- Ron Cornelius : acoustic and electric guitars
- Elkin Fowler : Guitar, banjo
- Bob Johnston : Guitar, harmonica, organ
- Charlie Daniels : Bass, violin
- Peter Marshall : Double bass, electric bass
- Aileen Fowler, Corlynn Hanney, Donna Washburn, Jennifer Warren : Backing vocals
