= So Long, Marianne (album) =

Compilation album by Leonard Cohen
- Released: 1989
- Recorded: 1968–1974
- Genre: Folk music, singer-songwriter
- Length: 41:42
- Label: Columbia
- Producer: Various

Leonard Cohen chronology
I'm Your Man (1988)	So Long, Marianne (1989)	The Future (1992)

So Long, Marianne is a compilation album by Leonard Cohen, issued in 1989 and in 1995. It features songs from his first four albums, already covered by his 1975 best of album. Although not authorized by the artist, the album is nevertheless an official release, as Cohen's label issued it. The CD was available in several countries with different art covers and in different cheap CD series (Pop Shop in Germany, Collectors Choice in the UK, Memory Pop Shop in the Netherlands, Redhot in the UK), and also as audio cassette with four extra songs.

== Track listing ==
All songs written by Leonard Cohen

1988 CD release
No.	Title	Length
1.	"Who By Fire"	2:30
2.	"So Long, Marianne"	5:37
3.	"Chelsea Hotel No. 2"	3:04
4.	"Lady Midnight"	2:55
5.	"Sisters Of Mercy"	3:34
6.	"Bird On The Wire"	3:24
7.	"Suzanne"	3:46
8.	"Lover Lover Lover"	3:19
9.	"Winter Lady"	2:15
10.	"Tonight Will Be Fine"	3:47
11.	"The Partisan"	3:23
12.	"Diamonds In The Mine"	3:48

1990 Cassette bonus tracks, side one
No.	Title	Length
7.	"You Know Who I Am"
8.	"Is This What You Wanted"
9.	"I Tried To Leave You"

1990 Cassette bonus tracks, side two
No.	Title	Length
7.	"Please Don't Pass Me By (A Disgrace)"

== Certifications ==
Region	Certification	Certified units/sales
Australia (ARIA)	Gold	35,000^{^}
^{^} Shipments figures based on certification alone.
