= The Partisan =

1943 song by Anna Marly and Emmanuel d'Astier, popularised by Leonard Cohen in 1969

"La Complainte du partisan"

Song by Anna Marly
- Language: French
- English title: The lament of the partisan
- Published: 1945
- Released: 1943
- Genre: Folk; chanson
- Length: 3:38
- Composer: Anna Marly
- Lyricist: Emmanuel d'Astier de La Vigerie a.k.a. Bernard

"The Partisan" is an anti-fascist anthem about the French Resistance in World War II. The song was composed in 1943 by Russian-born Anna Marly (1917–2006), with lyrics by French Resistance leader Emmanuel d'Astier de La Vigerie (1900–1969), and originally titled "La Complainte du partisan" (English: "The lament of the partisan"). Marly performed it and other songs on the BBC's French service, through which she and her songs were an inspiration to the Resistance. A number of French artists have recorded and released versions of the song since, but it is better recognised globally in its significantly, both musically and in the meaning of its lyrics, different English adaptation by Hy Zaret (1907–2007), best known as the lyricist of "Unchained Melody".

Canadian singer-songwriter Leonard Cohen (1934–2016) recorded his version, using Zaret's adaptation, and released it on his 1969 album Songs from a Room, and as a 7-inch single in Europe. Cohen's version re-popularised the song and is responsible for the common misconception that the song was written by Cohen. It has inspired many other artists to perform, record and release versions of the song, including American Joan Baez (born 1941), on her 1972 album Come from the Shadows, and with the title "Song of the French Partisan", Canadian Buffy Sainte-Marie (born c. 1941) and Israeli Esther Ofarim (born 1941).

== La Complainte du partisan ==
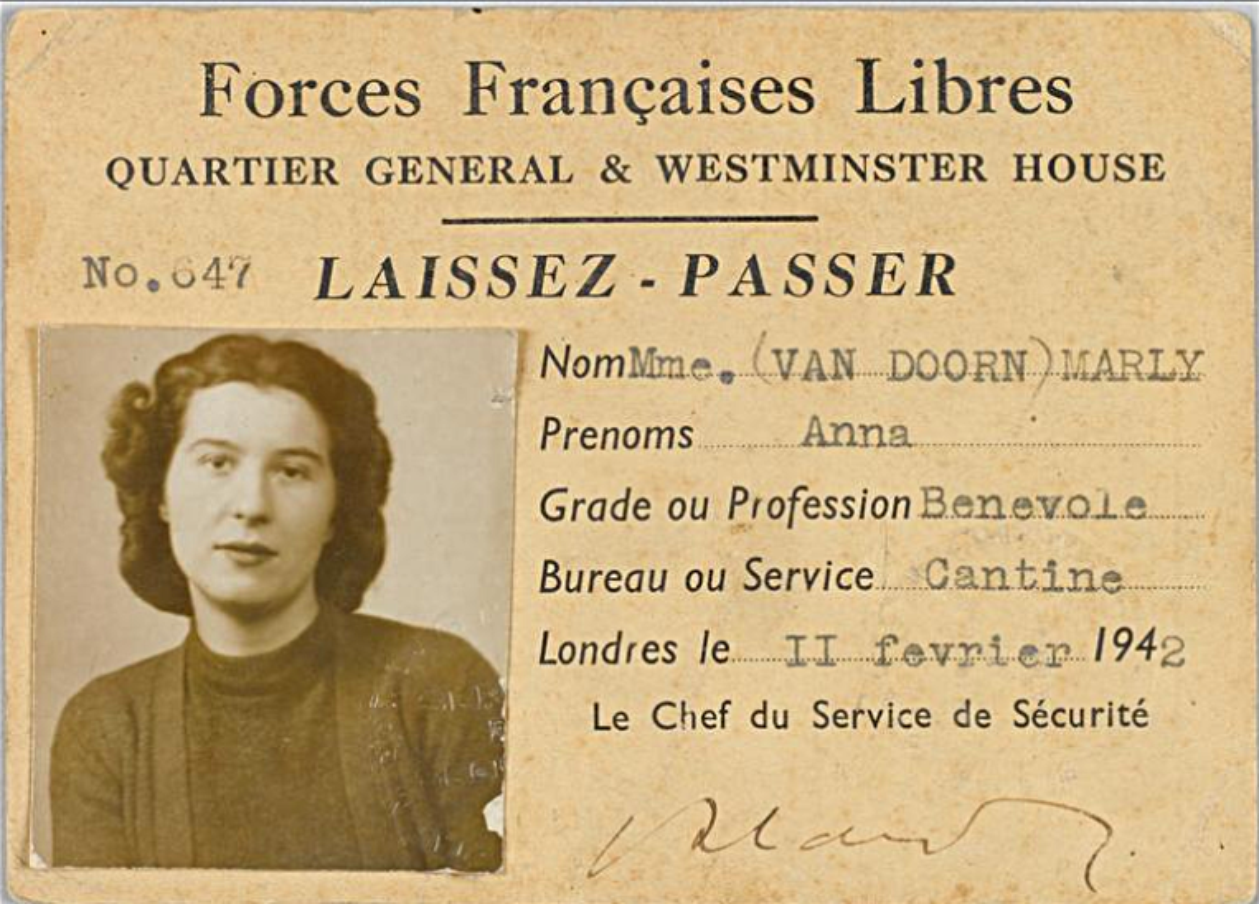
The Free French Forces pass of Anna Marly 1942

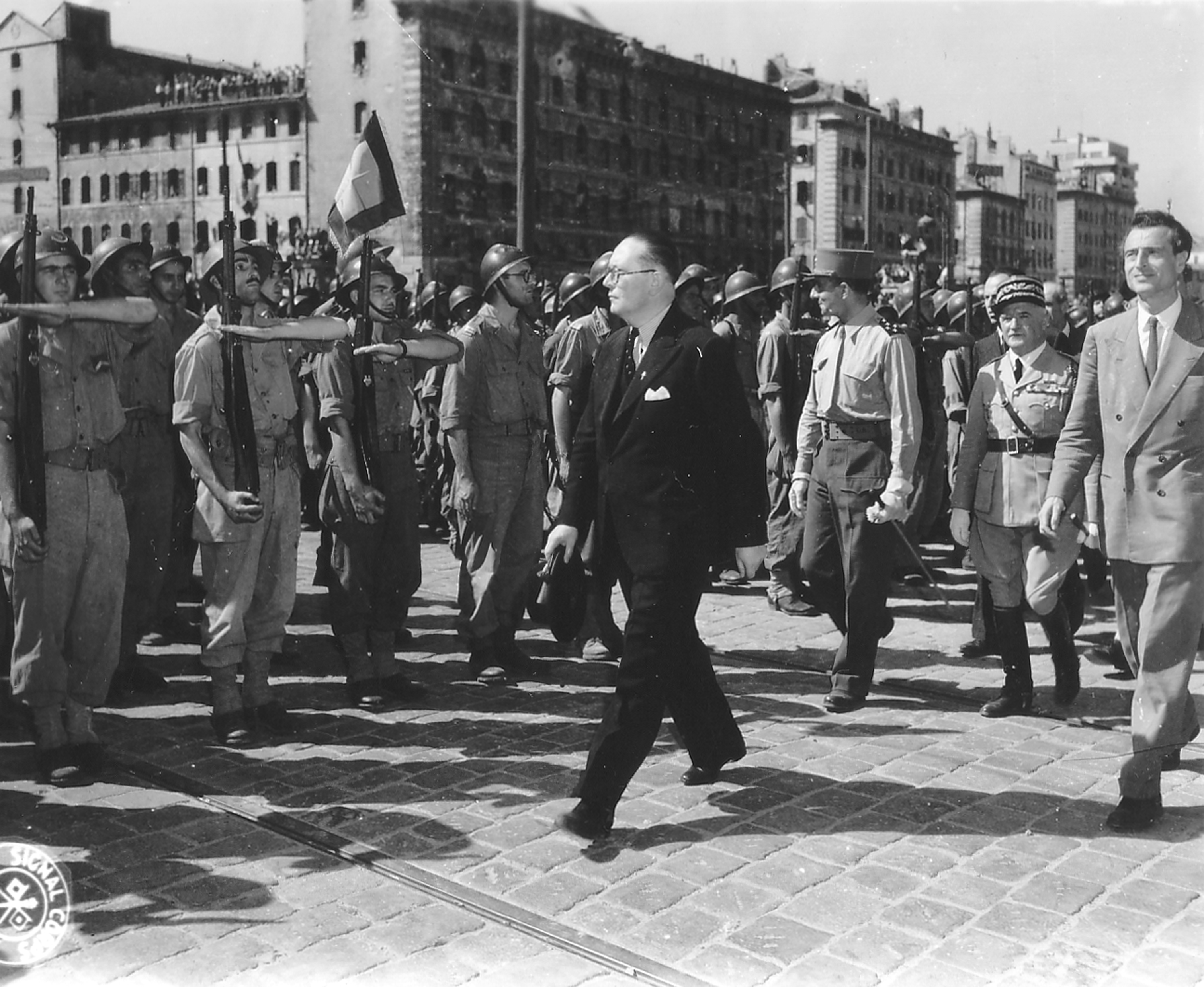
43.2942765°N 5.3743739°E; Emmanuel d'Astier de La Vigerie (far right) with André Diethelm reviewing troops on the wharf of Rive-Neuve in liberated Marseille in 1944

Anna Marly was born in Petrograd on October 30, 1917, and after her father was murdered by the Bolsheviks, she escaped with her mother and sister to a Russian colony in Menton, south-eastern France. Her artistic talents were encouraged from an early age; she was taught guitar by Sergei Prokofiev, and by age sixteen, was dancing in the Ballets Russes in Paris. Becoming refugees upon the outbreak of World War II, her Dutch aristocrat husband and she travelled to London, arriving in 1941. (Note: Martin, The New York Times; Kirkup, The Independent)

Emmanuel d'Astier de La Vigerie was born in Paris on January 6, 1900, and after studying at the private high school Sainte-Geneviève in Versailles, he joined the École Navale (the French naval academy, in charge of the education of the officers of the French Navy) in 1919. Resigning the navy in 1931, d'Astier began a career in journalism, writing for Marianne and VU. With the outbreak of World War II in 1939, he was mobilised to work at the centre de renseignements maritimes de Lorient (English: maritime information center of Lorient) in north-western France, until the Fall of France in 1940. Refusing the armistice with Germany, he co-founded the Resistance movement La Dernière Colonne (English: the Last Column), publishing counter-propaganda against cooperation with Germany, and worked as an editor of the newspaper La Montagne. After the Last Column was decimated by arrests in 1941, he went into hiding under the pseudonym Bernard. By 1943, after meetings in London with Charles de Gaulle, and in Washington with the United States' President Roosevelt, to secure the formation and recognition of the Free French Forces, he again visited London as the Commissioner for Political Affairs of le Directoire des Mouvements unis de Résistance (English: the Directory of United Resistance Movements). (Note: Musée de l'Ordre de la Libération; fondation de la résistance; Bibliothèque nationale de France (BnF); King, Journal of Contemporary History)

Jonathan H. King wrote, of d'Astier, in his article "Emmanuel d'Astier and the Nature of the French Resistance" for the Journal of Contemporary History:

Few men were at the centre of the Resistance, for the reason that its centre could rarely be defined and was rarely stable. Even fewer would have the necessary literary and verbal self-consciousness to achieve the goals [of subjectively documenting historical reality]. One who was at the centre and who did have this self-consciousness was Emmanuel d'Astier.

and that, in his efforts to organise the Resistance,

in his own words, d'Astier was seeking the strength of "popular forces, those forces which alone can change our dreams into reality, adventure into history, aesthetics into politics".

It was in London, in 1943, while Marly ran a hostel for French exiles, that she wrote the anti-fascist anthem "La Complainte du partisan", with lyrics by d'Astier, going on to perform it and her other songs on Radio Londres (English: Radio London), the French Resistance radio operated by the Free French Forces, through the British Broadcasting Corporation. It was at this time that she also wrote "The March of the Partisans", with English lyrics by the Russian ambassador's daughter, Louba Krassine. The French exiles, Joseph Kessel and Maurice Druon, also resident in London, translated it into French for play on Radio Londres and it became "Le Chant des Partisans" (English: "Song of the Partisans"), an unofficial French anthem towards the end of the war.

Marly played guitar and Druon and d'Astier whistled the melody while they were writing the song. It was performed by Anna Marly, broadcast by the BBC and adopted by the maquis. Marly, Druon, along with Claude Dauphin, and Andre Gillois all regularly whistled the song on the BBC right after Marly's singing.

Marly's songs, singing and whistling on Radio Londres, were an inspiration to the French Resistance and earned her the credit "troubadour of the Resistance" from General de Gaulle, leader of the French Free Forces. D'Astier was to become a Chevalier de la Légion d'Honneur (English: Knight of the Legion of Honour), Compagnon de la Libération (English: Companion of the Liberation) and awarded the Croix de Guerre 1939–1945. In Paris, 1945, Raoul Breton published the "La Complainte du partisan" sheet music with lyrics by d'Astier credited to Bernard, his Resistance code name.

=== Structure, content and context ===
In their examination of the songs of Anna Marly, the Académie de Lyon describe "La Complainte du partisan" as "une vision déchirante de l'engagement des résistants" (English: "a heartbreaking vision of the commitment of the Resistance members"), and evaluate its structure and the meaning of its words: the song's lyrics are structured as six quatrains; the first and second lines of each is formed with seven syllables, the third line with five syllables and the fourth with six.

In his analysis for the University of Freiburg, Giacomo Bottà describes d'Astier's lyrics as "very straightforward", then continues:

A partisan recalls, in the first person, episodes of his life ... each verse narrates a different situation: life on the run, the loss of the family, that of comrades, the killing of an old man who hid partisans, up to the ending.

The first five verses (quatrains) depict scenes of Nazi occupied France, the expectation of French people to accept the occupation of their country, and the extraordinary reaction of the Resistance. The first line of the song, "L'ennemi était chez moi" (English: "The enemy was at my house"), where "my house" can be understood as a reference to France, sets the scene. The second line, "On m'a dit 'Résigne-toi'" (English: "I was told 'Resign yourself'"), references the common resignation of the French people in response to Philippe Pétain's radio address, after the Fall of France, announcing his intention to ask for an armistice with Germany.

In the third and fourth lines, "Mais je n'ai pas pu / Et j'ai repris mon arme" (English: "But I could not / And I took my weapon"), d'Astier introduces the notion of resistance, with a risk of death, loss of family, friends and identity and leading a secretive and dangerous life on the run, evoked by the lines "J'ai changé cent fois de nom / J'ai perdu femme et enfants ... Hier encore, nous étions trois / Il ne reste plus que moi / Et je tourne en rond / Dans la prison des frontières" (English: "I changed name a hundred times / I lost wife and children ... Just yesterday, there were three of us / Now there is only me / And I'm going around in circles / Inside the prison of borders").

The dangers d'Astier describes are countered by the expressions "Mais j'ai tant d'amis / Et j'ai la France entière" (English: "But I have so many friends / And I have the whole of France"), describing the support of the Resistance from the French people. In the final verse, d'Astier expresses his hope and confidence that Resistance will not be futile; "Le vent souffle sur les tombes" (English: "The wind blows on the graves") evoking a cleansing wind and "La liberté reviendra / On nous oubliera / Nous rentrerons dans l'ombre" (English: "Freedom will return / We will be forgotten / We will go into the shadows") expressing the confidence that the actions of the mostly anonymous Resistance will have their desired effect.

Marly performed her song self-accompanied by guitar, and introduced each verse instrumentally while whistling the melody.

== Adaptation to English ==
Born in Manhattan, New York City in 1907, Hy Zaret was best known as a Tin Pan Alley lyricist, whose writing credits include those for "Unchained Melody", "One Meat Ball" and several educational and public service songs. He wrote an English version of "La Complainte du partisan" (Note: Jones, Open Culture; Martin, The New York Times) (Note: Zaret obit. The Telegraph; The Little Black Songbook; Hogan, Pitchfork) titled "Song of the French partisan", published by the Leeds Publishing Corporation, New York City, August 11, 1944. Zaret's adaptation includes three of d'Astier's original French verses, with references to L'ennemi (English: "The enemy") changed to Les Allemands (English: "The Germans"), inserted between the penultimate and final English verses. Leonard Cohen used Zaret's adaptation for his creation of "The Partisan", the cover version that popularised the song globally. (Note: Jones, Martin; Young, Consequence of Sound)

Douglas Martin reported for The New York Times that Zaret "loosely translated" the French lyrics, and in his book Passion and Ambivalence: Colonialism, Nationalism, and International Law, author Nathaniel Berman compares excerpts of d'Astier's original French lyrics alongside, what he calls Zaret's English "‍(mis)translation", and notes that "the two versions reflect very different views"; that Zaret's English suggests that the partisans will "come from the shadows", while the French "nous rentrerons dans l'ombre", he states as "we will return to the shadow" (emphasis in quote) in English, suggests that the partisans – the Resistance – are "an artifact of the imperialism that dominates [them]", and that "reconciliation of society with its shadows is an illusion".

Alex Young, for Consequence of Sound, describes the differences between the original French and Zaret's English, saying it "downplays the song's historical content – the English lyrics contain no references to France or the Nazi occupation", with an example of literal English translations of the song's first line, "The Germans were at my house" (French: "Les Allemands étaient chez moi"), being unheard in his English lyrics. Young goes on to compare the literal English translation of the same verse compared by Berman:

Comparison of Marly and Cohen performing, respectively, d'Astier's original French and Zaret's English final verse
Anna Marly; "La Complainte du partisan"; 1963

Leonard Cohen; "The Partisan"; 1969

d'Astier's French(as compared by Berman)

Le vent souffle sur les tombes
La Liberté reviendra
On nous oubliera
Nous rentrerons dans l'ombre

Zaret's English(as compared by Berman)

Oh, the wind, the wind is blowing
Through the graves the wind is blowing
Freedom soon will come
Then we'll come from the shadows

Literal English translation(as compared by Young)

The wind is blowing on the graves
Freedom will come back
Everyone will forget us
We will return to the shadows

Maurice Ratcliff also noted, in his book Leonard Cohen: The Music and The Mystique, that there are differences between the original French and Zaret's English versions; he comments that Leonard Cohen's "The Partisan" is "substantially Zaret's", and while it does also contain verses sung in the original French, references to "The Germans" in the English verses, "become the more neutral 'soldiers'" and "the shelter-giving 'old woman' is 'un vieux[‍sic] homme'" (English: "an old man").

Giacomo Bottà describes Zaret's adaptation as "relatively faithful", while in the Académie de Lyon's evaluation of "La Complainte du partisan", its adaptation and cover versions, they write:

La version de Léonard Cohen propose une traduction fidèle, sauf la dernière strophe, qui est bien plus positive: les résistants sortiront de l'ombre et la liberté sera revenue. Le résistant est montré davantage comme un héros, qui est placé dans la lumière, une fois la liberté revenue. (English: The version of Leonard Cohen offers a faithful translation, except the last stanza, which is much more positive: the resistants will come out of the shadows and freedom will return. The resistance fighter is shown more as a hero, who is placed in the light, once freedom has returned).

They state that:

Cohen était fasciné par cette chanson et se demandait d'ailleurs "si la musique et les écrits n'avaient pas, à eux seuls, renversé Hitler" (English: Cohen was fascinated by this song and wondered, moreover, "if music and writings alone did not overthrow Hitler").

== Leonard Cohen's cover version ==
"The Partisan"

Single by Leonard Cohen

from the album Songs from a Room
- B-side: "Bird on the Wire"
- Released: May 30, 1969
- Recorded: October 1968
- Studio: Columbia Studio A, Nashville
- Genre: Folk
- Length: 3:37
- Label: CBS
- Composer: Anna Marly
- Lyricists: Emmanuel d'Astier de La Vigerie; Hy Zaret
- Producer: Bob Johnston

Leonard Cohen singles chronology
"So Long, Marianne" (1968)	"The Partisan" (1969)	"Joan of Arc" (1971)

While living at a rented farm in Franklin, Tennessee, Leonard Cohen worked on his second album Songs from a Room with Bob Johnston, its producer. In the candlelit Columbia Studio A on Music Row, Nashville, Johnston created a relaxed atmosphere for, what Mike Evans, in his book Leonard Cohen: An Illustrated Record, calls "suitable, and non-intrusive, backing" by the assembled session musicians: Charlie Daniels on bass, fiddle and guitar, Ron Cornelius on guitars, Bubba Fowler on banjo, bass, fiddle and guitar, and Johnston himself playing keyboards. Ten songs were recorded in one eight-hour session, half of which ended up on the album. (Note: Young, Consequence of Sound; Evans, Leonard Cohen: An Illustrated Record)

The recording of "The Partisan" utilized only a classical guitar, double bass, and accordion along with vocals by Cohen and female voices. Bottà states, of Cohen's recording of Zaret's adaptation, that "the melody and chord structure is considerably different from the original" by Marly.

Both writing for The Guardian, Adam Sweeting, in Cohen's obituary, and Dorian Lynskey, in his music blog article, refer to Songs from a Room as being bleak. Sweeting states that it is "another powerful but bleak collection", while Lynskey calls it "sparser and bleaker than the debut", Songs of Leonard Cohen.

Cohen first learned "La Complainte du partisan" from The People's Songbook as a fifteen-year-old boy at summer-camp in 1950. Using Zaret's predominantly English adaptation to record the song, with the title "The Partisan", left Cohen dissatisfied, and he suggested to Johnston that French voices were needed on the track. Johnston reportedly arranged to fly with Cohen to Paris, for "authenticity" according to Maurice Ratcliff, to record a trio of female singers and an accordion player, whose work was overdubbed on to the track. The song fades into an intro, followed by nine verses and an outro that fades out; the first five verses are sung from Zaret's English, followed by verses six, seven and eight being sung in French, and the final verse nine being a repeat of the English verse five.

In May 1969, CBS released the album track, "The Partisan", in Europe as a 7-inch single with, in the initial format, "Bird on the Wire", and in a later format, "Suzanne" on the B-side.

"The Partisan" was to be Cohen's first commercial recording of a song he did not write; writing about Cohen's cover versions of other's songs, in his article for Pitchfork, published soon after Cohen's death, Marc Hogan refers to Cohen's "The Partisan" as a "wonderfully affecting ... haunting version", and Josh Jones, writing for Open Culture, describes it as having a "folk melody and melancholy lyricism", with what Ratcliff calls a "plodding bass line underpinning the simply strummed guitar and an occasional accordion" and "a rare excursion ... into political territory". Tim Nelson, in his BBC review of Cohen's albums, also refers to the song's "biting political commentary".

=== Cultural impact ===
Alex Young writes that "[Cohen] is often incorrectly credited as the composer of the [original] song – although he is certainly responsible for its survival", Douglas Martin states that "'The Partisan' gained popularity" in the United States thanks to Cohen's recording, and Josh Jones writes that the song "[has] become so closely associated with Cohen that it has often been credited to him", with Cohen reportedly remarking, "I kind of re-introduced ['The Partisan'] into the world of popular music. I feel I wrote it, but I actually didn't" (bracketed content in source). Hogan writes that Cohen's version "became one of his signature songs, leading to renditions by Joan Baez, Buffy Sainte-Marie, Electrelane, First Aid Kit, and many others."

Evans writes about a Polish translation of Cohen's—Zaret's—song being adopted as an unofficial anthem of the Solidarity movement for democracy in the detention camps of communist Poland, one of the countries in which Cohen performed while on the Various Positions Tour in 1985, supporting his album that spawned "Hallelujah", Various Positions.

== Other cover versions ==
Luke Reilly, reporting for an article in IGN about the creation of Australian composer Mick Gordon's version of "The Partisan" for the closing credits of the 2015 video game Wolfenstein: The Old Blood, a game in a series depicting the events of a fictionalised World War II, refers to Cohen's "The Partisan" as being "perhaps" the most famous, and reports that the audio director on Wolfenstein, Nicholas Raynor, also called Cohen's version "a famous one"; according to Gordon, it was Raynor's idea to do a cover for the game. The Australian singer-songwriter Tex Perkins was Gordon's first choice to sing his version. Reilly says "the song itself is poignant and heartrending, yet incredibly stirring and motivational. A song that simultaneously mourns what's been lost and steels listeners for a fight to come" and that Gordon and Perkin's version "begins with a softly haunting acoustic intro before escalating to stomping blasts of distorted guitar and heaving drumming".

Recording their 2005 album Axes live in the studio, English group Electrelane included a version of "The Partisan" on the release. Andy Gill, reviewing the album for The Independent, described their style as "a sort of cross between Krautrock, klezmer and free jazz that thrives on the enthusiasm of performance", and that their version is "still recognisable ... despite the churning thrash they give it".

Canadian group Po' Girl included a version on their 2007 album, Home to You, which Sue Keogh described, in her review for the BBC, as an "acoustic mix of guitars, banjos and violin, plus a couple of moments of clarinet and trumpet or wry comments from performance poet CV Avery to keep you on your toes", having a "gentle acoustic sound" with a "bright and breezy yet intimate and charming atmosphere". David Jeffries called the album a "layered, insightful, and achingly poignant triumph" in his review for AllMusic.

Betty Clarke, for the Guardian, reviewed a live show at the Village Underground, London by American group Other Lives in 2012, where they performed a cover of "The Partisan". Clarke says the band create "indie-pop with the scope, precision and polish of Fleetwood Mac's Rumours" (emphasis added), and that their performance of "The Partisan" "encompass[ed] all the elements of Other Lives' sound".

Versions of "The Partisan" have been performed, recorded and released by many other artists, with none being so widely referenced as that by Joan Baez in 1972, (Note: Jones, Martin; Young, Evans) on her album Come from the Shadows, the name of which is derived from Zaret's English lyrics.

=== Song of the French Partisan ===
"Song of the French Partisan"

Song by Buffy Sainte-Marie

from the album She Used to Wanna Be a Ballerina
- A-side: "Soldat Bleu"
- Released: 1970
- Genre: Folk; pop rock
- Length: 3:16
- Label: Vanguard
- Composer: Anna Marly
- Lyricists: Emmanuel d'Astier de La Vigerie; Hy Zaret
- Producers: Jack Nitzsche; Buffy Sainte-Marie

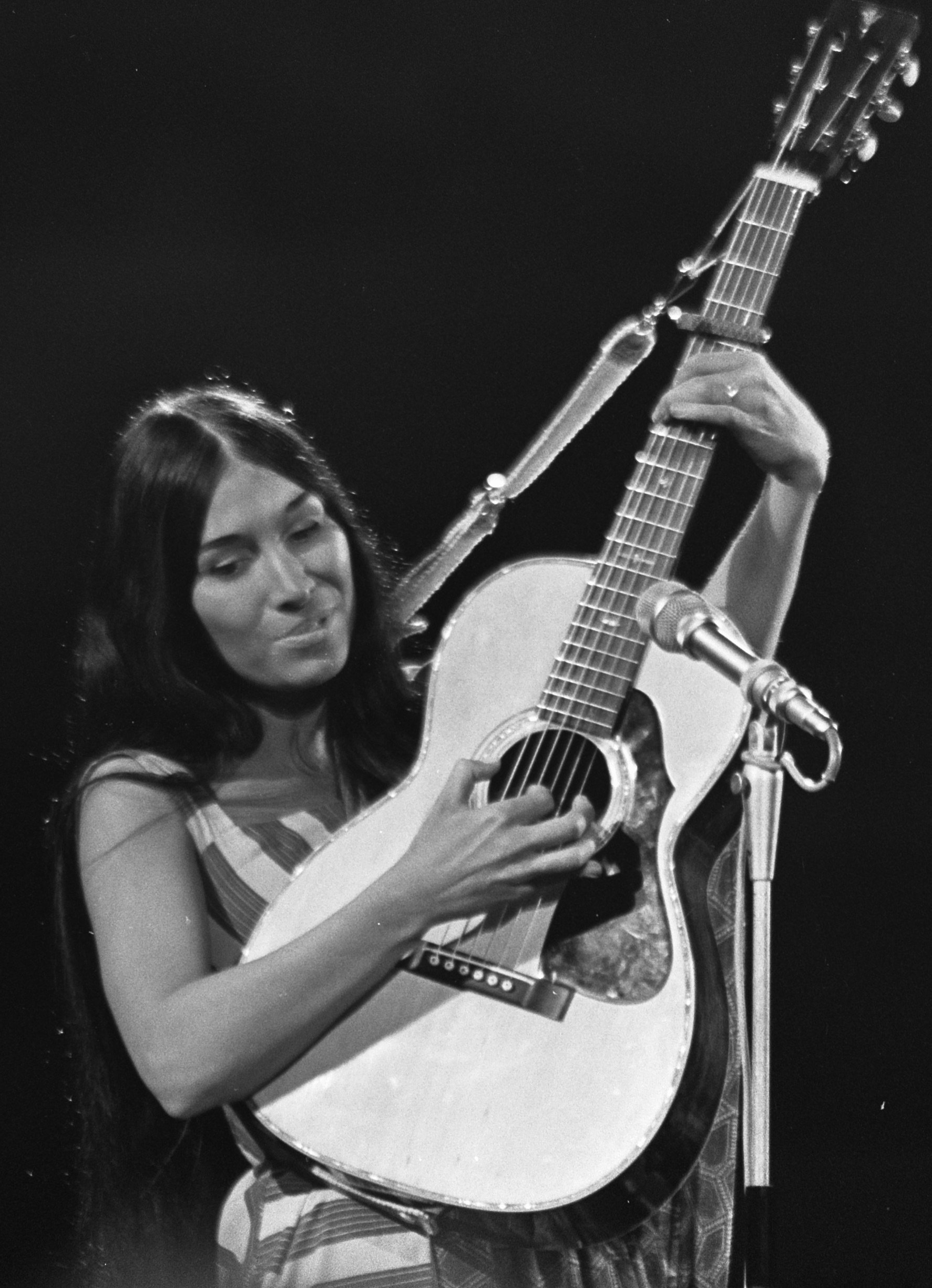
Buffy Sainte-Marie performing at the Grand Gala du Disque in 1968

In 1970, Canadian singer-songwriter Buffy Sainte-Marie provided the title song for the film Soldier Blue, (Note: Ruhlmann, AllMusic review; Positif magazine; Jeune Cinéma magazine) first released as a 7-inch single in France in 1970 by Vanguard Records with the title "Soldat Bleu", and elsewhere in 1971 by RCA Victor as "Soldier Blue", all releases featuring "Song of the French Partisan", the title as published by Zaret, a "folk tune she learned from Leonard Cohen" according to Andrea Warner in her book, Buffy Sainte-Marie: The Authorized Biography, on the B-side. Both songs were included on her 1971 album She Used to Wanna Be a Ballerina. The RCA release of "Soldier Blue" was a top-10 hit in the United Kingdom in 1971, spending eighteen weeks on the singles chart, four in the top-10, two at number seven.

Another version to be produced by Bob Johnston was recorded by Israeli singer Esther Ofarim, who had previously taken second place for Switzerland in the 1963 Eurovision Song Contest and had, with her then husband Abi Ofarim, a British number one hit with the novelty song "Cinderella Rockefella" in 1968. She released the cover on her eponymous 1972 album Esther Ofarim; in his review for AllMusic, Richie Unterberger calls Ofarim's recording of the song one of the highlights, awarding the album three of a possible five stars.

== See also ==
- Protest song – a song that is associated with a movement for social change
- Psychological warfare § World War II – the use of radio to disseminate propaganda during World War II
- “Po dolinam i po vzgoriam” – known as “The Partisan song”
- "We'll Meet Again" – a 1939 song made famous by singer Vera Lynn which resonated with soldiers and their families during World War II
- "A Change Is Gonna Come" – a 1964 song by American recording artist Sam Cooke which became an anthem for African Americans and the Civil Rights Movement
- The Sorrow and the Pity – a two-part 1969 documentary film by Marcel Ophüls about the collaboration between the Vichy government and Nazi Germany during World War II – featuring interviews with and archival footage of Emmanuel d'Astier de La Vigerie
