= Emmanuel d'Astier de La Vigerie =

French journalist, politician and member of the French Resistance

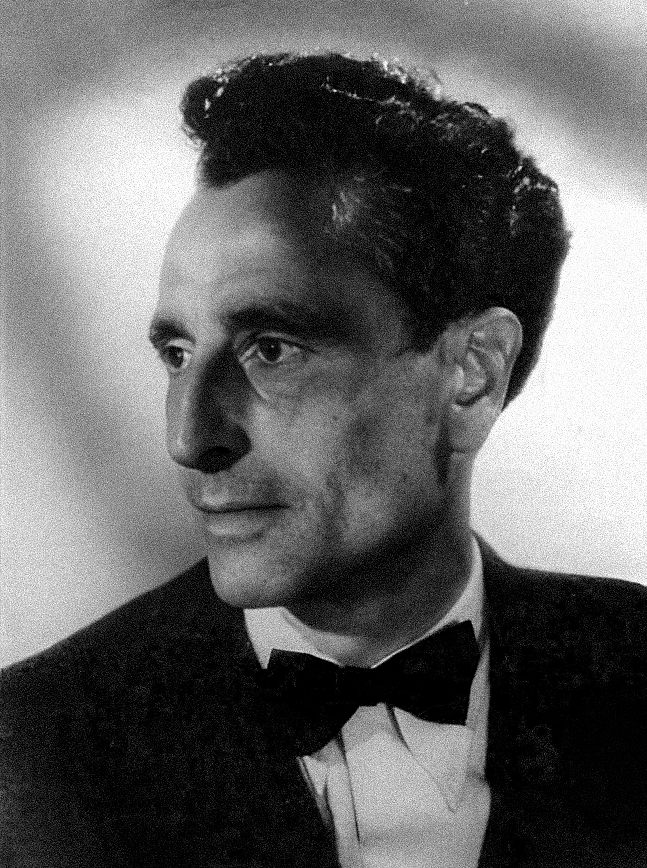
- Born: 6 January 1900; Paris, France
- Died: 12 June 1969 (aged 69); Paris, France
- Political party: Progressive Union (France)

Emmanuel d'Astier de La Vigerie (French pronunciation: [emanɥɛl dastje də la viʒʁi]; 6 January 1900 – 12 June 1969) was a French journalist, politician and member of the French Resistance.

== Biography ==
Born in Paris, he attended the Naval Academy but resigned from the French Navy in 1923. He became a journalist and a poet and was involved with the integralist and monarchist journal Action Française, but turned towards the Left after the Spanish Civil War (1936–39).

In 1931, he married Grace Roosevelt Temple (1894–1977), a member of the American Roosevelt political family (they divorced in 1947 without issue).

When the Second World War broke out, d'Astier re-enlisted into the French Navy and became the head of naval intelligence. However, after the fall of France and the proclamation of Vichy France, he was dismissed for his political dossier.

In Clermont-Ferrand, d'Astier formed the Resistant group La Dernière Colonne, later known as Libération-sud, with Raymond Aubrac, Lucie Aubrac and Jean Cavaillès. During 1941, the group carried out two sabotage attacks at train stations in Perpignan and Cannes. In February, they organised the distribution of 10,000 propaganda flyers, but one of the distributors was caught by the police, leading to the arrest of d'Astier's niece and uncle. The group decided to cease activities. After a few months' hiatus, they began to work on an underground newspaper, Libération. The first edition was put together with the help of the typographers from a local newspaper and printed on paper supplied by local trade-unionists. 10,000 copies were produced in July 1941.

In 1942 d'Astier met with Jean Moulin to discuss the unification of the Resistance and eventually joined forces into the Conseil National de la Résistance (CNR, National Council of Resistance). In 1943 he met Charles de Gaulle in Algiers and joined his Free French Forces government-in-exile as a Commissioner to the Interior.

While in London in 1943, he wrote the lyrics for the song "La Complainte du partisan" with Anna Marly, who wrote the music. In English, it is known as "The Partisan" and was recorded by Leonard Cohen, Joan Baez, Buffy Saint Marie and many others.

After the Liberation, d'Astier became Minister of Interior in the Provisional Government of the French Republic (GPRF). He continued to publish Libération and wrote books based on his experiences. He ran as an ally of the French Communist Party on the Union républicaine et résistante list in the November 1946 French legislative elections, and won a seat in the National Assembly for Ille-et-Vilaine. He was later among the founders of the Union progressiste. In 1958 he received the Lenin Peace Prize. D'Astier was one of the founders of the Stockholm Committee; he denounced the Soviet Union leadership under Nikita Khrushchev after the crushing of the Hungarian uprising, and broke ties with communists.

His brother, Henri d'Astier de la Vigerie, was from the far right, and, initially a member of the Action Française, may even have been involved with the Cagoule terrorist group. Ultimately, Henri d'Astier also took part in the Résistance.

Emmanuel d'Astier died in Paris in 1969. His second wife Liubov ("Luba") was the former spouse of French politician and diplomat Gaston Bergery (divorced in 1928) and the daughter of Bolshevik diplomat Leonid Krasin. They had three sons Jean-François, Christophe and Jérôme. His niece Mrs. Bertrande Blancpain and her husband hosted Svetlana Alliluyeva (the daughter of Soviet leader Joseph Stalin) in their home at Matran near Fribourg, Switzerland, while Alliluyeva defected from the Soviet Union to the United States in 1967.

Family friend Joan Baez wrote and recorded a song, "Luba the Baroness", about learning of the death of the oldest son, Jean-François.
