= Progressive Union (France) =

Political party in France

The Progressive Union (French: Union Progressiste) was a small left-wing party in the French Fourth Republic close to the French Communist Party.
