= Songs of Love and Hate =

Studio album by Leonard Cohen
- Released: March 19, 1971
- Recorded: September 22–26, 1970; August 31, 1970
- Studios: Columbia Studio A, Nashville (Second mix); Isle of Wight, England (First mix); Trident, London (First mix)
- Genre: Contemporary folk
- Length: 44:21
- Label: Columbia
- Producer: Bob Johnston

Leonard Cohen chronology
| Songs from a Room (1969) | Songs of Love and Hate (1971) | Live Songs (1973) |

Singles from Songs of Love and Hate
- 1. "Dress Rehearsal Rag / Avalanche" Released: May 1971; 2. "Diamonds in the Mine" Released: 1971; 3. "Joan of Arc" Released: July 1971

Songs of Love and Hate is the third studio album by Canadian singer-songwriter Leonard Cohen. Produced by Bob Johnston, the album was released on March 19, 1971, through Columbia Records.

== Recording and composition ==
Cohen reunited with producer Bob Johnston, who was at the helm for the singer's previous album Songs From a Room, and also brought back guitarist Ron Cornelius, who acted as leader of Cohen's new crew of backing musicians, christened The Army. The album was mainly recorded in Columbia Studio A in Nashville, between September 22 and 26, 1970. "Sing Another Song, Boys" was recorded at the Isle of Wight Festival on August 30, 1970. Further recording took place at Trident Studios in London. The album title is descriptive, outlining its main themes; it features several of Cohen's most famous compositions, including "Joan of Arc", "Avalanche", and "Famous Blue Raincoat". In the 1996 book Various Positions, Cohen biographer Ira Nadel confirms that many of the songs were from an earlier period, with "Joan of Arc" having been written at the Chelsea Hotel in New York; "Avalanche" and "Dress Rehearsal Rag" dated from earlier years; and "Love Calls You by Your Name" was a minor rewrite of an unpublished 1967 song called "Love Tries to Call You by Your Name". In 1991, Cohen revealed to Throat Culture magazine that the recording of his third album had been a difficult time for him because "absolutely everything was beginning to fall apart around me: my spirit, my intentions, my will. So I went into a deep and long depression."

"Joan of Arc" is constructed mainly as a dialogue between Joan of Arc and the fire which is consuming her as she burns at the stake, after having been found guilty of heresy (in 1431). In the song, Joan says that she is "tired of the war" and tells how she would rather be wearing a white wedding dress (one of the charges against her was that she dressed as a man). Joan's surrender to the fire, as its bride, may also be seen as a symbol of her religious fervour and commitment. In a 1988 interview with John McKenna of RTÉ, Cohen said of "Joan of Arc", "I was thinking more of this sense of a destiny that human beings have and how they meet and marry their destiny...I don't want to suggest in that song that what she really wanted to be was a housewife. What I mean to say is that as lonely and as solitudinous as she was she had to meet and be embraced by her destiny...seen from the point of view of the woman's movement she really does stand for something stunningly original and courageous."

In his 2010 book Leonard Cohen: A Remarkable Life, biographer Anthony Reynolds quotes Cohen explaining that "Famous Blue Raincoat" is about "A man writing a letter to a man who has had an affair with his wife", but, on a more prosaic level, Cohen is also quoted saying that the tune is related to his own attire: "I had a blue raincoat. It was Burberry. It had lots of various fixtures on it...It always resided in my memory as some glamorous possibility that I never realized..." In the book Songwriters on Songwriting, Cohen confessed to being unsatisfied with the composition: "That was one I thought was never finished. And I thought that Jennifer Warnes' version in a sense was better because I worked on a different version for her, and I thought it was somewhat more coherent. But I always thought that that was a song you could see the carpentry in a bit. Although there are some images in it that I am very pleased with. And the tune is real good. But I'm willing to defend it, saying it was impressionistic. It’s stylistically coherent. And I can defend it if I have to. But secretly I always felt that there was a certain incoherence that prevented it from being a great song."

In the same interview, Cohen revealed that his "chop", his unique pattern of playing syncopated classical guitar, is especially evident on "Avalanche", and also asserted, "There are songs like "Dress Rehearsal Rag" that I recorded once and I will never sing. Judy Collins did a very beautiful version of it, better than mine. I would never do that song in concert; I can't get behind it." In the liner notes to the 1975 album The Best of Leonard Cohen, Cohen wrote of "Last Year's Man", "I don't know why but I like this song. I used to play it on a Mexican twelve-string until I destroyed the instrument by jumping on it in a fit of impotent fury in 1967. The song had too many verses and it took about five years to sort out the right ones."

In an interview with Alastair Pirrie of the New Musical Express in March 1973 - just two years after the album was released - Cohen disparaged the LP: "I suppose you could call it gimmicky if you were feeling uncharitable towards me. I have certainly felt uncharitable towards me from time to time over that record, and regretted many things. It was over-produced and over elaborated...an experiment that failed."

Several of the songs from Songs of Love and Hate would be featured on Cohen's 1972 European tour, a trek that would be documented in Tony Palmer's 1974 documentary Bird on the Wire. With the exception of "Last Year's Man", Cohen performed every song live (he had played "Dress Rehearsal Rag" in concert two years before Songs of Love and Hate was released).

== Artwork ==
The front of the album sleeve is a sparsely detailed black-and-white photo of Cohen, smiling, with several days' beard growth. The back cover has no track listing, and quotes Cohen's short poem "They Locked Up A Man":

They locked up a man
Who wanted to rule the world
The fools
They locked up the wrong man

== Reception ==
Professional ratings
Review scores
| Source | Rating |
|---|---|
| AllMusic | 4.5/5 stars |
| BBC | Favorable |
| Christgau's Record Guide | A− |
| The Encyclopedia of Popular Music | 4/5 stars |
| Pitchfork | 8.2/10 |
| Q | 4/5 stars |
| Rolling Stone | 3.5/5 stars |
| Uncut | 4/5 stars |

The album reached no. 145 on the US Billboard 200, but was his most commercially successful album in many other parts of the world, reaching no. 4 in the UK and no. 8 in Australia. Writing in 2011, Cohen biographer Anthony Reynolds noted, "In some quarters it was the album that seemed to seal Cohen's reputation as being something of a downer, to say the least." In his review of the 2007 reissue release, Tim Nelson of BBC Music stated that Cohen's third LP "is perhaps less varied than the first two albums, but the focus is more intense and the sequencing superb. Be warned though: this is one of the scariest albums of the last forty years...". Mark Deming of AllMusic calls Songs of Love and Hate "one of Leonard Cohen's most emotionally intense albums - which, given the nature of Cohen's body of work, is no small statement." In 2012, Rolling Stone ranked the album no. 295 on its list of the 500 Greatest Albums of All Time list, being the only Cohen album to make the list until Songs of Leonard Cohen reached No. 195 on the 2020 reissue, an edition the album failed to make. It was ranked no. 74 on Pitchfork Media's 2004 list of the 100 best albums of the 1970s. "Famous Blue Raincoat" was voted No. 3 in a Rolling Stone readers poll of the top ten greatest Leonard Cohen songs. It was voted number 500 in the third edition of Colin Larkin's All Time Top 1000 Albums (2000).

A remastered CD was released in 1995. Simply Vinyl issued a short-lived remastered edition on vinyl in 2002, making it the last Cohen album (aside from Ten New Songs, which was pressed in limited quantities) to go out of print on vinyl. In 2007, Columbia/Legacy released a newly remastered CD with a new book style packaging and a bonus track: a 1968 recording of "Dress Rehearsal Rag". In 2009, the album (including its bonus track) was included in the 8-CD box set Hallelujah—The Essential Leonard Cohen Album Collection, issued by Sony Music in the Netherlands.

== Cover versions ==
Judy Collins recorded "Dress Rehearsal Rag" in 1966 on the album In My Life, years before it would appear on Songs of Love and Hate. The Art of Time Ensemble featuring Sarah Slean recorded "Dress Rehearsal Rag" for their 2009 album Black Flowers. Nick Cave & the Bad Seeds recorded a version of "Avalanche" for their 1984 album From Her to Eternity, as did Ghost for the deluxe edition of their 2018 album Prequelle, and Aimee Mann for the soundtrack of the documentary miniseries I’ll Be Gone in the Dark. "Famous Blue Raincoat" has been covered numerous times, notably by Jennifer Warnes, who once toured as a back-up singer for Cohen, on her 1987 tribute album to him, Famous Blue Raincoat. It has also been covered by Tori Amos on the Leonard Cohen tribute album Tower of Song. Warnes also covered "Joan of Arc" on Famous Blue Raincoat as a duet with Cohen. Allison Crowe recorded "Joan of Arc" for release on her 2004 album Secrets and this version also appears on the Mojo 2008 tribute compilation CD Cohen Covered. Anna Calvi has also covered "Joan of Arc" live and in the studio, available as a B-side to her single "Desire". Diamonds in the Mine was covered by the British, post-punk, band, Artery on the album “The Second Coming” (1984).

== Track listing ==
All tracks are written by Leonard Cohen.

Side one
| No. | Title | Length |
|---|---|---|
| 1. | "Avalanche" | 5:01 |
| 2. | "Last Year's Man" | 6:02 |
| 3. | "Dress Rehearsal Rag" | 6:12 |
| 4. | "Diamonds in the Mine" | 3:52 |
| Total length: | | 21:07 |

Side two
| No. | Title | Length |
|---|---|---|
| 1. | "Love Calls You by Your Name" | 5:44 |
| 2. | "Famous Blue Raincoat" | 5:15 |
| 3. | "Sing Another Song, Boys" (Live at the Isle of Wight Festival, August 31, 1970) | 6:17 |
| 4. | "Joan of Arc" | 6:29 |
| Total length: | | 23:45 |

2007 reissue bonus track
| No. | Title | Length |
|---|---|---|
| 9. | "Dress Rehearsal Rag" (Bonus track, early version, an outtake recorded during the Songs From a Room sessions, 1968) | 5:37 |

== Personnel ==
- Leonard Cohen – acoustic guitar, vocals
- Ron Cornelius – acoustic and electric guitars
- Charlie Daniels – acoustic guitar, bass guitar, fiddle
- Elkin "Bubba" Fowler – acoustic guitar, banjo, bass guitar
- Bob Johnston – piano, production
- Corlynn Hanney – vocals
- Susan Mussmano – vocals
- The Corona Academy, London – children's voices
- Michael Sahl – strings on third verse of "Last Year's Man"
- Paul Buckmaster – string and horn arrangements, conductor

== Charts ==
| Chart (1971) | Peak position |
|---|---|
| Australian Albums (Kent Music Report) | 8 |
| Canada Top Albums/CDs (RPM) | 63 |
| Dutch Albums (Album Top 100) | 2 |
| German Albums (Offizielle Top 100) | 24 |
| Norwegian Albums (VG-lista) | 11 |
| UK Albums (Official Charts) | 4 |
| US Billboard 200 | 145 |

| Chart (2010) | Peak position |
|---|---|
| Hungarian Albums (MAHASZ) | 27 |

=== Certifications and sales ===
| Region | Certification | Certified units/sales |
|---|---|---|
| Canada (Music Canada) | Gold | 50,000^{^} |
| United Kingdom (BPI) | Silver | 60,000^{‡} |
Summaries
| Worldwide | —N/a | 750,000 |
^{^} Shipments figures based on certification alone.^{‡} Sales+streaming figures based on certification alone.
