= Songs from a Room =

Studio album by Leonard Cohen
- Released: April 7, 1969
- Recorded: October 1968
- Studios: Columbia Studio A (Nashville, Tennessee)
- Genres: Contemporary folk; country
- Length: 35:38
- Label: Columbia
- Producer: Bob Johnston

Leonard Cohen chronology
Songs of Leonard Cohen (1967)	Songs from a Room (1969)	Songs of Love and Hate (1971)

Singles from Songs from a Room
- 1. "Bird on the Wire" Released: April 1969; 2. "The Partisan" Released: 1969

Songs from a Room is the second studio album by Canadian musician Leonard Cohen, released in 1969. It reached No. 63 on the US Billboard Top LPs and No. 2 on the UK charts.

== Background ==
The recording sessions for Songs From a Room began in Hollywood in May 1968 with David Crosby as producer. That didn't work out, and the album was eventually produced at Columbia Studios in Nashville, Tennessee, with producer Bob Johnston (two of the tracks from the Crosby sessions are included as bonus tracks on the 2007 remastered version). Johnston and Cohen had wanted to work together on Cohen's first album, but the studio had assigned Johnston elsewhere. After his experiences with Crosby, Cohen was not keen to continue the project, but after speaking with Johnston, he agreed to carry on as Johnston was prepared to work on achieving the spartan sound Cohen considered appropriate for his songs after the disputes he had with John Simon during the mixing sessions of Songs of Leonard Cohen. At the time, Johnston was best known for producing Bob Dylan, Johnny Cash and Simon and Garfunkel. As Anthony Reynolds observes in his book Leonard Cohen: A Remarkable Life, "Since at this point in time Cohen was something of a hybrid of all of these acts, Cohen moved from the Chelsea in New York City to Franklin, Tennessee, where he lived on a farm 30 miles from Nashville itself. Cohen recorded some demos on the actual farm and otherwise immersed himself in a version of the country life."

== Recording ==
Unlike his augmented debut, Cohen's sophomore effort is austere by comparison, with considerably less drums, and featuring a stripped-down approach that emphasize the words rather than the musical arrangements. In 2001, Cohen admitted to Sylvie Simmons of Mojo, "It's very stark. A lot of my friends who were musical purists had castigated me for the lushness and over-production of my first record and I was determined to do a very simple album." The sessions in Nashville began in the fall of 1968 at Columbia's Studio A on 16th Avenue in Nashville. Johnston enlisted a smaller coterie of musicians than had backed Cohen on his debut album, including Ron Cornelius playing acoustic and electric guitar, Charlie Daniels playing bass, fiddle and acoustic guitar, Elkin "Bubba" Fowler contributing banjo, bass and acoustic guitar, while Johnston himself played keyboards. The album also features some prominent (if strictly ornamental) Jew's harp. As biographer Ira Nadel notes in the 1996 Cohen biography Various Positions, although Cohen still showed signs of insecurity in the recording studio, producer Johnston created a hospitable atmosphere: "In the studio, Daniels and the other musicians were told to listen to Cohen in order to get into the songs. It was like mixing colors; you had to be one of the colors for it to work. Johnston later referred to the album as a painting, not a record, and described his role as 'a musical bodyguard,' protecting Cohen and his music from artificial intrusions and falsification of sound." According to Nadel, Johnston felt that French voices would enhance "The Partisan" so he and Cohen flew to France and overdubbed three female French singers.

== Composition ==
The album contains "Bird on the Wire", one of Cohen's most famous songs. In a 1973 interview with Alastair Pirrie of the New Musical Express, Cohen stated, "The song is so important to me. It's that one verse where I say that I swear by this song, and by all that I have done wrong, I'll make it all up to thee. In that verse it's a vow that I'll try and redeem everything that's gone wrong. I think I've made it too many times now, but l like to keep renewing it." In the liner notes to the 1975 compilation The Best of Leonard Cohen, Cohen wrote about the song: "I always begin my concert with this song. It seems to return me to my duties. It was begun in Greece and finished in a motel in Hollywood around 1969 along with everything else. Some lines were changed in Oregon. I can't seem to get it perfect. Kris Kristofferson informed me that I had stolen part of the melody from another Nashville writer. He also said that he's putting the first couple of lines on his tombstone, and I'll be hurt if he doesn't." In the 1960s, Cohen lived on the Greek island Hydra with his girlfriend Marianne. She has related how she helped him out of a depression by handing him his guitar, whereupon he began composing "Bird on the Wire" – inspired by a bird sitting on one of Hydra's recently installed phone wires, followed by memories of wet island nights. Cohen has described "Bird on the Wire" as a simple country song, and the first recording, by Judy Collins, was indeed done in a country setting. In the book Songwriters on Songwriting, Cohen speaks at length to Paul Zollo about the song:

It was begun in Greece because there were no wires on the island where I was living to a certain moment. There were no telephone wires. There were no telephones. There was no electricity. So at a certain point they put in these telephone poles, and you wouldn't notice them now, but when they first went up, it was about all I did - stare out the window at these telephone wires and think how civilization had caught up with me and I wasn't going to be able to escape after all. I wasn't going to be able to live this 11th-century life that I thought I had found for myself. So that was the beginning. Then, of course, I noticed that birds came to the wires and that was how that song began. 'Like a drunk in a midnight choir,' that's also set on the island. Where drinkers, me included, would come up the stairs. There was great tolerance among the people for that because it could be in the middle of the night. You'd see three guys with their arms around each other, stumbling up the stairs and singing these impeccable thirds. So that image came from the island: 'Like a drunk in a midnight choir.'

In 1988, Cohen explained to John McKenna of RTÉ in Ireland that "Story of Isaac" was an anti-war protest song but added, "I was careful in that song to try and put it beyond the pure, beyond the simple, anti-war protest, that it also is. Because it says at the end there the man of war the man of peace, the peacock spreads his deadly fan. In other words it isn't necessarily for war that we're willing to sacrifice each other. We'll get some idea – some magnificent idea – that we're willing to sacrifice each other for; it doesn't necessarily have to involve an opponent or an ideology, but human beings being what they are we're always going to set up people to die for some absurd situation that we define as important." In the same interview, Cohen confirmed that "Seems So Long Ago, Nancy" was inspired by a woman he had grown up with in Montreal:

I think that the world throws up certain kinds of figures. Sometime in abundance, sometimes very rarely, and that some of these figures act as archetypes or prototypes for another generation which will manifest these characteristics a lot more easily, maybe a lot more gracefully, but not a lot more heroically. Another twenty years later she would have been just like you know, the hippest girl on the block. But twenty years before she was - there was no reference to her, so in a certain way she was doomed.

In sheet music for the album, a song titled "Priests" was included, and although reportedly recorded, it didn't appear on the LP or on any subsequent Cohen record. The song was recorded by Judy Collins on her 1967 album Wildflowers, and by Richie Havens on his 1969 album Richard P. Havens, 1983.

The album cover is a simple black-and-white photo heavily matted as to almost wash out Cohen's face. The back cover features a black-and-white photo of his Norwegian girlfriend Marianne Ihlen sitting at a desk with a typewriter, books and some papers. The picture was taken on the Greek island of Hydra. Cohen used their seven-year relationship as the basis for several of some his earliest songs, including "So Long, Marianne", "Hey, That's No Way To Say Goodbye", and "Bird on the Wire".

== Reception ==
Professional ratings
Review scores
Source	Rating
AllMusic	4/5 stars
Pitchfork	8.8/10
Rolling Stone	negative
Rolling Stone	(2007)
Q	3/5 stars
Uncut	3/5 stars

Songs From a Room was released in April 1969 and hit #63 on the U.S. charts and #2 in the UK. A single, "The Old Revolution", was released but did not chart. Like his debut LP, it received mixed reviews from critics, who were put off by his unusual singing voice but intrigued by the songs. In the original Rolling Stone review, Alec Dubro wrote, "Well, it looks like Leonard Cohen's second try won't have them dancing in the streets either. It doesn't take a great deal of listening to realize that Cohen can't sing, period. And yet, the record grows on you..." Mark Deming of AllMusic calls it "something of a letdown" and "neither as striking or self-assured as Songs of Leonard Cohen" but concedes, "Despite the album's flaws, Songs from a Room's strongest moments convey a naked intimacy and fearless emotional honesty that's every bit as powerful as the debut, and it left no doubt that Cohen was a major creative force in contemporary songwriting." Writing in 2011, Cohen biographer Anthony Reynolds declared, "Compared to the relative 'party' of the previous album, Songs From a Room is the hangover of the morning after... Yet there was a voluptuousness in the album's austerity, a richness of the 'less is more' variety." In a 2014 Rolling Stone readers poll ranking the top ten Leonard Cohen songs, "Bird on a Wire" came in at #5.

Many of the songs from Cohen's second album would appear on 1973's Live Songs, a collection of performances from 1970 and 1972. Songs from a Room was released on CD in 1990. A digitally remastered version, including two bonus tracks produced by David Crosby, was released in February 2007.

== Track listing ==
All songs written by Leonard Cohen except as noted.

Side one
No.	Title	Writer(s)	Length
1.	"Bird on the Wire"		3:25
2.	"Story of Isaac"		3:38
3.	"A Bunch of Lonesome Heroes"		3:15
4.	"The Partisan"	Hy Zaret, Anna Marly	3:37
5.	"Seems So Long Ago, Nancy"		3:39

Side two
No.	Title	Length
6.	"The Old Revolution"	4:48
7.	"The Butcher"	3:19
8.	"You Know Who I Am"	3:28
9.	"Lady Midnight"	2:50
10.	"Tonight Will Be Fine"	3:55

2007 reissue bonus tracks
No.	Title	Length
11.	"Like a Bird (Bird on the Wire)"	3:21
12.	"Nothing to One (You Know Who I Am)"	2:18

== Personnel ==
- Leonard Cohen – vocals, classical guitar, Jew's harp (2, 10)
- Ron Cornelius – acoustic and electric guitar
- Bubba Fowler – banjo, bass guitar, violin, acoustic guitar
- Charlie Daniels – bass guitar, violin, acoustic guitar
- uncredited – backing vocals in French (4)

Technical

- Bob Johnston – production (original album), keyboards
- David Crosby – production (11–12), harmony vocals (12)
- Neil Wilburn – engineer

== Original songs and their covers ==
"Bird on the Wire", described by Cohen as a simple country song, has been covered by many musicians including Jennifer Warnes (his one-time backup singer), The Neville Brothers, Joe Cocker, Willie Nelson, The Lilac Time, Esther Ofarim, Johnny Cash, Fairport Convention and subsequently their guitarist Richard Thompson.

"Story of Isaac", based on the Old Testament story of God's demand that Isaac be sacrificed by his father Abraham, has also been covered by a number of musicians including Judy Collins, Suzanne Vega, Linda Thompson, The Johnstons, Pain Teens, and Roy Buchanan.

"Seems So Long Ago, Nancy" has been translated into Italian by Fabrizio De André and included in his album Volume 8 (1975).

"You Know Who I Am" was covered by Mama Cass in her 1968 album Dream a Little Dream and by Esther Ofarim on the 1968 album Esther Ofarim.

== The Partisan ==
"The Partisan" is Cohen's cover of the French song "La Complainte du partisan" by Emmanuel d'Astier and Anna Marly, which is about the French resistance during World War II. The English translation was written by Hy Zaret. The rock journalist Alex Young notes, "[Cohen] is often incorrectly credited as the composer of the song – although he is certainly responsible for its survival." Young also notes that the English translation that Cohen recorded differs from the French in that it excludes the direct references that d'Astier and Marly made in the original lyrics to the occupation of France by Nazi Germany.

== Charts ==
Chart (1969)	Peak position
Dutch Albums (Album Top 100)	12
UK Albums (Official Charts)	2
US Billboard 200	63

Chart (2016)	Peak position
Italian Albums (FIMI)	91

== Certifications ==
Region	Certification	Certified units/sales
Canada (Music Canada)	Gold	50,000^{^}
United Kingdom (BPI) 2009 release	Silver	60,000^{‡}
^{^} Shipments figures based on certification alone.^{‡} Sales+streaming figures based on certification alone.
