= Famous Blue Raincoat =

Song by Leonard Cohen

from the album Songs of Love and Hate
- Released: March 19, 1971
- Recorded: Fall 1970
- Genre: Folk
- Length: 5:09
- Label: Columbia
- Songwriter: Leonard Cohen
- Producer: Bob Johnston

"Famous Blue Raincoat" is a song by Canadian singer-songwriter Leonard Cohen. It is the sixth track on his third studio album, Songs of Love and Hate (1971). The song is written in the form of a letter (many of the lines are written in amphibrachs). The lyric tells the story of a love triangle among the speaker, a woman named Jane, and the male addressee, who is identified only briefly as "my brother, my killer."

== Background ==
The lyrics contain references to the German love song "Lili Marlene," to Scientology, and to Clinton Street. Cohen lived on Clinton Street in Manhattan in the 1970s when it was a lively Latino area.

In 1994 Cohen said that "it was a song I've never been satisfied with". In the 1999 book, The Complete Guide to the Music of Leonard Cohen, the authors comment that Cohen's question, "Did you ever go clear?", in the song, is a reference to the Scientology state of "Clear".

In the liner notes to 1975's The Best of Leonard Cohen, which includes the song, he mentions that the famous blue raincoat to which he refers actually belonged to him, and not someone else:

I had a good raincoat then, a Burberry I got in London in 1959. Elizabeth thought I looked like a spider in it. That was probably why she wouldn't go to Greece with me. It hung more heroically when I took out the lining, and achieved glory when the frayed sleeves were repaired with a little leather. Things were clear. I knew how to dress in those days. It was stolen from Marianne's loft in New York City sometime during the early seventies. I wasn't wearing it very much toward the end.

Ron Cornelius played guitar on Songs of Love and Hate and was Cohen's band leader for several years. He told Songfacts: "We played that song a lot before it ever went to tape. We knew it was going to be big. We could see what the crowd did—you play the Royal Albert Hall, the crowd goes crazy, and you're really saying something there. If I had to pick a favorite from the album, it would probably be 'Famous Blue Raincoat'."

The original recording starts in the key of A minor, but switches to C major during the choruses. Cohen said, "That's nice. I guess I got that from Spanish music, which has that."

== Reception ==
"Famous Blue Raincoat" is widely considered to be one of Cohen's best songs. American Songwriter ranked the number five on their lists of the 10 greatest Leonard Cohen songs.

== Cover versions ==
"Famous Blue Raincoat" has also been recorded by numerous other artists, including Tori Amos, Joan Baez, Jonathan Coulton, Nathaniel Rateliff, and Eivør and Jared Louche. It provided the title to Jennifer Warnes' album of cover versions of Cohen's songs.

Damien Rice performed the song at the 2017 Tower of Song: A Memorial Tribute to Leonard Cohen concert. First Aid Kit included it in their Who By Fire memorial tribute sung by Maja Francis.

== "When I Need You" comparison ==
The melody of the "hook" line or chorus of "When I Need You" by Leo Sayer is identical to the part of "Famous Blue Raincoat" where the lyrics are as follows: "Jane came by with a lock of your hair, she said that you gave it to her that night, that you planned to go clear." The melody of these lyrics matches the lyrics of "When I Need You" as follows: "(When I) need you, I just close my eyes and I'm with you, and all that I so want to give you, is only a heart beat away."

In a 2006 interview with The Globe and Mail Cohen said:

"I once had that nicking happen with Leo Sayer. Do you remember that song 'When I Need You'?" Cohen sings the chorus of Sayer's number one hit from 1977, then segues into "And Jane came by with a lock of your hair", a lyric from "Famous Blue Raincoat". "Somebody sued them on my behalf ... and they did settle", even though, he laughs, "they hired a musicologist, who said, that particular motif was in the public domain and, in fact, could be traced back as far as Schubert."
