= Ron Cornelius =

American songwriter (1945–2021)

- Born: February 14, 1945; U.S.
- Died: August 18, 2021 (aged 76)
- Genres: Country, Rock
- Occupations: Musician, producer
- Instruments: Guitar, banjo

Ronald Dean Cornelius (February 14, 1945 – August 18, 2021) was a session musician and producer who has played on albums by Leonard Cohen, Bob Dylan, Al Kooper and Loudon Wainwright III. He was also the president of Gateway Entertainment which was established in 1986. As a producer he has produced Miko Marks's Freeway Bound album in 2007. He is also the co-writer of the first version of Leonard Cohen’s song "Chelsea Hotel" (with Cohen), the second version of which has been covered by many artists including Rufus Wainwright.

== Biography ==
In the mid-1960s Cornelius was a member of Capt. Zoom & The Androids aka Captain Zoom. They released three singles including "Here Comes Captain Zoom" b/w "The Zoom". Later he was a key member of a folk country rock band called West that was formed in San Francisco in 1967 that also featured Cornelius on lead guitar and vocals, Michael Stewart on guitar. Other members were Joe Davis, Bob Claire, Jon Sagen and Lloyd Perata. The band recorded the album West in 1968 and two others.

His solo album Tin Luck released on Polydor, PD50ll featured Joe Davis on bass and Paul Distel on drums. Cornelius played both guitar and keyboards. Most of the tracks on the album were composed by him.

== Productions ==
He produced the third album by Miko Marks which was scheduled for release in spring 2007.

== Session work ==
Cornelius played guitar on the album Self Portrait by Bob Dylan, playing with Charles E. Daniels and Bubba Fowler at the Columbia Recording Studios, Nashville, Tennessee on March 17, 1970. The session was produced by Bob Johnston and the tracks were "Early Morning Rain" and "Woogie Boogie". Cornelius also worked alongside Charlie McCoy, Al Kooper and David Bromberg in a recording session for Bob Dylan's 1973 album Dylan.

== Solo discography ==
- Tin Luck, Polydor PD5011

== Session discography (partial) ==
- Leonard Cohen, Songs from a Room, acoustic and electric guitar
- Leonard Cohen, Songs of Love and Hate, guitar
- Leonard Cohen, Live At The Isle of Wight 1970, guitar
- Bob Dylan, Self Portrait, guitar
- Bob Dylan, New Morning, guitar
- Bob Dylan, The Bootleg Series Vol. 10: Another Self Portrait (1969–1971)
- Al Kooper, Al's Big Deal – Unclaimed Freight, guitar
- Loudon Wainwright III, Attempted Mustache, acoustic guitar, electric guitar

== Links ==
- Gateway Entertainment
- All Music Credits
- Interview with Ron Cornelius by Jack Fleischer
