= Avalanche (Leonard Cohen song) =

1971 song written and performed by Leonard Cohen

Song by Leonard Cohen

from the album Songs of Love and Hate
- Released: 1971
- Genre: Folk
- Length: 5:07
- Label: Columbia
- Songwriter: Leonard Cohen
- Producer: Bob Johnston

"Avalanche" is a song by Canadian singer-songwriter Leonard Cohen. It appears on his third studio album, Songs of Love and Hate (1971).

The lyrics are based on a poem he had previously written. He acknowledged in a 1992 interview with Paul Zollo that his "chop", his unique pattern of playing classical guitar, is behind many of his early songs, and this one features Cohen's trademark fast, syncopated classical guitar pattern as the accompaniment on the recording of the song.

== Cover versions ==
"Avalanche"

Song by Nick Cave and the Bad Seeds

from the album From Her to Eternity
- Released: 1984
- Studio: Trident (London)
- Length: 5:10
- Label: Mute
- Songwriter: Leonard Cohen
- Producer: Flood

- Nick Cave and the Bad Seeds recorded a version of the song for their debut studio album, From Her to Eternity (1984). In 2015, as a solo artist, Nick Cave covered "Avalanche" again for season 2 of Black Sails. The Black Sails version was used again in season 2 of Invincible.
- Aimee Mann recorded the song as opening theme for the documentary television series I'll Be Gone in the Dark (2020).
- Swedish rock band Ghost released a cover of the song as a bonus track for their fourth studio album Prequelle (2018).
