= Hey, That's No Way to Say Goodbye =

Song by Leonard Cohen

from the album Songs of Leonard Cohen
- Published: 1967
- Genre: Contemporary folk
- Songwriter: Leonard Cohen
- Producer: John Simon

"Hey, That's No Way to Say Goodbye" is a song by Leonard Cohen. It was first released in November 1967, in a version by Judy Collins on her album Wildflowers. The following month, Cohen's own version was issued on his debut album Songs of Leonard Cohen.

Cohen wrote the song when staying at the Penn Terminal Hotel on 34th Street in New York City in 1966. He wrote:

The room is too hot. I can't open the windows. I am in the midst of a bitter quarrel with a blonde woman. The song is half-written in pencil but it protects us as we manoeuvre, each of us, for unconditional victory. I am in the wrong room. I am with the wrong woman.

Feist, Ariel Engle and Daniela Gesundheit performed the song at the 2017 Tower of Song: A Memorial Tribute to Leonard Cohen concert. Michael Monroe of Hanoi Rocks has also covered the song in memory of his late wife on his album Whatcha Want. Dutch singer Herman van Veen recorded a Dutch translation, Een ochtend vol liefde (A morning full of love) in 1969 on his debut album. The Dutch lyrics were written by Rob Chrispijn.
