= Bird on the Wire =

Single by Leonard Cohen

from the album Songs from a Room
- B-side: "Seems So Long Ago, Nancy"
- Released: April 1969
- Recorded: 26 September 1968
- Studio: Nashville, Tennessee
- Genre: Contemporary folk
- Length: 3:28
- Songwriter: Leonard Cohen
- Producer: Bob Johnston

"Bird on the Wire" is a song written by Canadian musician Leonard Cohen that became one of his signature songs. It was recorded 26 September 1968, in Nashville and included on his 1969 album Songs from a Room. A May 1968 recording produced by David Crosby, titled "Like a Bird", was added to the 2007 remastered CD. Judy Collins was the first to release the song on her 1968 album Who Knows Where the Time Goes. Joe Cocker also covered the song on his second studio album the following year and his version reached number 78 in Canada.

In the 1960s, Cohen lived on the Greek island Hydra with his girlfriend Marianne Ihlen, the woman depicted on the back cover of Songs from a Room. She has related how she helped him out of a depression by handing him his guitar, whereupon he began composing "Bird on the Wire", inspired by a bird sitting on one of Hydra's recently installed phone wires, followed by memories of wet island nights. He finished it in a Hollywood motel.

Cohen has described "Bird on the Wire" as a simple country song, and the first recording, by Judy Collins, was indeed done in a country setting. He later made various minor changes, such as the modifications present on Cohen Live. Different renditions are included on all of his live albums. On occasion he also performed Serge Lama's French version, "Vivre tout seul", in concert.

In the sleevenotes to a 2007 rerelease of Songs From A Room, the song was described as "simultaneously a prayer and an anthem, a kind of Bohemian 'My Way'."

== Composition ==
In the liner notes to the 1975 compilation The Best of Leonard Cohen, Cohen wrote about the song:

I always begin my concert with this song. It seems to return me to my duties. It was begun in Greece and finished in a motel in Hollywood around 1969 along with everything else. Some lines were changed in Oregon. I can't seem to get it perfect. Kris Kristofferson informed me that I had stolen part of the melody from another Nashville writer. He also said that he's putting the first couple of lines on his tombstone, and I'll be hurt if he doesn't.

Joe Hickerson, writing in Sing Out!, suggested that the song to which Kristofferson was referring is John D. Loudermilk's "Turn Me On", which was originally recorded by Mark Dinning in 1961 and later covered by many other artists, including Nina Simone, and which shares a similar melody and some lyrical patterns with Cohen's song.

== Cover versions ==
Many artists have covered the song, often as "Bird on a Wire" (indeed, this variation appears in the compilation The Essential Leonard Cohen), including:

- Tim Hardin on the album Bird on a Wire (1971)
- A version by Jennifer Warnes from her album Famous Blue Raincoat reached number 16 on the Canadian AC Chart in 1987.
- Red Rider's version from The Symphony Sessions reached number 88 in Canada.
- The Neville Brothers on the album Brother's Keeper (1990); also included in the film Bird on a Wire (1990) starring Mel Gibson and Goldie Hawn. This version reached number one in Canada and number five in New Zealand, where it is certified gold.
- Johnny Cash recorded it on 6 December 1993. His version was include in his 1994 album American Recordings.
- Jimmy Barnes and Troy Cassar-Daley on the album Double Happiness (2006). Peaked at number 59 on the ARIA Charts.
- Elvis Costello performed the song at the 2017 Tower of Song: A Memorial Tribute to Leonard Cohen concert.

== Charts ==
=== Leonard Cohen version ===
Chart (1969)	Peak position
Belgium (Ultratop 50 Wallonia)	32

Chart (2016)	Peak position
France (SNEP)	137

=== The Neville Brothers version ===
==== Weekly charts ====
Chart (1990)	Peak position
Canada Retail Singles (The Record)	1
Canada Top Singles (RPM)	34
Canada Adult Contemporary (RPM)	15
Germany (GfK)	35
New Zealand (Recorded Music NZ)	5
UK Singles (Official Charts)	72
US Adult Contemporary (Billboard)	31

==== Year-end charts ====
Chart (1990)	Position
New Zealand (RIANZ)	16

==== Decade-end charts ====
Chart (1990–1999)	Position
Canada (Nielsen SoundScan)	82

== Certifications ==
=== The Neville Brothers version ===
Region	Certification	Certified units/sales
New Zealand (RMNZ)	Gold	5,000^{*}
^{*} Sales figures based on certification alone.
