= Suzanne (Leonard Cohen song) =

- Dutch vinyl single

Single by Leonard Cohen

from the album Songs of Leonard Cohen
- B-side: "Hey, That's No Way to Say Goodbye"; "So Long, Marianne"
- Released: January 1968
- Recorded: Columbia Studio E (New York City)
- Genre: Folk
- Length: 3:48
- Label: Columbia
- Songwriter: Leonard Cohen
- Producer: John Simon

Alternative release
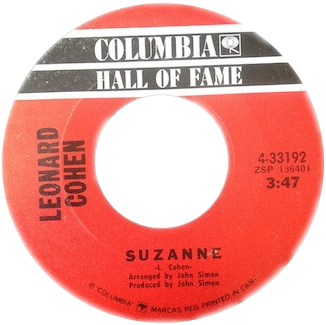
- "Hall of Fame" vinyl rerelease, circa 1970–71 (Canadian edition pictured)

"Suzanne" is a song written by Canadian poet and musician Leonard Cohen in the 1960s. First published as a poem in 1966, it was recorded as a song by Judy Collins in the same year, and Cohen performed it as his debut single, from his debut studio album Songs of Leonard Cohen (1967). Many other singers have recorded it, and it has become one of the most recorded songs in Cohen's catalogue.

Far Out and American Songwriter ranked the song number four and number two, respectively, on their lists of the 10 greatest Leonard Cohen songs. In 2021, it was ranked at No. 284 on Rolling Stone's "Top 500 Greatest Songs of All Time".

== Background ==
"Suzanne" was inspired by Cohen's platonic relationship with the dancer Suzanne Verdal. Its lyrics describe the rituals that they enjoyed when they met: Verdal would invite Cohen to visit her apartment by the harbour in Montreal, where she would serve him Constant Comment tea, and they would walk around Old Montreal past the church of Notre-Dame-de-Bon-Secours, where sailors were blessed before heading out to sea.

Verdal was interviewed by CBC News's The National in 2006 about the song. Verdal says that she and Cohen never had a sexual relationship, contrary to what some interpretations of the song suggest. Cohen stated in a 1994 BBC interview that he only imagined having sex with her, as there was neither the opportunity nor inclination to actually go through with it. Verdal has said she met Cohen twice after the song's initial popularity: once after a concert Cohen performed in the 1970s and once in passing in the 1990s when she danced for him, but Cohen did not speak to her (and possibly did not recognise her). Verdal never benefited financially from the song's commercial success.

Its lyrics first appeared as the poem "Suzanne Takes You Down" in Cohen's 1966 book of poetry Parasites of Heaven. The song was on his debut album Songs of Leonard Cohen (1967). Cohen's recording was released as a single in 1968 but did not reach music charts. The song only charted after Cohen's death in 2016.

== In popular culture ==
Nick Cave performed the song in the 2005 film Leonard Cohen: I'm Your Man.

Martin Sharp wrote the lyrics for Cream's "Tales of Brave Ulysses" to the melody of the Judy Collins version of this song. Eric Clapton later set Sharp's lyrics to his own music.

== Charts ==
Chart (2016)	Peak position
Austria (Ö3 Austria Top 40)	39
France (SNEP)	3
Germany (GfK)	61
Netherlands (Single Top 100)	79
Scottish Singles Sales (Official Charts)	56
Spain (Promusicae)	9
Switzerland (Schweizer Hitparade)	14

== Certifications ==
Region	Certification	Certified units/sales
New Zealand (RMNZ)	Gold	15,000^{‡}
United Kingdom (BPI)	Silver	200,000^{‡}
^{‡} Sales+streaming figures based on certification alone.

== Notable recordings ==
The song "Suzanne" was first performed by The Stormy Clovers in 1966 and then recorded by Judy Collins, appearing on her 1966 album In My Life.

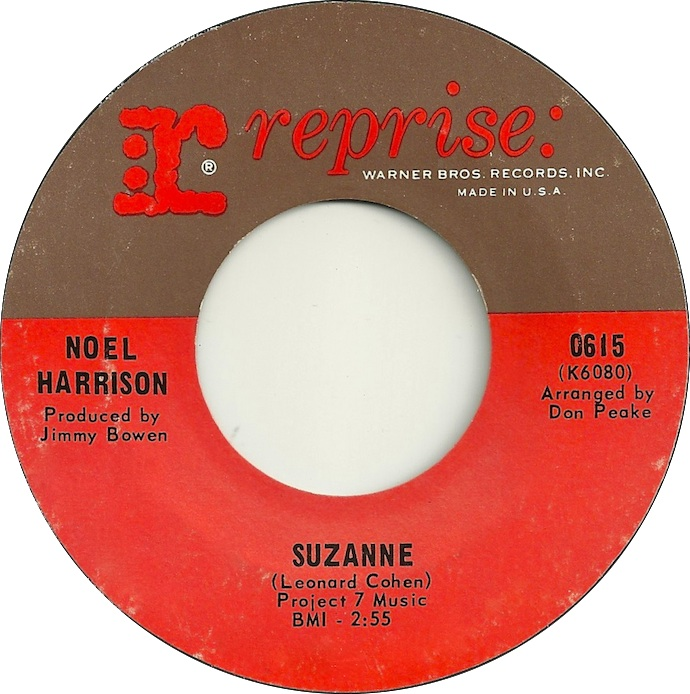
A-side label of Noel Harrison recording (US release pictured)

In 1967, Noel Harrison's version—the second cover of the song—reached number 125 in the Bubbling Under the Hot 100 chart on the week ending September 30. Harrison's version entered the Billboard Hot 100 chart at number 86 on October 28 and peaked at number 56 on November 25, 1967. In Canada it reached number 38.

In 1969, Herman van Veen's Dutch version entered the Dutch Top 40 list at number 39 on April 26 and reached fourth place on May 31. The song was also recorded in 1969 by Nina Simone.

It has since been covered by many other artists, including a young Bruce Springsteen in his band the Castiles. It's the concluding song on Roberta Flack's 1973 album Killing Me Softly.

It has been translated in Italian by Fabrizio De André and included in his album Canzoni (1974).

R.E.M. gave Cohen a joint songwriting credit for their song "Hope" (on their 1998 album Up), in light of the similarity between the two songs.
