= So Long, Marianne =

Song by Leonard Cohen

from the album Songs of Leonard Cohen
- Released: 1967
- Genre: Folk rock
- Length: 5:38
- Label: Columbia
- Songwriter: Leonard Cohen

"So Long, Marianne" is a song written by Canadian poet and musician Leonard Cohen. It was featured on his debut album, Songs of Leonard Cohen.

== Background ==
The song was inspired by Marianne Jensen, born Marianne Ihlen, whom Cohen met on the Greek island of Hydra in 1960. She had recently been left by her husband, the Norwegian writer Axel Jensen, leaving her and their six-month-old son alone on the island. The two hit it off, and Cohen ultimately took her from Hydra back to her home in Oslo, Norway. He later invited her and her son to live with him in Montreal, an offer which she accepted. The two lived together throughout the 1960s, traveling between New York, Montreal, and Hydra.

To quote Leonard Cohen (backcover of “Greatest Hits”, 1976):

I began this on Aylmer Street in Montreal and finished it a year or so later at the Chelsea Hotel in New York. I didn’t think I was saying goodbye but I guess I was. She gave me many songs, and she has given songs to others too. She is a Muse. A lot of people I know think that there is nothing more important than making a song. Fortunately, this belief arises infrequently in their conversation.

Marianne Ihlen herself, however, said that the original words were not "So long, Marianne", but "Come on, Marianne", indicating that in an early version of the song, it was not meant as a goodbye.

Cohen dedicated his third volume of poetry, Flowers for Hitler, to her, and she directly inspired many of his other songs and poems. A photo of her appears on the back cover of his second album, Songs from a Room.

Marianne Ihlen died in hospital in Oslo on July 28, 2016, aged 81. Cohen wrote to her shortly before her death, saying: "I'm just a little behind you, close enough to take your hand. [...] I've never forgotten your love and your beauty. But you know that. [...] Safe travels old friend. See you down the road. Love and gratitude." He died just over three months later, on November 7.

== Recording ==
The song was originally recorded by Cohen in Columbia Studios, New York, as part of his debut album in 1967. Other musicians on the track were backing singer Nancy Priddy, bassist Willie Ruff, drummer Jimmy Lovelace, and members of the band Kaleidoscope – Chester Crill, Chris Darrow, Solomon Feldthouse, and David Lindley – playing a variety of instruments.

== Reception ==
Pitchfork Media placed "So Long, Marianne" at number 190 on their list of "The 200 Greatest Songs of the 1960s". Far Out and American Songwriter ranked the song number one and number four, respectively, on their lists of the 10 greatest Leonard Cohen songs.

== Cover versions ==
The song has been covered by Beck, Noel Harrison, John Cale with Suzanne Vega, Straitjacket Fits, Brian Hyland, James, Bill Callahan, Russian Red, Courtney Barnett, and others, including Cohen's own son, Adam Cohen. In 1984 it became a hit in the Dutch Top 40 sung by José Hoebee, ex-singer of Luv', and TV host Ron Brandsteder.

Adam Cohen and The Webb Sisters performed the song at the 2017 Tower of Song: A Memorial Tribute to Leonard Cohen concert. Courtney Barnett performed the song in her 2019 MTV Unplugged performance.

== Charts ==
| Chart (2016) | Peak position |
|---|---|
| France (SNEP) | 28 |
| Spain (Promusicae) | 38 |
| Switzerland (Schweizer Hitparade) | 50 |

== In popular culture ==
The song is listened to by characters in an episode of American family drama series This Is Us, "So Long, Marianne" (season 4, episode 9).

So Long, Marianne, a Canadian-Norwegian TV series that dramatizes the romance between Cohen and Ihlen which led to the song's composition, premiered on 22 September, 2024. The series stars Alex Wolff as Cohen and Thea Sofie Loch Næss as Ihlen.
