= Songs of Leonard Cohen =

Studio album by Leonard Cohen
- Released: December 27, 1967
- Recorded: October – November 1967
- Studios: Columbia Studio E, New York
- Genre: Folk
- Length: 41:02; 49:11 (CD reissue with bonus tracks)
- Label: Columbia
- Producer: John Simon

Leonard Cohen chronology
Songs of Leonard Cohen (1967)	Songs from a Room (1969)

Singles from Songs of Leonard Cohen
- 1. "Suzanne" Released: January 1968; 2. "So Long, Marianne / Hey, That's No Way to Say Goodbye" Released: 1968

Songs of Leonard Cohen is the debut studio album by Canadian singer-songwriter Leonard Cohen, released on December 27, 1967, on Columbia Records. More successful in Europe than in North America, Songs of Leonard Cohen foreshadowed the kind of chart success Cohen would go on to achieve. It spent nearly a year and a half on the UK Albums Chart, peaking at number 13. In the US, it reached number 83 on the Billboard 200.

== Background ==
Cohen had received positive attention from critics as a poet and novelist but had maintained a keen interest in music, having played guitar in a country and western band called the Buckskin Boys as a teenager. In 1966, Cohen set out for Nashville, where he hoped to become a country songwriter, but instead got caught up in New York City's folk scene. In November 1966, Judy Collins recorded and included Cohen's song "Suzanne" for her album In My Life and Cohen soon came to the attention of record producer John Hammond. Although Hammond (who initially signed Cohen to his contract with Columbia Records) was supposed to produce the record, he became sick and was replaced by the producer John Simon.

== Recording ==
Initially, Hammond had Cohen work up guitar parts for "Master Song" and "Sisters of Mercy" with jazz bassist Willie Ruff, and then brought in some of New York's top session musicians to join them, a move that made Cohen nervous; as biographer Anthony Reynolds observes in his book Leonard Cohen: A Remarkable Life, the dynamic between Cohen and Ruff had been intimate and natural but "the arrival of more anonymous personnel unnerved Cohen, the studio novice put off by their proficiency." Cohen did ask that a full-length mirror be brought into the studio because, as he explained to Mojo in November 2001, "through some version of narcissism, I always used to play in front of a mirror. I guess it was the best way to look while playing the guitar, or maybe it was just where the chair was. But I was very comfortable looking at myself playing." After Hammond dropped out of the sessions, John Simon took over as producer and, by all accounts, Simon and Cohen clashed over instrumentation and mixing; Cohen wanted the album to have a sparse sound, while Simon felt the songs could benefit from arrangements that included strings and horns. Writing for Mojo in 2012, Sylvie Simmons recalls, "When Leonard heard the result, he was not happy; the orchestration on 'Suzanne' was overblown, while everything about 'Hey, That's No Way to Say Goodbye' felt too soft. Several tracks had too much bottom, and there were even drums; Leonard had clearly stipulated no drums." The singer and producer also quarreled over a slight stop in the middle of "So Long, Marianne" – a device Cohen felt interrupted the song. According to biographer Ira Nadel, although Cohen was able to make changes to the mix, some of Simon's additions "couldn't be removed from the four-track master tape".

The instrumentalists – not credited on the album sleeve – included Chester Crill, Chris Darrow, Solomon Feldthouse and David Lindley of Kaleidoscope, who had been recruited personally by Cohen after he saw the band play at a New York club.

== Composition ==
The album features some of Cohen's most celebrated songs. Mojo has described the album as "not only the cornerstone of Cohen's remarkable career, but also a genuine songwriting landmark in terms of language, thematic developments and even arrangements." "Suzanne" was ranked 41st on Pitchfork's 'Top 200 Songs of the 1960s', while "So Long, Marianne" was also featured on the list at 190th. In a 1986 interview with the BBC Cohen explained, "The writing of 'Suzanne,' like all my songs, took a long time. I wrote most of it in Montreal - all of it in Montreal - over the space of, perhaps, four or five months. I had many, many verses to it. Sometimes the song would go off on a tangent, and you'll have perfectly respectable verses, but that have led you away from the original feel of the song. So, it's a matter of coming back. It's a very painful process because you have to throw away a lot of good stuff." In the same interview, Cohen also revealed that "Master Song" was written "on a stone bench at what was the corner of Burnside and Guy Street...I remember sitting on that bench, working out the lyric to that song."

As recounted to Uncut's Nigel Williamson in 1997, "Sisters of Mercy" had been written "in Edmonton during a snow storm, and I took refuge in an office lobby. There were two young back-packers there, Barbara and Lorraine, and they had nowhere to go. I asked them back to my hotel room – they immediately got into the bed and crashed while I sat in the armchair watching them sleep. I knew they had given me something, and, by the time they woke up, I had finished the song and I played it to them.” In the 1996 memoir Various Positions, biographer Ira Nadel contends "Stranger Song" addresses loss, departure, and essential yet destructive nature of love. In the book Songwriters on Songwriting, Cohen told author Paul Zollo that he wrote "So Long, Marianne" "in two hotels. One was the Chelsea and the other was the Penn Terminal Hotel. I remember Marianne (Ihlen, Cohen's girlfriend at the time) looking at my notebook, seeing this song and asking, 'Who’d you write this for?'" When Cohen played in the Isle of Wight in 1970, he told the crowd that he'd written "One of Us Cannot Be Wrong" in a peeling room in the Chelsea Hotel when he was "coming off amphetamine and pursuing a blond lady that I met in a Nazi poster."

By the time the album was released in December 1967, Cohen had already signed away the rights to "Suzanne" and "Stranger Song" (along with "Dress Rehearsal Rag", which would later surface on his 1971 album Songs of Love and Hate), to arranger Jeff Chase, with the singer lamenting to Adrian Deevoy of The Q Magazine in 1991, "Someone smarter than me got me to sign the publishing over to them. I lost 'Suzanne,' 'Stranger Song' and 'Dress Rehearsal Rag.' I finally got them back three years ago, but I lost a lot of money."

== Artwork ==
On the back cover of the album is a Mexican religious picture of the Anima Sola depicted as a woman breaking free of her chains surrounded by flames and gazing towards heaven. In a Rolling Stone interview, Cohen described the image as "the triumph of the spirit over matter. The spirit being that beautiful woman breaking out of the chains and the fire and prison." Cohen found the picture in a botánica near the Hotel Chelsea in 1965. The album's front cover depicts a sepia tint photo of Cohen credited to Machine.

== Reception and legacy ==
Professional ratings
Review scores
Source	Rating
AllMusic	5/5 stars
The Encyclopedia of Popular Music	5/5 stars
Pitchfork	9.6/10
Q	4/5 stars
Rolling Stone	4.5/5 stars
The Rolling Stone Album Guide	4.5/5 stars
Uncut	4/5 stars

The album spent over a year on the UK Albums Chart. The album received mixed reviews at the time of its release, with Arthur Schmidt of Rolling Stone writing, "There are three brilliant songs, one good one, three qualified bummers, and three flaming shits". While praising "Suzanne" for its "moments of fairly digestible surrealism", The New York Times opined in a January 1968 review that on the alienation scale, Cohen rated "somewhere between Schopenhauer and Bob Dylan, two other prominent poets of pessimism".

Critics have been far kinder to the album since its release, with many considering it a highlight in the Cohen canon. Mark Deming of AllMusic states, "The ten songs on Songs of Leonard Cohen were certainly beautifully constructed, artful in a way few (if any) other lyricists would approach for some time, but what's most striking about these songs isn't Cohen's technique, superb as it is, so much as his portraits of a world dominated by love and lust, rage and need, compassion and betrayal...few musicians have ever created a more remarkable or enduring debut." Writing in Mojo in 2012, Sylvie Simmons called the LP "brilliant", adding that it "sounded like nothing of its time—of any time really—fresh and ancient, cryptic and intimate". Brian Howe of Pitchfork declares, "1968's Songs of Leonard Cohen contains many of his most essential songs—'Suzanne,' 'Master Song,' "Stranger Song,' 'Sisters of Mercy,' 'So Long, Marianne'—and establishes the themes and stylistic tics he would pursue relentlessly over the ensuing decades." In 2007, Tim Nelson of BBC Music called the collection "the absolute must-have classic".

It was voted number 149 in the third edition of Colin Larkin's All Time Top 1000 Albums (2000). Though not included in the 2003 original nor the 2012 revision, it was ranked number 195 in the 2020 revision of Rolling Stone's 500 Greatest Albums of All Time list. In a 2014 Rolling Stone readers poll ranking the top ten Leonard Cohen songs, "Suzanne" came in at number two while "So Long, Marianne" came in at number six.

"Stranger Song", "Sisters of Mercy", and "Winter Lady" were included on the soundtrack of Robert Altman's 1971 film McCabe & Mrs. Miller. "Suzanne", "So Long, Marianne", "Sisters of Mercy", "Winter Lady", and "Teachers" were included on the soundtrack of the 1971 film Beware of a Holy Whore by Rainer Werner Fassbinder.

== Releases ==
Songs of Leonard Cohen was released on CD in 1989, while a digipak edition was released in some European countries in 2003. A remastered version, with the bonus tracks "Store Room" and "Blessed is the Memory," was released in the United States on April 24, 2007, and in Japan on June 20, 2007. The Japanese version was a limited edition replica of the original record album cover with lyric card insert. In 2009, the album (including the 2007 bonus tracks) was included in Hallelujah - The Essential Leonard Cohen Album Collection, an 8-CD box set issued by Sony Music in the Netherlands.

== Track listing ==
All tracks written by Leonard Cohen.

Side one
No.	Title	Length
1.	"Suzanne"	3:47
2.	"Master Song"	5:58
3.	"Winter Lady"	2:14
4.	"The Stranger Song"	5:05
5.	"Sisters of Mercy"	3:30

Side two
No.	Title	Length
6.	"So Long, Marianne"	5:37
7.	"Hey, That's No Way to Say Goodbye"	3:05
8.	"Stories of the Street"	4:35
9.	"Teachers"	2:58
10.	"One of Us Cannot Be Wrong"	4:25

2007 reissue bonus tracks
No.	Title	Length
11.	"Store Room"	5:06
12.	"Blessed Is the Memory"	3:03

== Personnel ==
- Leonard Cohen – vocals, acoustic guitar
- Jimmy Lovelace – drums ("So Long, Marianne")
- Nancy Priddy – vocals ("Suzanne", "So Long, Marianne", "Hey, That's No Way to Say Goodbye")
- Willie Ruff – bass ("So Long, Marianne", "Stories of the Street")
- Chester Crill, Chris Darrow, Solomon Feldthouse, David Lindley – flute, mandolin, Jew's harp, violin, various Middle Eastern instruments ("Master Song", "Winter Lady", "Sisters of Mercy", "So Long, Marianne", "Hey, That's No Way to Say Goodbye", "Stories of the Street", "Teachers")
- String arrangements by John Simon

== Charts ==
Chart (1968–69)	Peak position
Dutch Albums (Album Top 100)	4
UK Albums (Official Charts)	13
US Billboard 200	83

Chart (2016)	Peak position
Australian Albums (ARIA)	81
French Albums (SNEP)	152
Norwegian Albums (VG-lista)	36
Portuguese Albums (AFP)	48
Swedish Albums (Sverigetopplistan)	35
Swiss Albums (Schweizer Hitparade)	99

Chart (2025)	Peak position
Greek Albums (IFPI)	16

== Certifications and sales ==
Region	Certification	Certified units/sales
Australia (ARIA)	Platinum	70,000^{^}
Canada (Music Canada)	Gold	50,000^{^}
France (SNEP)	Gold	100,000^{*}
Germany (BVMI)	Gold	250,000^{^}
Switzerland (IFPI Switzerland)	Gold	25,000^{^}
United Kingdom (BPI)	Gold	100,000^{‡}
United States (RIAA)	Gold	500,000^{^}
^{*} Sales figures based on certification alone.^{^} Shipments figures based on certification alone.^{‡} Sales+streaming figures based on certification alone.
