= List of Waterboys members =

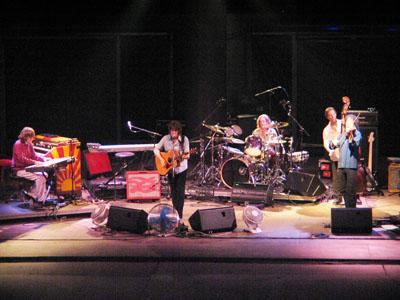
Left to right: Richard Naiff, Mike Scott, Geoff Dugmore, Brad Waissman and Steve Wickham

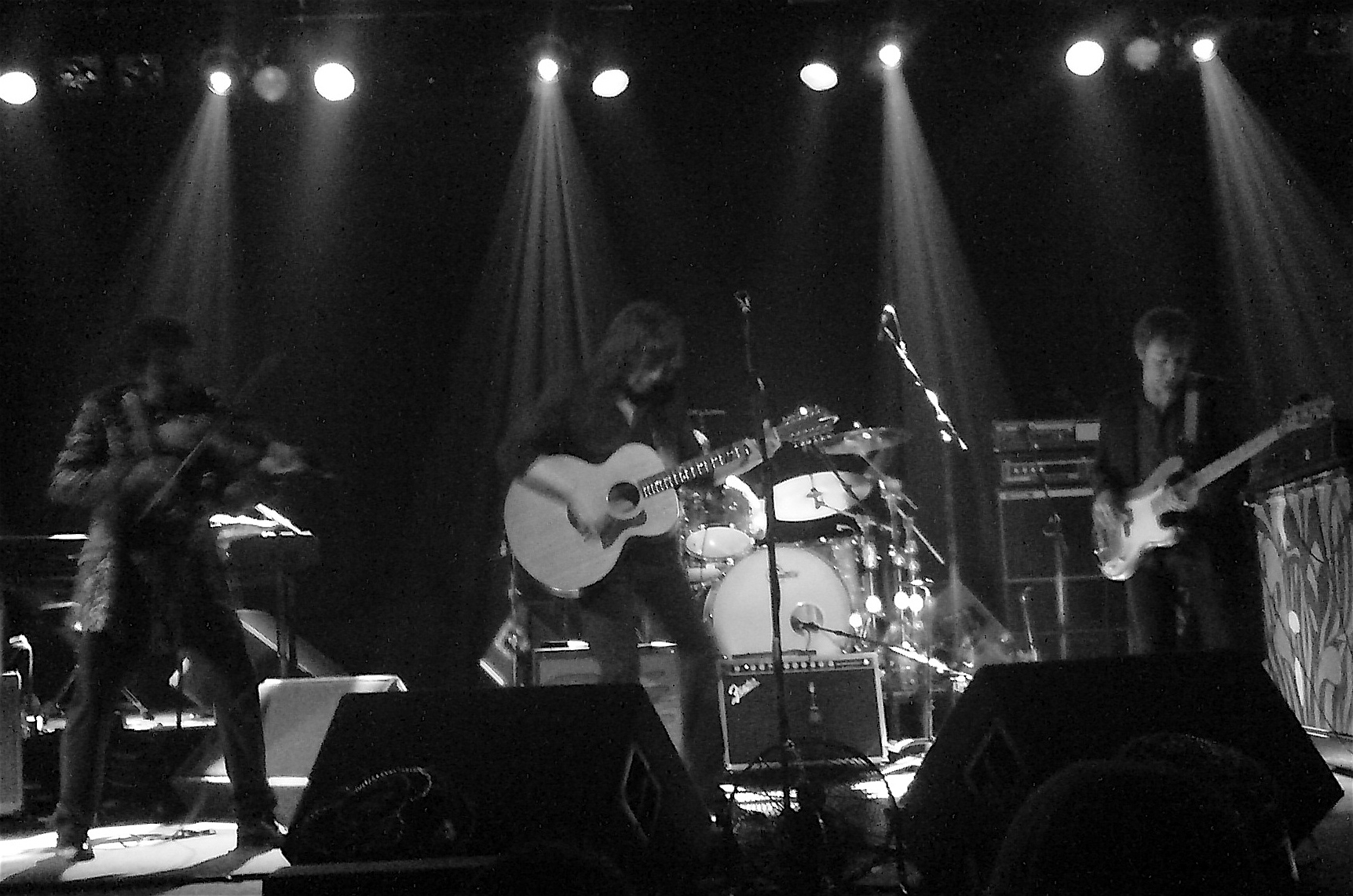
left to right: Richard Naiff (obscured), Steve Wickham, Mike Scott, Damon Wilson (on drums) and Mark Smith

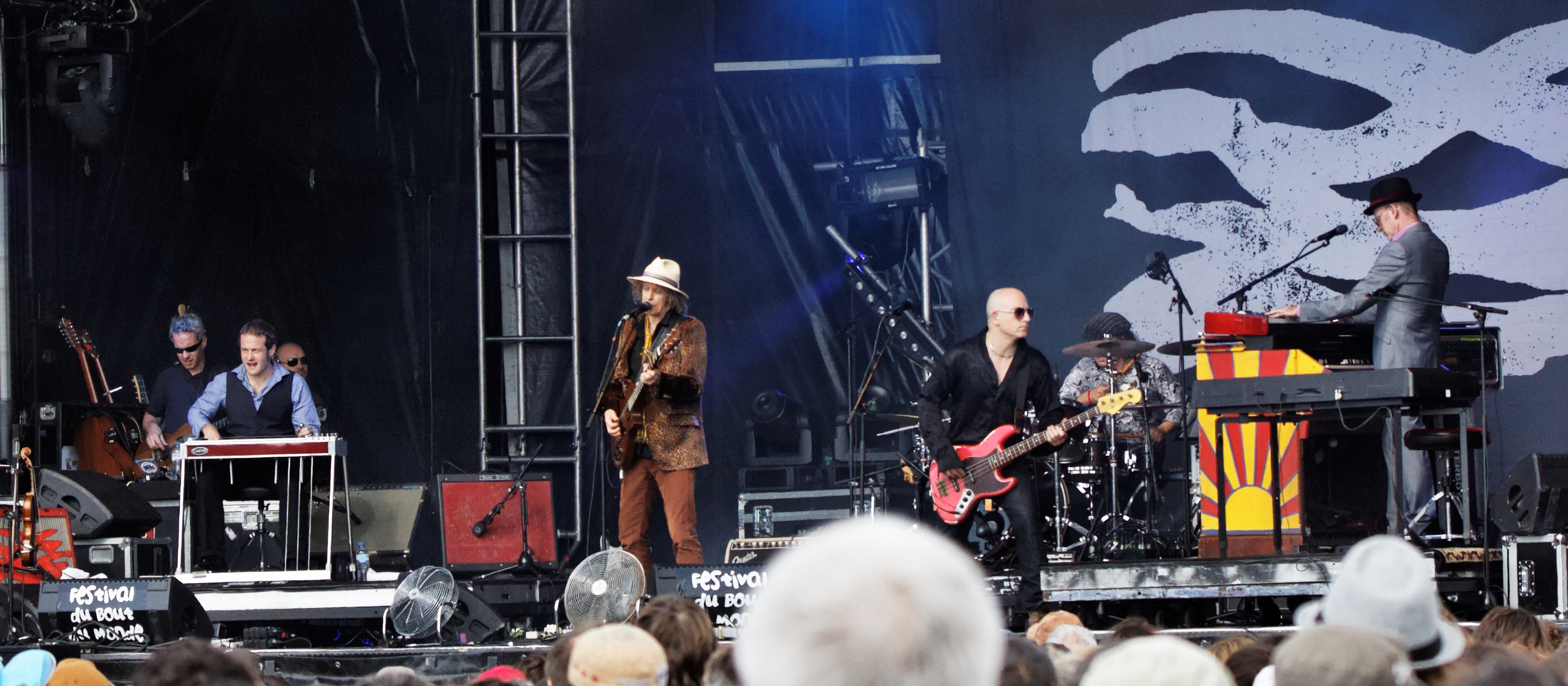
left to right: Melvyn Duffy, Mike Scott, Marc Arciero, Ralph Salmins and James Hallawell (Steve Wickham not shown)

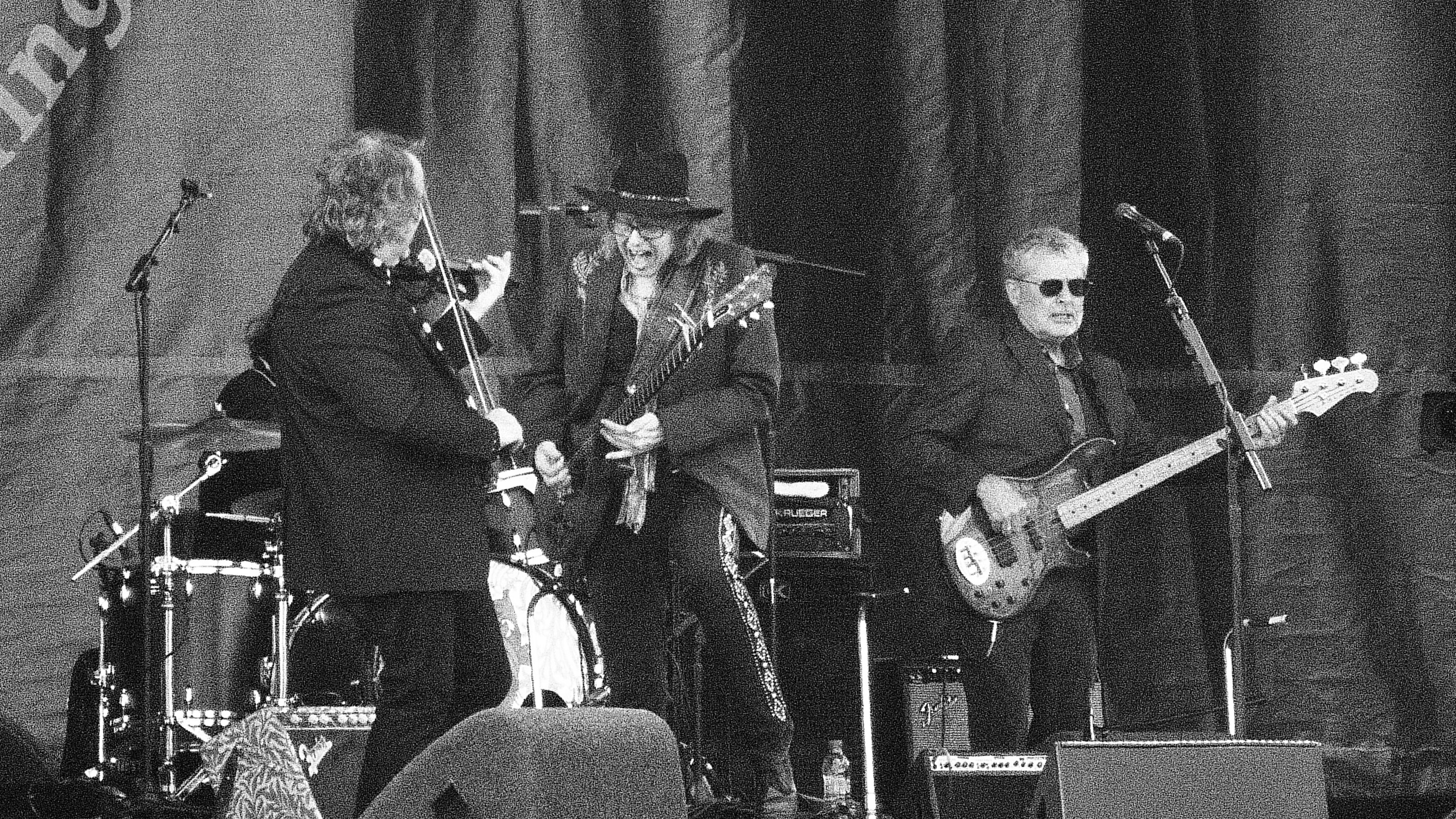
left to right: Ralph Salmins (on drums), Steve Wickham, Mike Scott and David Hood (Zach Ernst and Brother Paul Brown not shown).

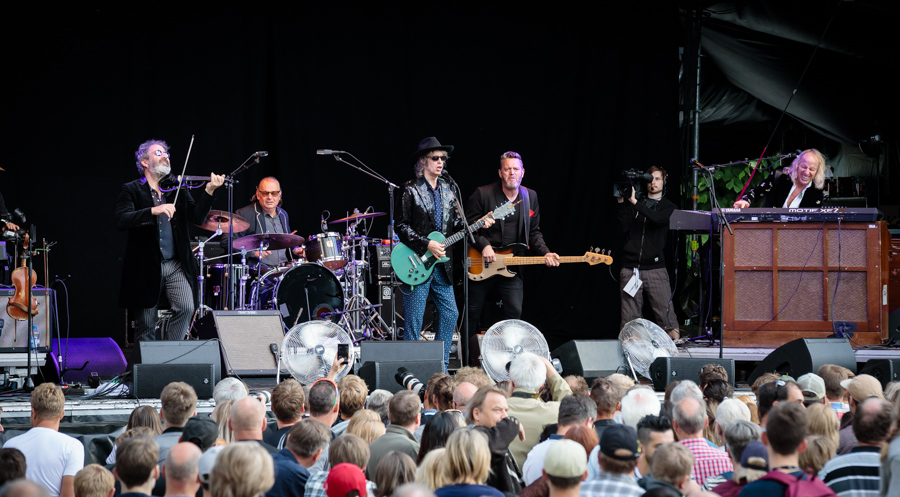
left to right: Steve Wickham, Ralph Salmins, Mike Scott, Aongus Ralston and Brother Paul Brown.

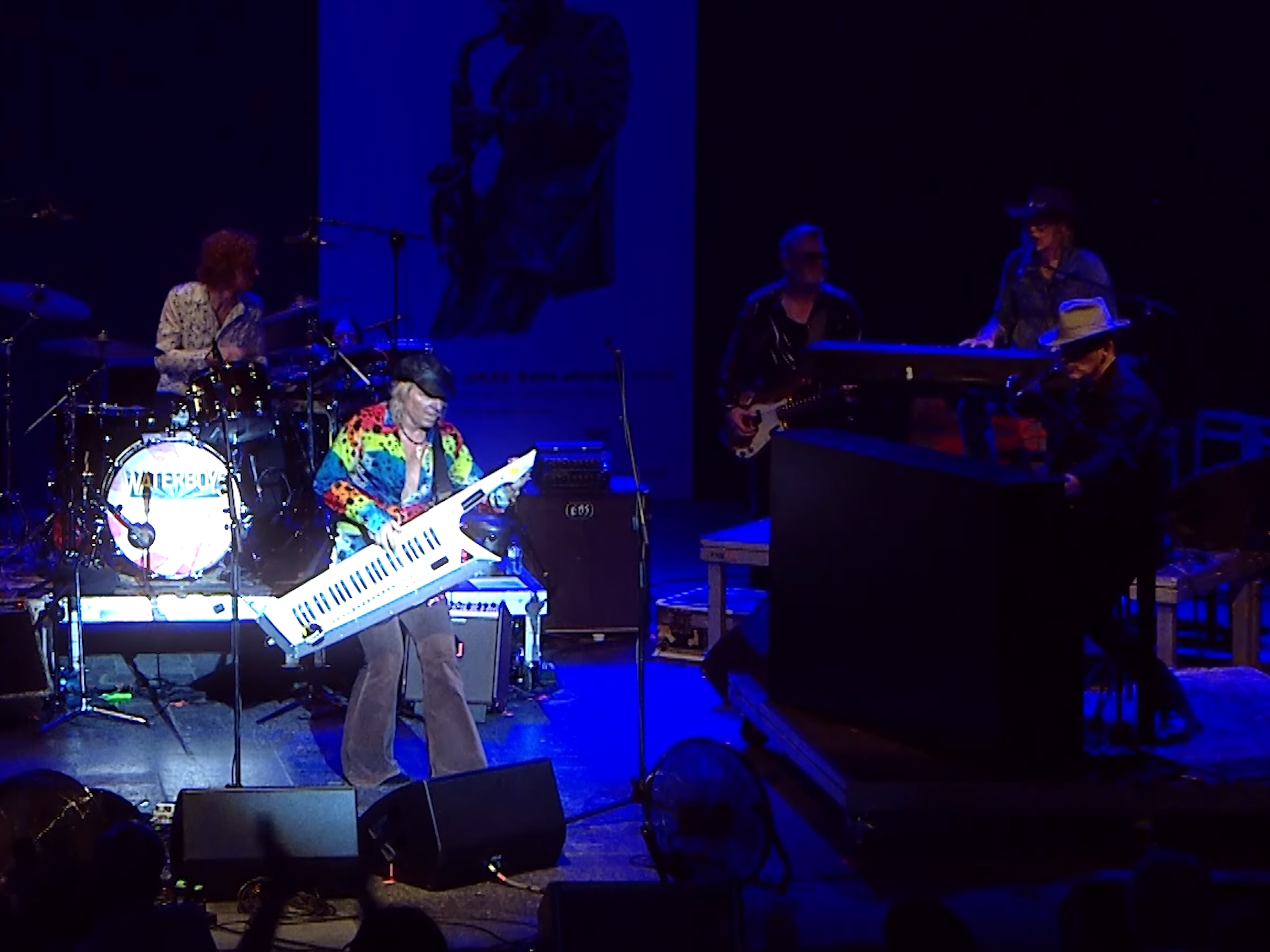
left to right: Eamon Ferris, Brother Paul Brown, Aongus Ralston, Mike Scott and James Hallawell

The Waterboys performing in 2003, 2007, 2012, 2015, 2017 and 2023

The Waterboys are a band formed in 1983 by Mike Scott. The band's membership, past and present, has been composed mainly of Scottish, Irish, English, Welsh and American musicians, with Edinburgh, London, Dublin, Spiddal, New York and Findhorn serving as a base for the group. They have explored a number of different styles, dissolved in 1993 when Scott departed to pursue a solo career and then reformed in 2000. They continue to release albums and tour worldwide. World Party was made up of former Waterboys members. (Note: Karl Wallinger formed the band, Guy Chambers and Chris Whitten later left The Waterboys to join World Party.)

Over 85 musicians have performed live as a Waterboy. Some have spent only a short time with the band, contributing to a single tour or album, while others have been long-term members with significant contributions. Scott has stated that "We’ve had more members I believe than any other band in rock history" and believes that the nearest challengers are Santana and The Fall.

The Waterboys have gone through different musical phases as well as line-ups. In 2019 Scott wrote "The Waterboys is a timeless, genre-confounding band. We belong in no box."

== History ==
=== 1982–1993: original run ===
The Waterboys were formed by Mike Scott in 1982, under the name The Red and The Black, having recently split from his original band Another Pretty Face. Scott was soon joined by saxophonist Anthony Thistlethwaite. Under this name, the band played nine gigs before starting recording. Scott and Thistlethwaite were joined by drummer Kevin Wilkinson. In March 1983, the band released their first single "A Girl Called Johnny" under the name The Waterboys.

For the band's first performance under this name was in May 1983 on the Old Grey Whistle Test, they were joined by Norman Rodger on bass, Karl Wallinger on keyboards, and Preston Heyman covering for Wilkinson on drums. The band released their first, self titled album in July, it featured demos that Scott had recorded between 1981 and 1982, some featuring Thistlethwaite, Wilkinson and Rodger.

The band's first ever concert took place in February 1984, and included Scott, Thistlethwaite, Wallinger and Wilkinson, alongside trumpeter Roddy Lorimer, backing vocalist Eddi Reader, bassist Martin Swain and lead guitarist John Caldwell. The band returned to a five-piece for touring (without Lorimer, Reader and Caldwell). Wilkinson was replaced by Chris Whitten in late 1984. In mid 1985, Steve Wickham joined on fiddle, influencing the band's style into folk music. After a north American tour in November 1985, Whitten and Wallinger both left. The two were replaced by Dave Ruffy and Guy Chambers respectively.

In January 1986, Scott and Thistlethwaite relocated to Dublin (where Wickham is from), creating a new line-up with bassist Trevor Hutchinson and drummer Peter McKinney. Fran Breen briefly replaced McKinney for a show in August. In December, Scott, Thistlethwaite and Wickham did some sessions in San Francisco with legendary drummer Jim Keltner and jazz bassist John Patiticci.

The band returned to live performances in April 1987, again with Hutchinson and McKinney, although McKinney was replaced by Breen in May. The band was also joined by pipe and whistle player Vinnie Kilduff. Roddy Lorimer also briefly rejoined. In April 1988, the band returned to recording, with new drummer Jay Dee Daugherty, gaelic singer Tomas Mac Eoin and flautist/pianist Colin Blakey. Breen returned in December for touring, although he was again replaced by Daugherty in February 1989. Accordionist Sharon Shannon joined in May 1989, replacing Kilduff, alongside Noel Bridgeman, replacing Daugherty.

Despite the success of this line-up (which played profusely and popularly over the next year-and-a-half), Bridgeman was dismissed in July 1990 due to Scott and Thistlethwaite wanting a "tougher" sound, leading to the departure of a dissatisfied Wickham. Ken Blevins was hired as Bridgeman's replacement on drums but the band then moved away from Irish folk music, causing Shannon and Blakey to also depart. Scott, Thistlethwaite, Hutchinson and Blevins fulfilled outstanding tour dates, after which Blevin departed, with Hutchinson leaving in April 1991 to join Shannon's band. The band entered a hiatus after their contract with Ensign Records expired in May and Scott and Thistlethwaite split in December. In January 1992, Scott began recording Dream Harder in New York with many American musicians, most notably Chris Bruce (guitar), Scott Thunes (bass) and Carla Azar (drums), all of whom played with Scott on Top of the Pops. In August 1993, after failed attempts to put together a full-time Waterboys touring lineup, Scott ended the band altogether and spent seven years pursuing a solo career.

=== 1999–present: reformation ===
In January 1999, Scott began recording what would become A Rock in the Weary Land, on 25 November 1999, Scott played a gig of new songs with Richard Naiff on piano and organ. In Summer 2000, Scott officially reformed The Waterboys with a line-up including Naiff on keyboards, Livingston Brown on bass and Jeremy Stacey on drums, all of whom had played on A Rock in the Weary Land which was released in September. In October, Scott and Naiff were joined by Tom Windriff (drums, backing vocals), John Baggott (keyboards, backing vocals) and Gordon Davis (bass, backing vocals). In January 2001, Jo Wadeson and Ian McNabb replaced Davis and Baggott respectively.

Wickham officially rejoined in March 2001, having made regular guest appearances since the band reformed. Also returning was Jay Dee Daugherty, although he was replaced by Ray Fean in July, who in turn was replaced by Geoff Dugmore in August. McNabb returned in May 2002, replacing Wadeson on bass. In June 2002, Brad Waissman and Paul Beavis joined on bass and drums respectively. Dugmore returned in January 2003.

Steve Walters (bass) and Carlos Hercules (drums) joined as new rhythm section in October 2003. In May 2005, Scott, Wickham and Naiff were briefly rejoined by Thistlethwaite (on bass) and Fran Breen, as well as Sharron Shannon and Leo Moran for one show. The band were also briefly joined by Liam O'Maonlai on keyboards, covering for Richard Naiff on some acoustic TV appearances. Walters and Hercules returned in January 2006. By the time the band started recording in August 2006, they were joined by Leo Abrahams on lead guitar, Mark Smith on bass and Brady Blade on drums, among others. Although when it came to touring in March 2007, Abrahams and Blade did not participate. Damon Wilson took up drums.

In February 2009, longtime keyboardist Richard Naiff departed the band. He was replaced by John McCullough, as well as Carlos Hercules returning on drums. Bassist Mark Smith died in November 2009. In March 2010, the band expanded the line-up for a new show called An Appointment with Mr Yeats, musicians featured Joe Chester on guitars and vocals, Simon Wallace on keyboards, Ash Soan on drums, Katie Kim on second vocals, Marc Arciero on bass, Blaise Margail on trombone, Ruby Ashley on oboe and cor anglais, and Sarah Allen on flute. Paul "Binzer" Brennan replaced Soan in June 2010, and James Hallawell replaced Wallace that August.

In January 2011, the band were joined by Ralph Salmins on drums and Kate St John on oboe and sax, replacing Brennan and Allen), these musicians played on An Appointment with Mr Yeats album. Melvin Duffy (pedal steel, guitar) joined the band for 2011 non Yeats summer shows, alongside Scott, Hallawell, Wickham, Arciero and Brennan. Salmins returned in May 2011. Duffy continued to perform with the band until March 2012, after which the band continued as a five-piece. The band played some Australian Yeats shows in early 2013, at which they were joined by Sarah Calderwood on flute and vocals. For North American Yeats shows in 2013, Scott and Wickham were joined by Elizabeth Ziman (vocals), Jay Barclay (guitar), Daniel Mintseris (keyboards), Malcolm Gold (bass), Ezra Oklan (drums) and Chris Layer (flute). For more North American non Yeats dates, Ziman and Layer departed and Chris Benelli replaced Oklan on drums.

When the band returned to Britain/Ireland in November, they were joined by the returning by Arciero, Duffy and Salmins and new organist Brother Paul Brown. Thistlethwaite and Trevor Hutchinson returned for a Fisherman's Blues revisited tour in December 2013, alongside Scott, Wickham and Salmins. In June 2014, the core trio and Brown were joined by Niall C. Lawlor (lap steel) and Shane Fitzsimmons (bass). Richard Naiff briefly returned for some shows in July 2014 before Brown returned. Lawlor and Fitzsimmons were replaced by Zach Ernst (lead guitar) and David Hood in 2014, when the band relocated to Nashville, Tennessee. This line-up continued until August 2016.

In 2017, the band consisted of Scott, Wickham and Brown, alongside Bart Walker (guitar), Aongus Ralston (bass), Jon Green (drums) and backing vocalists Jess Kavanagh and Zeenie Summers. Walker and Green departed in 2017, Salmins returned again. Gavin Ralston joined on guitar for a European tour in 2019. Aongus Ralston was briefly replaced by Jeff Adams for a North American tour in the same year, tech Neil Mahony also played bass as he had previously done in 2016. All subsequent touring was cancelled due to COVID-19.

When the band returned in late 2021, Hallawell rejoined as pianist, performing alongside Brown playing Hammond organ, and Eamon Ferris replaced Salmins on drums. Wickham retired from the band in February 2022. In April 2025, Barny Fletcher joined the band on second vocals for the Life, Death and Dennis Hopper tour having also contributed to the album of the same name. The band was rejoined by Steve Wickham as well as Steve Earle (vocals, guitar, mandolin) and Roar Øien (pedal steel) for a Fisherman’s Blue Revue tour in August and September 2026.

== Notable members info ==
Anthony Thistlethwaite was an original member of the band, and remained a member until 1991 when the band broke up, although he also joined a few recording sessions for A Rock in the Weary Land (1999). Behind Scott and Wickham, Thistlethwaite has more songwriting credits than any other Waterboy. His saxophone (regularly featured in solos) was one half of the early group's distinctive brass section, while his mandolin playing came to the forefront during the group's Irish folk phase. He also contributed parts on guitar, bass guitar, upright bass and keyboards. He pressed to return the Waterboys to a rock music sound after Room to Roam (1990), but this did not occur until Dream Harder (1993), which was recorded after his departure. Thistlethwaite is now a member of The Saw Doctors, and has also released three solo albums. In November 2013, Thistlethwaite and former bassist Trevor Hutchinson returned to the band for a Fisherman's Blues revisited tour.

Original member Kevin Wilkinson was the band's drummer from 1983 to 1984, and continued to play in some studio sessions afterwards. He later appeared on A Rock in the Weary Land (1999), one of his last sessions before his death. Scott describes Wilkinson's drumming as "bright and angular, an unusual sound".

Multi-instrumentalist Karl Wallinger joined the group in 1983, initially as keyboard player, performing on their first TV appearance. Although he left the group only two years later, within that relatively short period he had made important contributions to both A Pagan Place and This Is the Sea. During the recording of the latter, Wallinger's role expanded beyond keyboards, embracing assorted synthesizer approaches and orchestration, drums and percussion, synth bass parts, engineering and production and extra vocal ideas (as well as co-writing the song "Don't Bang the Drum"). Wallinger's World Party project was heavily influenced by his work with the Waterboys and also featured other former members.

Irish fiddler player Steve Wickham transformed the group when he joined in 1985; his interest in folk music directly resulted in the band's change of direction. His initial involvement with the Waterboys ended in 1990 when Scott and Thistlethwaite wanted to return to rock and roll. Wickham rejoined the group in 2001, and remained until 2022 (when he stepped down from touring). Described by Scott as "the world's greatest rock fiddle player", he has written more songs for the band than anyone other than Scott, including the group's handful of instrumental recordings.

Although Sharon Shannon's tenure in the band only spanned eighteen months during 1989 and 1990, her involvement with the Waterboys as accordionist (and occasional second fiddle player) cemented the band's busily-touring "Magnificent Seven" line-up and its full immersion within Irish folk music. With Shannon having already been a teenage accordion prodigy by the time that she joined the Waterboys, Scott observed that "at twenty she was a master player with an insatiable appetite for music and a will of iron. What's more, her sound was the product solely of the world of traditional music. She played nothing but tunes: jigs, reels, strathspeys, polkas and hornpipes. I wanted her unique musical voice, and the tradition she represented, to be part of the band’s identity too." Shannon's work can be heard on the Room to Roam album and the later Magnificent Seven box set. She chose to follow Steve Wickham out of the Waterboys immediately after the recording of the Room to Roam album, when Scott and Thistlethwaite decided to steer the band back towards rock music. Supplementing her Irish and Scottish traditional music interests with reggae, cajun music, Portuguese music and French Canadian music, becoming one of Irish folk's most successful solo artists. Scott observed that "it was she who carried on the Room to Roam experiment, fearlessly mixing folk, rock, country and other influences in her music."

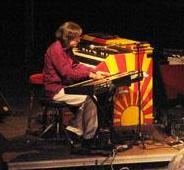
After 2000, Richard Naiff became one of the three core band members.

Keyboard player Richard Naiff (a classically trained pianist and flautist) first recorded with the band in 1999, joined permanently in 2000, and had become a core member by 2007 (alongside Scott and Wickham). Ian McNabb described him as Scott's "find of the century" and reviewers have described him as "phenomenally talented". Naiff officially left the Waterboys in February 2009 to spend more time with his family, but briefly returned to The Waterboys for some shows in July 2014, before Brother Paul Brown took over keyboards again.

"Famous" James Hallawell joined as Waterboys keyboardist and synthesizer player in 2010, playing extensively on the band's 2011 chamber-poetry album An Appointment with Mr Yeats and touring with them over the next two years. Although he temporarily departed the band in 2013 - and wasn't present for 2015's Modern Blues - he subsequently guested on several tracks on 2020's Good Luck, Seeker and co-wrote two of them ("Sticky Fingers" and "Postcard from the Celtic Dreamtime"). Hallawell rejoined as a full member in 2021, mostly concentrating on piano in the live band but playing an much expanded role on 2022's All Souls Hill, also contributing organ, Mellotron, guitar, Marxophone, backing vocals, as well as contributing to sound effects and production (and co-writing "Hollywood Blues"). His multi-instrumental role developed even further for 2025's Life, Death and Dennis Hopper on which he played piano, drums, bass, slide and lead guitars, synthesized orchestra, organ and Wurlizer piano. He also co-wrote nine of the album's twenty-five tracks ("Brooke / 1712 North Crescent Heights", "Andy (A Guy Like You)", "Blues for Terry Southern", "Riding Down to Mardi Gras", "Hopper's on Top (Genius)", "Transcendental Peruvian Blues", "Michelle (Always Stay)", "Frank (Let's Fuck)" and "Golf, They Say"). He has played a number of Waterboys dates as a duo with Mike Scott.

Originally joining the Waterboys in the summer of 2014, Nashville-based "Brother" Paul Brown has remained as keyboard player and occasional guitarist ever since, becoming an integral part of the band's ongoing rock'n'roll/Southern soul phase. He has played on the albums Modern Blues, Out of All This Blue, Where the Action Is, Good Luck, Seeker, All Souls Hill and Life, Death and Dennis Hopper". While specialising in Hammond organ and piano, he has also played synthesizer, Mellotron, Wurlitzer piano and other keyboards, as well as slide and pedal steel guitar, and has also contributed mixing and production, programming, sound effects and "archaeology" to assorted Waterboys projects. He has co-written a considerable number of Waterboys songs during his ongoing tenure ("Live in the Moment, Baby", "Aftermath", "Daria", "(You've Got To) Kiss a Frog or Two", "Dennis Hopper", "Take Me There I Will Follow You", "Nashville, Tennessee" and the title track of Where the Action Is). Like Wickham and Hallawell, he has frequently performed in a Waterboys duo formation with Mike Scott.

Other notable past members have included Ian McNabb (leader of The Icicle Works), experimental musician Thighpaulsandra, keyboardist and producer Guy Chambers (later the musical director for Robbie Williams), Patti Smith drummers Jay Dee Daugherty and Carlos Hercules, and bassists Steve Walters and Mark Smith (the latter of whom was the band's bassist when he died on 3 November 2009).

== Members ==
=== Current members ===
Image	Name	Years active	Instruments	Release contributions
	Mike Scott	1981–1994; 1998–present	lead vocals; guitar; piano; keyboards; Hammond organ; bass; mandolin; drums; harmonica	all releases
	Steve Wickham	1985–1990; 2001–2022 (regular guest 2000–2001); 2026	fiddle; mandolin; vocals; Hammond organ; bass (1985); acoustic guitar (1987)	This Is the Sea (1985); Fisherman's Blues (1988); The Live Adventures of (1998); all releases from Too Close to Heaven (2001) to Good Luck, Seeker (2020); Life, Death and Dennis Hopper (2025)
	James Hallawell	2010–2013; 2021–present	keyboards; backing vocals; occasional guitar	An Appointment with Mr Yeats (2011); Cloud of Sound (2012); All Souls Hill (2022); Life, Death and Dennis Hopper (2025)
	Brother Paul Brown	2013–present	keyboards; backing vocals; occasional guitar	all releases from Modern Blues (2015) to present
	Aongus Ralston	2016–present	bass; backing vocals	all releases from Out of All This Blue (2017) to present
	Eamon Ferris	2021–present	drums	Life, Death and Dennis Hopper (2025)
	Roar Øien	2026	pedal steel guitar	none
	Steve Earle	2026	vocals; guitar; mandolin	none

=== Former members ===
Image	Name	Years active	Instruments	Release contributions
	Anthony Thistlethwaite	1982–1991; 1999 (session); 2005 (one off); 2013	saxophone; mandolin; bass; harmonica; backing vocals; Hammond organ; piano; guitar	all releases from The Waterboys (1983) to Room to Roam (1990); A Rock in the Weary Land (2000); Too Close to Heaven (2001); Fisherman's Box (2013); 1985 (2024)
	Martin Saunders	1982 (only with The Red and The Black)	drums	none
	Steve Fraser	1982 (only with The Red and The Black)	bass	none
	Matthew Seligman	1982; 1985 (session) (died 2020)	bass	1985 (2024)
	Kevin Wilkinson	1982–1985; 1986 (session); 1999 (session) (died 1999)	drums; backing vocals; bass	all releases from The Waterboys (1983) to Fisherman's Blues (1988); A Rock in the Weary Land (2000); Too Close to Heaven (2001); Fisherman's Box (2013); 1985 (2024)
	Norman Rodger	1983 (temporary)	bass; backing vocals	The Waterboys (1983)
	Preston Hayman	1983 (temporary)	drums	"The Three Day Man" (1983)
	Karl Wallinger	1983–1985 (died 2024)	keyboards; backing vocals; bass synth	A Pagan Place (1984); This Is the Sea (1985); 1985 (2024)
	Roddy Lorimer	1983–1984; 1985; 1987; 1988; 2007	trumpet; backing vocals	all releases from A Pagan Place (1984) to Room to Roam (1990); Too Close to Heaven (2001); Book of Lightning (2007); Fisherman's Box (2013); 1985 (2024)
	Martyn Swain	1984–1985; 1985 (one off)	bass	This Is the Sea (1985); 1985 (2024)
	John Caldwell	1984	lead guitar	none
	Eddi Reader	1984	backing vocals	A Pagan Place (1984)
	Chris Whitten	1984–1985	drums	This Is the Sea (1985); 1985 (2024)
	Frank Biddulph	1985	fiddle	none
	Marco Sin	1985 (guest 1989)	bass; guitar (1989)	none
	Max Edie	1985	vocals	This Is the Sea (1985); 1985 (2024)
	Dave Ruffy	1985; 1986; 1999 (session)	drums; backing vocals; percussion	The Live Adventures of (1998); A Rock in the Weary Land (2000); Fisherman's Box (2013); 1985 (2024)
	Guy Chambers	1985; 1986 (guest)	keyboards; piano	The Live Adventures of (1998); 1985 (2024)
	Trevor Hutchinson	1986–1991; 2013	bass; bouzouki	Fisherman's Blues (1988); Room to Roam (1990); The Live Adventures of (1998); Too Close to Heaven (2001); Fisherman's Box (2013)
	Peter McKinney	1986; 1987	drums	Fisherman's Blues (1988); Too Close to Heaven (2001); Fisherman's Box (2013)
	Fran Breen	1986 (one off); 1987; 1988; 2005 (one off)	drums	Fisherman's Blues (1988); Fisherman's Box (2013)
	Leo Moran	1986; 1989; 2005 (guest)	lead guitar	none
	Jim Keltner	1986 (session)	drums	Too Close to Heaven (2001); Fisherman's Box (2013)
	John Patitucci	1986 (session)	bass	Too Close to Heaven (2001); Fisherman's Box (2013)
	Vinnie Kilduff	1987–1989	uilleann pipes; tin whistle; guitar; mandolin	Fisherman's Blues (1988); Too Close to Heaven (2001); Fisherman's Box (2013)
	Colin Blakey	1987–1990; 2003 (guest)	piano; organ; flute; whistle; guitar (2003)	Fisherman's Blues (1988); Room to Roam (1990); Fisherman's Box (2013)
	Noel Bridgeman	1987 (guest); 1989–1990 (died 2021)	drums; percussion; vocals	Fisherman's Blues (1988); Room to Roam (1990); Too Close to Heaven (2001); Fisherman's Box (2013)
	Liam Ó Maonlaí	1987 (guest); 1989 (guest); 2005 (substitute); 2006 (guest)	keyboards; piano; vocals; bodhrán	Fisherman's Box (2013)
	Tomas Mac Eoin	1988; 1989	co-lead vocals	Fisherman's Blues (1988)
	Jay Dee Daugherty	1988; 1989 (guest); 2001	drums	Fisherman's Blues (1988); Too Close to Heaven (2001); Fisherman's Box (2013)
	Sharon Shannon	1989–1990; 2004 (substitute); 2005 (guest); 2007 (guest)	accordion; fiddle	Room to Roam (1990); Karma to Burn (2005)
	Ken Blevins	1990–1991	drums	none
	Chris Bruce	1992–1993	lead guitar	Dream Harder (1993); Book of Lightning (2007)
	Scott Thunes	1992–1993	bass	Dream Harder (1993)
	Carla Azar	1992–1993	drums	Dream Harder (1993)
	Richard Naiff	1999–2008; 2014	keyboards; piano; organ; theremin; flute	A Rock in the Weary Land (2000); Universal Hall (2003); Karma to Burn (2005); Book of Lightning (2007); Cloud Of Sound (2012)
	Jeremy Stacey	1999–2000; 2006; 2008	drums; backing vocals	A Rock in the Weary Land (2000); Book of Lightning (2007); Cloud of Sound (2012); Good Luck, Seeker (2020); Life, Death and Dennis Hopper (2025)
	Livingstone Brown	1999–2000	bass; backing vocals	A Rock in the Weary Land (2000); Cloud of Sound (2012)
	Gordon Davis	2000	bass; backing vocals	none
	Adam Snyder	2000	keyboards	none
	John Baggot	2000	keyboards	none
	Jo Wadeson	2000–2001	bass; backing vocals	none
	Tom Windriff	2000–2001	drums; backing vocals	none
	Ray Fean	2001	drums	none
	Ian McNabb	2001; 2002	keyboards (2001); bass (2002); backing vocals	All Souls Hill (2022)
	Geoff Dugmore	2001; 2002; 2003	drums; backing vocals	none
	Brad Waissman	2002–2003	bass	Cloud of Sound (2012)
	Paul Beavis	2002	drums	A Rock in the Weary Land (2000); Cloud of Sound (2012)
	Carlos Hercules	2003; 2006; 2009	drums	Karma to Burn (2005); Cloud Of Sound (2012)
	Steve Walters	2003; 2006	bass	Cloud Of Sound (2012)
	Mark Smith	2006–2009 (until his death)	bass	A Rock in the Weary Land (2000); Good Luck, Seeker (2020)
	Leo Abrahams	2006–2007 (session only)	lead guitar	Book of Lightning (2007)
	Brady Blade	2006–2007 (session only)	drums	Book of Lightning (2007)
	Damon Wilson	2007–2008	drums	none
	John McCullough	2009	keyboards	none
	Marc Arciero	2009–2013	bass	An Appointment with Mr Yeats (2011)
	Joe Chester	2009–2012; 2014	guitars; backing vocals	An Appointment with Mr Yeats (2011)
	Katie Kim	2009–2010; 2011	vocals	An Appointment with Mr Yeats (2011)
	Blaise Margail	2009–2011	trombone	An Appointment with Mr Yeats (2011)
	Sarah Allen	2009–2011	flute	An Appointment with Mr Yeats (2011)
	Simon Wallace	2009–2010	keyboards	none
	Ash Soan	2009–2010	drums	none
	Ruby Ashley	2009–2010	oboe; cor anglais	none
	Paul "Binzer" Brennan	2010; 2011	drums	none
	Ralph Salmins	2011; 2011–2013; 2013–2016; 2017–2021	drums	An Appointment with Mr Yeats (2011); Modern Blues (2015); Where the Action Is (2019); Good Luck, Seeker (2020); All Souls Hill (2022); Life, Death and Dennis Hopper (2025)
	Kate St John	2011	oboe; cor anglais; saxophone	An Appointment with Mr Yeats (2011)
	Melvin Duffy	2011–2012; 2013	pedal steel; guitar	All Souls Hill (2022)
	Sarah Calderwood	2013	flute; vocals	none
	Jay Barclay	2013–2014	guitar; mandolin; banjo	Modern Blues (2015)
	Malcolm Gold	2013	bass	none
	Daniel Mintseris	2013	keyboards	none
	Elizabeth Ziman	2013	vocals	none
	Chris Layer	2013	flute	none
	Ezra Oklan	2013	drums	none
	Chris Benelli	2013	drums	none
	Shane Fitzsimons [sic]	2014	bass	none
	Niall C. Lawlor	2014	lap steel	none
	Zach Ernst	2014–2016	guitar	Modern Blues (2015)
	David Hood	2014–2016	bass	Modern Blues (2015); Good Luck, Seeker (2020)
	Neil Mahony	2016; 2019 (substitute)	bass	Out of All This Blue (2017)
	Zeenie Summers	2017–2019; 2019–2020	vocals	Out of All This Blue (2017); Good Luck, Seeker (2020)
	Jess Kavanagh	2017–2019; 2019–2020	vocals	Out of All This Blue (2017); Good Luck, Seeker (2020)
	Jon Green	2017	drums	none
	Bart Walker	2017	guitar	none
	Gavin Ralston	2019 (died 2019)	guitar	Good Luck, Seeker (2020)
	Jeff Adams	2019	bass; backing vocals	Modern Blues (2015)
	Audrey Bridgeman	2023	drums	none
	Barny Fletcher	2025	vocals	Life, Death and Dennis Hopper & tour (2025)

== Line-ups ==
Period	Members	Releases
April 1982 (as The Red and The Black)	Mike Scott – vocals, guitar, piano; Anthony Thistlethwaite – saxophone	none – early demos
April – May 1982	Mike Scott – vocals, guitar, piano; Anthony Thistlethwaite – saxophone; Steve Fraser – bass; Martin Saunders – drums	none live shows only
June – July 1982	Mike Scott – vocals, guitar, piano; Anthony Thistlethwaite – saxophone; Matthew Seligman – bass; Kevin Wilkinson – drums	none live shows only
November 1982 – March 1983 (Unnamed and then as The Waterboys)	Mike Scott – vocals, guitar, piano, bass, mandolin; Anthony Thistlethwaite – saxophone, mandolin, bass, percussion, backing vocals; Kevin Wilkinson – drums, backing vocals; with many session musicians	The Waterboys (1983); A Pagan Place (1984) unspecified tracks
May 1983	Mike Scott – vocals, guitar; Anthony Thistlethwaite – saxophone, backing vocals; Norman Rodger – bass, backing vocals; Karl Wallinger – keyboards, backing vocals; Preston Heyman – drums	none – Old Grey Whistle Test performance
September – December 1983	Mike Scott – vocals, guitar, piano, bass; Anthony Thistlethwaite – saxophone, bass, mandolin; Karl Wallinger – keyboards, percussion, backing vocals; Kevin Wilkinson – drums; Roddy Lorimer – trumpet; Eddi Reader – backing vocals	A Pagan Place (1984) unspecified tracks; 1985 (2024)
February 1984	Mike Scott – vocals, guitar, piano; Anthony Thistlethwaite – saxophone, backing vocals; Karl Wallinger – keyboards, backing vocals; Kevin Wilkinson – drums; Roddy Lorimer – trumpet; Eddi Reader – vocals; John Caldwell – lead guitar; Martyn Swain – bass	none – one live performance
April – July 1984	Mike Scott – vocals, guitar, keyboards, percussion; Anthony Thistlethwaite – saxophone, mandolin, bass, backing vocals; Karl Wallinger – keyboards, synth bass, backing vocals; Kevin Wilkinson – drums, bass (session); Martyn Swain – bass	This Is the Sea (1985) unspecified tracks; 1985 (2024)
October – December 1984	Mike Scott – vocals, guitar, keyboards, percussion; Anthony Thistlethwaite – saxophone, mandolin, bass, backing vocals; Karl Wallinger – keyboards, synth bass, backing vocals; Martyn Swain – bass; Chris Whitten – drums	This Is the Sea (1985) unspecified tracks; 1985 (2024)
February 1985	Mike Scott – vocals, guitar, piano; Anthony Thistlethwaite – saxophone, mandolin, backing vocals; Karl Wallinger – keyboards; Martyn Swain – bass; Chris Whitten – drums; Frank Biddulph – electric violin	none – one live performance
February 1985	Mike Scott – vocals, guitar, piano; Anthony Thistlethwaite – saxophone, mandolin, backing vocals; Karl Wallinger – keyboards; Martyn Swain – bass; Chris Whitten – drums; Roddy Lorimer – trumpet	This Is the Sea (1985) unspecified tracks
March 1985 (sessions)	Mike Scott – vocals, guitar, piano; Anthony Thistlethwaite – saxophone, bass, backing vocals; Karl Wallinger – piano, organ, synth bass, drums, vocals; Chris Whitten – drums	This Is the Sea (1985) unspecified tracks; 1985 (2024)
March – May 1986 (session)	Mike Scott – vocals, guitar, piano; Anthony Thistlethwaite – saxophone, bass, backing vocals; Karl Wallinger – piano, organ, synth bass, drums, vocals; Chris Whitten – drums; Kevin Wilkinson – bass, drums; Lu Edmunds – bass	none
June – July 1985	Mike Scott – vocals, guitar, keyboards, percussion; Anthony Thistlethwaite – saxophone, mandolin, bass, backing vocals; Karl Wallinger – keyboards; Martyn Swain – bass; Chris Whitten – drums; Steve Wickham – fiddle	This Is the Sea (1985) unspecified tracks
October – 3 November 1985	Mike Scott – vocals, guitar, piano; Anthony Thistlethwaite – saxophone, mandolin, backing vocals; Karl Wallinger – keyboards; Chris Whitten – drums; Steve Wickham – fiddle; Marco Sin – bass	none – UK tour and Two US dates
November 1985	Mike Scott – vocals, guitar, piano; Anthony Thistlethwaite – saxophone, mandolin, backing vocals; Karl Wallinger – keyboards; Chris Whitten – drums; Marco Sin – bass; Steve Wickham – fiddle; Roddy Lorimer – trumpet	none – Remaining North American tour
December 1985	Mike Scott – vocals, guitar, piano; Anthony Thistlethwaite – saxophone, mandolin, backing vocals; Steve Wickham – fiddle; Guy Chambers – keyboards; Marco Sin – bass; Dave Ruffy – drums	none – European tour
18 December 1985	Mike Scott – vocals, guitar, piano; Anthony Thistlethwaite – bass, saxophone, backing vocals; Steve Wickham – fiddle, bass; Guy Chambers – keyboards; Dave Ruffy – drums	none – European tour
19 December 1985	Mike Scott – vocals, guitar, piano; Anthony Thistlethwaite – saxophone, mandolin, harmonica, backing vocals; Steve Wickham – fiddle; Guy Chambers – keyboards; Dave Ruffy – drums; Roddy Lorimer – trumpet; Martyn Swain – bass	none – European tour
Early January 1986	Mike Scott – vocals, guitar, piano; Anthony Thistlethwaite – saxophone, mandolin, backing vocals; Steve Wickham – fiddle	none – Informal performances in Dublin
Late January – March 1986 (only one show)	Mike Scott – vocals, guitar, piano, Hammond organ, drums; Anthony Thistlethwaite – saxophone, mandolin, harmonica, backing vocals; Steve Wickham – fiddle; Trevor Hutchinson – bass; Peter McKinney – drums	Fisherman's Blues (1988); Fisherman's Box (2013)
22 March – July 1986	Mike Scott – vocals, guitar, piano, Hammond organ, drums; Anthony Thistlethwaite – saxophone, mandolin, harmonica, backing vocals, Hammond organ, piano; Steve Wickham – fiddle, backing vocals; Trevor Hutchinson – bass; Dave Ruffy – drums, backing vocals	Fisherman's Blues (1988); The Live Adventures of the Waterboys (1998); Fisherman's Box (2013)
August 1986	Mike Scott – vocals, guitar, piano; Steve Wickham – fiddle; Trevor Hutchinson – bass; Leo Moran – guitar; Fran Breen – drums	none – one live performance
September – November 1986	Mike Scott – vocals, guitar, piano; Steve Wickham – fiddle; Trevor Hutchinson – bass; Anthony Thistlethwaite – saxophone, mandolin, backing vocals; Noel Bridgeman – drums (session); Kevin Wilkinson – drums (session)	Fisherman's Blues (1988); Fisherman's Box (2013)
December 1986 (sessions only)	Mike Scott – vocals, guitar, piano; Steve Wickham – fiddle; Anthony Thistlethwaite – saxophone; John Patitucci – bass (session); Jim Keltner – drums (session); Plus other session musicians, including Prairie Prince (drums), Ross Valory (bass), Anders Rundblatt (bass) and Scott Mathews (drums)	Too Close to Heaven (2001); Fisherman's Box (2013)
January – August 1987 (sessions only)	Mike Scott – vocals, guitar, piano, Hammond organ, drums; Steve Wickham – fiddle; Trevor Hutchinson – bass; Anthony Thistlethwaite – saxophone, mandolin, harmonica, Hammond organ; with many guest musicians, including Noel Bridgeman (drums), Frank Lane (pedal steel), Pete Thomas (drums), Jimmy Hickey (vocals, percussion), Vinnie Kilduff (uilleann pipes)	Fisherman's Blues (1988); Too Close to Heaven (2001); Fisherman's Box (2013)
April 1987	Mike Scott – vocals, guitar, piano; Steve Wickham – fiddle; Trevor Hutchinson – bass; Anthony Thistlethwaite – saxophone, mandolin, backing vocals; Peter McKinney – drums	Fisherman's Blues (1988); Too Close to Heaven (2001); Fisherman's Box (2013)
22 May 1987	Mike Scott – vocals, guitar, piano; Steve Wickham – fiddle; Trevor Hutchinson – bass; Anthony Thistlethwaite – saxophone, mandolin, backing vocals; Fran Breen – drums; Vinnie Kilduff – pipes, whistles, mandolin	Fisherman's Blues (1988); Too Close to Heaven (2001); Fisherman's Box (2013)
24 May 1987	Mike Scott – vocals, guitar, piano; Steve Wickham – fiddle; Trevor Hutchinson – bass; Anthony Thistlethwaite – saxophone, mandolin, backing vocals; Fran Breen – drums; Vinnie Kilduff – pipes, whistles; Roddy Lorimer – trumpet	Fisherman's Blues (1988); Too Close to Heaven (2001); Fisherman's Box (2013)
September 1987	Mike Scott – vocals, guitar, piano; Steve Wickham – fiddle; Trevor Hutchinson – bass; Anthony Thistlethwaite – saxophone, mandolin, backing vocals; Fran Breen – drums; Vinnie Kilduff – pipes, whistles	Fisherman's Blues (1988); Too Close to Heaven (2001); Fisherman's Box (2013)
October 1987	Mike Scott – vocals, guitar, piano; Steve Wickham – fiddle; Trevor Hutchinson – bass; Anthony Thistlethwaite – saxophone, mandolin, backing vocals; Fran Breen – drums; Vinnie Kilduff – pipes, whistles; Roddy Lorimer – trumpet	Fisherman's Blues (1988); Too Close to Heaven (2001); Fisherman's Box (2013)
April – October 1988 (sessions only)	Mike Scott – vocals, guitar, piano, Hammond organ, drums; Steve Wickham – fiddle; Trevor Hutchinson – bass; Anthony Thistlethwaite – saxophone, mandolin, backing vocals, harmonica, Hammond organ; Vinnie Kilduff – pipes, whistles, guitar; Colin Blakey – piano, flute, horns; Jay Dee Daugherty – drums; Tomas Mac Eoin – vocals	Fisherman's Blues (1988); Too Close to Heaven (2001); Fisherman's Box (2013)
December 1988	Mike Scott – vocals, guitar, piano; Steve Wickham – fiddle; Trevor Hutchinson – bass; Anthony Thistlethwaite – saxophone, mandolin, backing vocals; Vinnie Kilduff – pipes, whistles, guitar; Colin Blakey – piano, flute, whistle; Tomas Mac Eoin – vocals; Roddy Lorimer – trumpet; Fran Breen – drums	none – Ireland tours
Late January – March 1989	Mike Scott – vocals, guitar, piano; Steve Wickham – fiddle; Trevor Hutchinson – bass; Anthony Thistlethwaite – saxophone, mandolin, organ, harmonica, backing vocals; Colin Blakey – piano, organ, flute, whistle; Jay Dee Daugherty – drums	none – Ireland tours
June 1989 – May 1990 (sessions only in 1990)	Mike Scott – vocals, guitar, piano, mandolin; Steve Wickham – fiddle, Hammond organ, vocals; Trevor Hutchinson – bass; Anthony Thistlethwaite – saxophone, mandolin, organ, harmonica, backing vocals; Colin Blakey – flute, whistle, piano, organ; Noel Bridgeman – drums, percussion, vocals; Sharon Shannon – accordion, fiddle	Room to Roam (1990)
July – December 1990	Mike Scott – vocals, guitar, piano; Trevor Hutchinson – bass; Anthony Thistlethwaite – saxophone, mandolin, organ, guitar, piano, backing vocals; Ken Blevins – drums	none – European and North American tours
1992 – 1993	Mike Scott – vocals, guitar (studio only), keyboards; Chris Bruce – guitar; Scott Thunes – bass; Carla Azar – drums; With many other session musicians	Dream Harder (1993); Sessions only, except Top of the Pops performance
On Hiatus 1994 – 1999
January 1999 – 2000	Mike Scott – vocals, guitar, piano, organ, synthesizer; with: Gilad Atzmon – saxophone; Paul Beavis – drums; Livingston Brown - bass guitar; Jody Linscott – drums; The London Community Gospel Choir; Cameron Miller – bass guitar; Richard Naiff – piano; Claire Nicholson - background vocals; Dave Ruffy – tambourine, drum programming; Robin Scott – background vocals; Mark Smith – bass guitar; Jeremy Stacey – drums; Rowan Stigner – drum programming; Chris Taggart - drums; Thighpaulsandra – synthesizer, trumpet, keyboards, mellotron; Anthony Thistlethwaite – mandolin, slide mandolin; Kevin Wilkinson – drums	A Rock in the Weary Land (2000)
June 2000	Mike Scott – vocals, guitar, piano, organ; Richard Naiff – piano, keyboards, organ; Livingston Brown – bass, backing vocals; Jeremy Stacey – drums, backing vocals	Cloud of Sound (2012) one track
October 2000	Mike Scott – vocals, guitar, piano; Richard Naiff – keyboards, piano, theremin; Tom Windriff – drums, backing vocals; John Baggott – keyboards, moog synthesiser; Gordon Davis – bass, backing vocals	none – UK tours
October – December 2000	Mike Scott – vocals, guitar, piano; Steve Wickham – fiddle (occasional guest); Richard Naiff – keyboards, piano, theremin; Tom Windriff – drums, backing vocals; John Baggott – keyboards, moog synthesiser; Jo Wadeson – bass, backing vocals	none – UK tours
January – February 2001	Mike Scott – vocals, guitar, piano; Richard Naiff – keyboards, piano, theremin; Tom Windriff – drums, backing vocals; Jo Wadeson – bass, backing vocals; Ian McNabb – piano, keyboards, backing vocals	none – UK tours
March – April 2001	Mike Scott – vocals, guitar, piano; Steve Wickham – fiddle, mandolin, piano; Richard Naiff – keyboards, piano, theremin; Jo Wadeson – bass, backing vocals; Jay Dee Daugherty – drums	none – North American tour
April 2001	Mike Scott – vocals, guitar, piano; Steve Wickham – fiddle, mandolin; Richard Naiff – piano, organ, flute	none – UK shows
June 2001	Mike Scott – vocals, guitar, piano; Steve Wickham – fiddle, mandolin, piano; Richard Naiff – keyboards, piano, theremin, flute; Jo Wadeson – bass, backing vocals; Jay Dee Daugherty – drums	none – European tours
July – August 2001	Mike Scott – vocals, guitar, piano; Steve Wickham – fiddle, mandolin, piano; Richard Naiff – keyboards, piano, theremin, flute; Jo Wadeson – bass, backing vocals; Ray Fean – drums	none – European tours
August – December 2001	Mike Scott – vocals, guitar, piano; Steve Wickham – fiddle, mandolin, piano; Richard Naiff – keyboards, piano, theremin, flute; Jo Wadeson – bass, backing vocals; Geoff Dugmore – drums, backing vocals	none – European shows and North American tour
January – March 2002	Mike Scott – vocals, guitar; Steve Wickham – fiddle, mandolin, banjo; Richard Naiff – piano	none – European shows
May 2002	Mike Scott – vocals, guitar, piano; Steve Wickham – fiddle, mandolin; Richard Naiff – keyboards, piano, theremin, flute; Geoff Dugmore – drums, backing vocals; Ian MacNabb – bass, backing vocals	none – Spanish and Portuguese tour
June 2002	Mike Scott – vocals, guitar, piano; Steve Wickham – fiddle, mandolin, banjo; Richard Naiff – piano	none – Dutch and English shows
June – October 2002	Mike Scott – vocals, guitar, piano; Steve Wickham – fiddle, mandolin, banjo; Richard Naiff – piano, keyboards, flute; Brad Waissman – bass; Paul Beavis – drums	Cloud of Sound (2012) one track
January 2003	Mike Scott – vocals, guitar, piano; Steve Wickham – fiddle, mandolin, banjo; Richard Naiff – piano, keyboards, flute; Brad Waissman – bass; Geoff Dugmore – drums, backing vocals	none – UK shows
May 2003	Mike Scott – vocals, guitar, keyboards, bass, percussion; Steve Wickham – fiddle, bass; Richard Naiff – piano, flute	Universal Hall (2003)
June – July 2003	Mike Scott – vocals, guitar, piano; Steve Wickham – fiddle, mandolin, banjo; Richard Naiff – keyboards, flute; Brad Waissman – bass; Geoff Dugmore – drums, backing vocals, occasional keyboards	none – UK shows
July 2003	Mike Scott – vocals, guitar, keyboards; Steve Wickham – fiddle; Richard Naiff – piano, flute	Cloud of Sound (2012) one track
July – September 2003	Mike Scott – vocals, guitar, piano; Steve Wickham – fiddle, mandolin, banjo; Richard Naiff – keyboards, flute; Brad Waissman – bass; Geoff Dugmore – drums, backing vocals	none – European shows
October – November 2003	Mike Scott – vocals, guitar, piano; Steve Wickham – fiddle, mandolin; Richard Naiff – piano, organ; Steve Walters – bass; Carlos Hercules – drums	Karma to Burn (2005)
December 2003	Mike Scott – vocals, guitar; Richard Naiff – piano	none – North American shows
January – November 2004	Mike Scott – vocals, guitar, piano; Richard Naiff – piano, organ, keyboards, flute; Steve Wickham – fiddle, mandolin	Cloud of Sound (2012) one track
26 – 28 November 2004	Mike Scott – vocals, guitar, piano; Steve Wickham – fiddle, mandolin; Sharon Shannon – accordion	none – three Irish shows
April – May 2005	Mike Scott – vocals, guitar, piano; Richard Naiff – piano, organ, keyboards, flute; Steve Wickham – fiddle, mandolin	none – one English and one Belgium shows
May 2005	Mike Scott – vocals, guitar, piano; Richard Naiff – piano, organ, keyboards, flute; Steve Wickham – fiddle, mandolin; Anthony Thistlewaite – bass; Fran Breen – drums; with: Leo Moran – guitar, vocals; John "Turps" Burke – guitar, vocals; Sharon Shannon – accordion; Padraig Stevens – percussion, vocals	none – one Irish show each
July 2005	Mike Scott – vocals, guitar, piano; Richard Naiff – piano, organ, keyboards, flute; Steve Wickham – fiddle, mandolin	none – one Irish show each
December 2005	Mike Scott – vocals, guitar, piano; Steve Wickham – fiddle, mandolin; Liam O'Maonlai – keyboards, piano, vocals	none – TV performances only
January – August 2006	Mike Scott – vocals, guitar, piano; Steve Wickham – fiddle; Richard Naiff – piano, organ, keyboards, flute; Steve Walters – bass; Carlos Hercules – drums	Cloud of Sound (2012) one track
August 2006 – March 2007 (sessions only)	Mike Scott – vocals, guitar, piano; Steve Wickham – fiddle; Richard Naiff – piano, organ; Mark Smith – bass; Leo Abrahams – lead guitar; Brady Blade – drums; Jeremy Stacey – drums	Book of Lightning (2007)
February 2007 – February 2009	Mike Scott – vocals, guitar, piano; Steve Wickham – fiddle; Richard Naiff – piano, organ, keyboards, flute; Mark Smith – bass; Damon Wilson – drums	none – European tours
February – May 2009	Mike Scott – vocals, guitar, piano; Steve Wickham – fiddle; John McCullough – keyboards	Cloud of Sound (2012) one track
May – June 2009	Mike Scott – vocals, guitar, piano; Steve Wickham – fiddle; John McCullough – keyboards; Mark Smith – bass; Carlos Hercules – drums	none – Some festival shows
July – November 2009	Mike Scott – vocals, guitar, piano; Steve Wickham – fiddle; John McCullough – keyboards; Mark Smith – bass; Carlos Hercules – drums; Michael McGoldrick – flute; Blaise Margall – trombone; Katie Kim – vocals	none – rehearsals only
December 2009	Mike Scott – vocals, guitar, piano; Steve Wickham – fiddle; Blaise Margall – trombone; Katie Kim – vocals; Sarah Allen – flute; Simon Wallace – keyboards; Joe Chester – guitar, vocals; Ash Soan – drums	none – rehearsals only
January – April 2010	Mike Scott – vocals, guitar, piano; Steve Wickham – fiddle; Blaise Margall – trombone; Katie Kim – vocals; Sarah Allen – flute; Simon Wallace – keyboards; Joe Chester – guitar, vocals; Ash Soan – drums; Marc Arciero – bass; Ruby Ashley – oboe, cor anglais	none – UK shows
June – July 2010	Mike Scott – vocals, guitar, piano; Steve Wickham – fiddle; Simon Wallace – keyboards; Marc Arciero – bass; Paul "Binzer" Brennan – drums	none – European shows
August 2010	Mike Scott – vocals, guitar, piano; Steve Wickham – fiddle; Simon Wallace – keyboards; Marc Arciero – bass; Jeremy Stacey – drums	none – European shows
August – December 2010	Mike Scott – vocals, guitar, piano; Steve Wickham – fiddle; Marc Arciero – bass; Paul "Binzer" Brennan – drums; James Hallawell – keyboards, backing vocals	none – European shows
January – June 2011	Mike Scott – vocals, guitar, keyboards, percussion; Steve Wickham – fiddle; Joe Chester – lead guitar; Katie Kim – vocals; James Hallawell – keyboards, backing vocals; Marc Arciero – bass; Blaise Margail – trombone; Sarah Allen – flute; Ralph Salmins – drums; Kate St John – oboe, cor anglais, saxophone	An Appointment with Mr Yeats (2011)
May – August 2011	Mike Scott – vocals, guitar, piano; Steve Wickham – fiddle; James Hallawell – keyboards, backing vocals; Marc Arciero – bass; Paul "Binzer" Brennan – drums; Melvin Duffy – pedal steel, guitar	none – European tours
September 2011	Mike Scott – vocals, guitar, piano; Steve Wickham – fiddle; James Hallawell – keyboards, backing vocals; Marc Arciero – bass; Paul "Binzer" Brennan or Ralph Salmins – drums; Katie Kim – vocals	none – European tours
November 2011 – March 2012	Mike Scott – vocals, guitar, piano; Steve Wickham – fiddle; James Hallawell – keyboards, backing vocals; Marc Arciero – bass; Melvin Duffy – pedal steel, guitar; Ralph Salmins – drums	none – European tours
April 2012	Mike Scott – vocals, guitar, piano; Steve Wickham – fiddle; James Hallawell – keyboards, backing vocals; Marc Arciero – bass; Ralph Salmins – drums	none – European tours
January – early February 2013	Mike Scott – vocals, guitar, piano; Steve Wickham – fiddle; James Hallawell – keyboards, backing vocals; Marc Arciero – bass; Ralph Salmins – drums; Sarah Calderwood – vocals, flute	none – Australian shows
March 2013	Mike Scott – vocals, guitar, piano; Steve Wickham – fiddle; Jay Barclay – guitar; Daniel Mintseris – keyboards, backing vocals; Malcolm Gold – bass; Ezra Oklan – drums; Elizabeth Ziman – vocals; Chris Layer – flute	none – New York shows
June 2013	Mike Scott – vocals, guitar, piano; Steve Wickham – fiddle; James Hallawell – keyboards, backing vocals; Marc Arciero – bass; Ralph Salmins – drums	none – Ireland show
June – July 2013	Mike Scott – vocals, guitar, piano; Steve Wickham – fiddle; Jay Barclay – guitar; Daniel Mintseris – keyboards; Malcolm Gold – bass; Chris Benelli – drums	none – Canadian and New York shows
July – September 2013	Mike Scott – vocals, guitar, piano; Steve Wickham – fiddle; James Hallawell – keyboards, backing vocals; Marc Arciero – bass; Ralph Salmins – drums	none – European shows
September – October 2013	Mike Scott – vocals, guitar, piano; Steve Wickham – fiddle; Jay Barclay – guitar; Daniel Mintseris – keyboards; Malcolm Gold – bass; Chris Benelli – drums	none – US shows
November – December 2013	Mike Scott – vocals, guitar, piano; Steve Wickham – fiddle; Anthony Thistlethwaite – saxophone, mandolin, harmonica, Hammond organ; Trevor Hutchinson – bass; Ralph Salmins – drums	none
June, August 2014	Mike Scott – vocals, guitar, piano; Steve Wickham – fiddle; Ralph Salmins – drums; Brother Paul Brown – keyboards, backing vocals; Shane Fitzsimmons – bass; Niall C. Lawlor – lap steel guitar; Joe Chester – guitar	none – UK and Japanese shows
July 2014	Mike Scott – vocals, guitar, piano; Steve Wickham – fiddle; Ralph Salmins – drums; Richard Naiff – piano, Hammond organ; Shane Fitzsimmons – bass; Joe Chester – guitar; Niall C. Lawlor – lap steel guitar	none – England and Ireland shows only
December 2014 – late July 2016	Mike Scott – vocals, guitar, piano; Steve Wickham – fiddle, slide guitar; Brother Paul Brown – keyboards, organ, piano, backing vocals; Ralph Salmins – drums; Zach Ernst – lead guitar; David Hood – bass	Modern Blues (2015)
July – August 2016	Mike Scott – vocals, guitar, piano; Steve Wickham – fiddle; Brother Paul Brown – keyboards, organ, piano, backing vocals; Ralph Salmins – drums; Zach Ernst – lead guitar; Neil Mahony – bass	none – final four dates of European tour
June – August 2017	Mike Scott – vocals, guitar, piano; Steve Wickham – fiddle; Brother Paul Brown – keyboards, backing vocals; Bart Walker – guitar; Aongus Ralston – bass, backing vocals; Jon Green – drums; Jess Kavanagh – vocals; Zeenie Summers – vocals	none – European tours
September 2017 – December 2018	Mike Scott – vocals, guitar, piano; Steve Wickham – fiddle; Brother Paul Brown – keyboards, backing vocals; Aongus Ralston – bass, backing vocals; Jess Kavanagh – vocals; Zeenie Summers – vocals; Ralph Salmins – drums	Out of All This Blue (2017)
May – September 2019	Mike Scott – vocals, guitar; Steve Wickham – fiddle; Brother Paul Brown – keyboards, backing vocals; Aongus Ralston – bass, backing vocals; Jess Kavanagh – vocals; Zeenie Summers – vocals; Ralph Salmins – drums; Gavin Ralston – lead guitar	Where the Action Is (2019)
September – October 2019	Mike Scott – vocals, guitar; Steve Wickham – fiddle; Brother Paul Brown – keyboards, backing vocals; Jeff Adams – bass, backing vocals; Ralph Salmins – drums	none – European tours
November 2019 – January 2020	Mike Scott – vocals, guitar; Steve Wickham – fiddle; Brother Paul Brown – keyboards, backing vocals; Aongus Ralston – bass, backing vocals; Jess Kavanagh – vocals; Zeenie Summers – vocals; Ralph Salmins – drums	Life, Death and Dennis Hopper (2025)
August 2020	Mike Scott – vocals, guitar, piano; Steve Wickham – fiddle; Brother Paul Brown – keyboards, backing vocals; Aongus Ralston – bass, backing vocals; Ralph Salmins – drums	Good Luck, Seeker (2020)
September 2021 – February 2022	Mike Scott – vocals, guitar, piano; Steve Wickham – fiddle; Brother Paul Brown – organ, keyboards. backing vocals; Aongus Ralston – bass, backing vocals; James Hallawell – piano, keyboards, backing vocals; Eamon Ferris – drums	none – European tours
February 2022 – April 2025	Mike Scott – vocals, guitar, piano; Brother Paul Brown – organ, keyboards, backing vocals; Aongus Ralston – bass, backing vocals; James Hallawell – piano, keyboards, backing vocals; Eamon Ferris – drums	All Souls Hill (2022); Life, Death and Dennis Hopper (2025)
April – late 2025	Mike Scott – vocals, guitar, piano; Brother Paul Brown – organ, keyboards, backing vocals; Aongus Ralston – bass, backing vocals; James Hallawell – piano, keyboards, backing vocals; Eamon Ferris – drums; Barny Fletcher – vocals	Life, Death and Dennis Hopper (2025)
December 2025 – August 2026	Mike Scott – vocals, guitar, piano; Brother Paul Brown – organ, keyboards, backing vocals; Aongus Ralston – bass, backing vocals; James Hallawell – piano, keyboards, backing vocals; Eamon Ferris – drums	none – European, Australian and New Zealand tours
August 2026 – September 2026	Mike Scott – vocals, guitar, piano; Brother Paul Brown – organ, keyboards, backing vocals; Aongus Ralston – bass, backing vocals; James Hallawell – piano, keyboards, backing vocals; Eamon Ferris – drums; Steve Wickham – fiddle; Steve Earle – vocals, guitar, mandolin; Roar Øien – pedal steel guitar	none – Fisherman's Blues Revue tour

== Bibliography ==
- Scott, Mike (2017). Adventures of a Waterboy – Remastered. Jawbone Press. ISBN 978-1-911-03635-7.
