= The Waterboys discography =

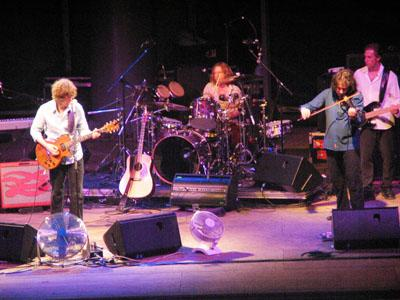
- The Waterboys performing in Antwerp in 2003. L–R: Mike Scott, Geoff Dugmore, Steve Wickham and Brad Waissman
- Studio albums: 16
- EPs: 3
- Live albums: 2
- Compilation albums: 9
- Singles: 29

Discography of releases by the Waterboys and Mike Scott.

== The Waterboys ==
=== Studio albums ===
Title	Album details	Peak chart positions										Certifications
Title	Album details	SCO	EUR	GER	IRE	NED	NZ	NOR	SWE	UK	US	Certifications
The Waterboys	Released: July 1983; Label: Chrysalis (#CCD1541)	—	—	—	—	—	—	—	—	—	—	
A Pagan Place	Released: 2 June 1984; Label: Ensign (#ENCL3)	—	—	—	—	—	40	—	—	100	—	
This Is the Sea	Released: 16 September 1985; Label: Ensign (#ENCL5)	—	70	—	—	4	6	—	—	37	—	UK: Silver
Fisherman's Blues	Released: 17 October 1988; Label: Ensign (#CHEN5)	—	63	—	—	—	15	7	18	13	76	UK: Gold
Room to Roam	Released: September 1990; Label: Ensign (#CHEN16)	—	17	—	—	69	—	11	16	5	180	UK: Silver
Dream Harder	Released: 24 May 1993; Label: Geffen (#GED24476)	—	21	67	7	54	28	3	13	5	171	UK: Silver
A Rock in the Weary Land	Released: 25 September 2000; Label: RCA (#74321783052)	35	—	—	17	—	—	27	51	47	—	
Universal Hall	Released: 9 June 2003; Label: Puck (#74321783052)	59	—	—	54	—	—	24	—	74	—	
Book of Lightning	Released: 2 April 2007; Label: W14 (#1721305)	34	—	—	19	73	—	12	—	51	—	
An Appointment with Mr Yeats	Released: 19 September 2011; Label: Proper (#PRPCD081)	17	—	82	13	—	—	23	—	30	—	
Modern Blues	Released: 19 January 2015; Label: Harlequin and Clown (#CLOWNE1)	10	—	46	10	18	—	10	—	14	—	
Out of All This Blue	Released: 8 September 2017; Label: BMG (#538292480)	3	—	68	5	107	—	—	—	8	—	
Where the Action Is	Released: 24 May 2019; Label: Cooking Vinyl (#COOKCD731)	6	—	65	31	—	—	—	—	21	—	
Good Luck, Seeker	Released: 21 August 2020; Label: Cooking Vinyl (#COOKCD768)	4	—	40	14	53	—	—	—	14	—	
All Souls Hill	Released: 6 May 2022; Label: Cooking Vinyl	10	—	—	—	—	—	—	—	94	—	
Life, Death and Dennis Hopper	Released: 4 April 2025; Label: Sun	—	—	—	65	—	—	57	—	72	—	
"—" denotes items that did not chart or were not released in that territory.

=== Collector's edition studio albums ===
Title	Album details	Peak chart positions		
Title	Album details	SCO	IRE	UK
Fisherman's Blues	Released: May 2006; Label: EMI (#3576732)	79	67	119
Room to Roam	Released: August 2008; Label: Chrysalis (#509992)	—	—	179
"—" denotes items that did not chart or were not released in that territory.

=== Live albums ===
Title	Album details	Peak chart positions		
Title	Album details	SCO	UK	UK Indie
The Live Adventures of	Released: August 1998; Label: New Millennium (#PILOT40)	66	91	10
Karma to Burn	Released: 26 September 2005; Label: Puck (#PUCK4)	—	—	—
"—" denotes items that did not chart or were not released in that territory.

=== Compilation albums ===
Title	Album details	Peak chart positions										Certifications
Title	Album details	SCO	EUR	GER	IRE	NED	NZ	NOR	POR	SWE	UK	Certifications
The Best of The Waterboys 81–90	Released: 30 April 1991; Label: Ensign (#CHEN19)	—	11	52	1	69	32	17	6	19	2	UK: Gold
The Best of The Waterboys	Released: 25 April 1994; Label: Ensign (#CCD1845)	—	—	—	—	—	—	—	—	—	98	
The Secret Life of the Waterboys 81–85	Released: 24 October 1994; Label: Ensign (#CHEN35)	94	—	—	—	—	—	—	—	—	—	
The Whole of the Moon: The Music of Mike Scott and the Waterboys	Released: 6 October 1998; Label: EMI (#CDPP073)	—	—	—	—	—	—	—	9	—	133	
Too Close to Heaven	Released: 24 September 2001; Label: RCA (#74321881522)	74	—	—	—	—	—	—	—	—	111	
The Platinum Collection	Released: 23 October 2006; Label: EMI (#3783462)	—	—	—	55	—	—	—	—	—	—	
In a Special Place – The Piano Demos for This Is the Sea	Released: 28 April 2011; Label: Chrysalis (#5099909841024)	—	—	—	—	—	—	—	—	—	196	
Cloud of Sound	Released: March 2012; Label: Puck (#PUCK6)	—	—	—	—	—	—	—	—	—	—	
Fisherman's Box	Released: 17 November 2013; Label: Parlophone (#2564641330)	68	—	—	67	92	—	—	—	—	84	
1985	Released: 23 February 2024; Label: Chrysalis Records	—	—	—	—	—	—	—	—	—	—	
"—" denotes items that did not chart or were not released in that territory.

=== Extended plays ===
Year	Title	Tracks
2000	Is She Conscious?	Is She Conscious?; Sad Procession; The Faeries' Prisoner; Is She Conscious? (Acoustic); Savage Earth Heart; My Lord, What A Morning
2014	Puck's Blues	November Tale; I Can See Elvis; The Girl Who Slept for Scotland; Destinies Entwined
2019	Out of All This Blue	Out Of All This Blue; Out Of All This Blue (Demo); London Mick (Live); The Whole Of The Moon (Live)

=== Singles ===
Year	Title	Peak chart positions									Certifications	Album
Year	Title	SCO	AUS	CAN	EUR	IRE	NED	NZ	POR	UK	Certifications	Album
1983	"A Girl Called Johnny"	—	—	—	—	—	44	—	—	80		The Waterboys
1983	"December"	—	—	—	—	—	—	—	—	113		The Waterboys
1984	"The Big Music"	—	—	—	—	—	—	—	—	124		A Pagan Place
1984	"Church Not Made with Hands"	—	—	—	—	—	—	—	—	—		A Pagan Place
1984	"All the Things She Gave Me"	—	—	—	—	—	—	—	—	—		A Pagan Place
1985	"The Whole of the Moon"	—	12	71	76	—	19	19	—	26		This Is the Sea
1985	"Don't Bang the Drum"	—	—	—	—	—	—	—	—	—		This Is the Sea
1986	"Medicine Bow"	—	—	—	—	—	—	—	—	—		This Is the Sea
1988	"Fisherman's Blues"	—	54	—	80	13	—	20	—	32	UK: Silver	Fisherman's Blues
1989	"And a Bang on the Ear"	—	—	—	—	1	—	—	—	51		Fisherman's Blues
1990	"How Long Will I Love You?"	—	165	—	—	28	—	—	—	—		Room to Roam
1991	"A Man Is in Love"	—	—	—	—	—	—	—	—	—		Room to Roam
1991	"The Whole of the Moon" (re-issue)	—	107	—	3	2	—	—	—	3	UK: 2x Platinum	The Best of the Waterboys 81—90
1991	"Fisherman's Blues" (re-issue)	—	—	—	—	17	—	—	—	75		The Best of the Waterboys 81—90
1993	"The Return of Pan"	—	127	64	89	28	—	—	10	24		Dream Harder
1993	"Glastonbury Song"	—	—	—	62	12	—	—	3	29		Dream Harder
2000	"My Love Is My Rock in the Weary Land"	—	—	—	—	—	—	—	—	—		A Rock in the Weary Land
2000	"We Are Jonah"	—	—	—	—	—	—	—	—	—		A Rock in the Weary Land
2003	"This Light Is for the World"	—	—	—	—	—	—	—	—	—		Universal Hall
2007	"Everybody Takes a Tumble"	33	—	—	—	—	—	—	—	125		Book of Lightning
2007	"The Crash of Angel Wings"	—	—	—	—	—	—	—	—	—		Book of Lightning
2011	"Sweet Dancer"	—	—	—	—	—	—	—	—	—		An Appointment with Mr Yeats
2012	"Politics"	—	—	—	—	—	—	—	—	—		An Appointment with Mr Yeats
2014	"November Tale"	—	—	—	—	—	—	—	—	—		Modern Blues
2015	"Beautiful Now"	—	—	—	—	—	—	—	—	—		Modern Blues
2017	"If the Answer Is Yeah!"	—	—	—	—	—	—	—	—	—		Out of All This Blue
2017	"Payo Payo Chin"	—	—	—	—	—	—	—	—	—		Out of All This Blue
2020	"The Soul Singer"	—	—	—	—	—	—	—	—	—		Good Luck, Seeker
2022	"Here We Go Again"	—	—	—	—	—	—	—	—	—		All Souls Hill
2025	"Hopper's on Top (Genius)"	—	—	—	—	—	—	—	—	—		Life, Death and Dennis Hopper
"—" denotes items that did not chart or were not released in that territory.

=== Promotional singles ===
- (1989) "World Party"
- (1990) "A Life of Sundays"
- (1993) "Preparing to Fly"

== Mike Scott ==
=== Studio albums ===
Title	Album details	Peak chart positions				
Title	Album details	SCO	EUR	NOR	SWE	UK
Bring 'Em All In	Released: September 1995; Label: Chryslis (#CDCHR6108)	18	44	14	21	23
Still Burning	Released: October 1997; Label: Chryslis (#CDCHR6122)	24	54	18	39	34
"—" denotes items that did not chart or were not released in that territory.

=== Singles ===
Year	Title	Peak chart positions		Album
Year	Title	SCO	UK	Album
1995	"Bring 'Em All In"	38	56	Bring 'Em All In
1995	"Building the City of Light"	46	60	Bring 'Em All In
1997	"Love Anyway"	31	50	Still Burning
1998	"Rare, Precious and Gone"	47	74	Still Burning
"—" denotes items that did not chart or were not released in that territory.

=== Promotional singles ===
- (1998) "Questions"

== Other releases ==
=== DNV singles ===
- (1979) "Death in Venice"

=== Another Pretty Face singles ===
- (1979) "All the Boys Love Carrie"
- (1980) "Whatever Happened to the West?"
- (1980) "Heaven Gets Closer Everyday"
- (1981) "Soul to Soul"

=== Funhouse singles ===
- (1982) "Out of Control"
