= Piper at the Gates of Dawn (disambiguation) =

The Piper at the Gates of Dawn is the 1967 debut studio album by English rock band Pink Floyd.

Piper at the Gates of Dawn may also refer to:

- "The Piper at the Gates of Dawn", seventh chapter of the 1908 book The Wind in the Willows
- "The Piper at the Gates of Dawn", 1984 episode of The Wind in the Willows TV series
- "Piper at the Gates of Dawn", 1976 novella by John Middleton Murry Jr. (as Richard Cowper)
- "Piper at the Gates of Dawn", song by Van Morrison from his 1997 album The Healing Game
- "Piper at the Gates of Dawn", song by the Waterboys from their 2019 album Where the Action Is
