= The Secret Life of the Waterboys 81–85 =

Compilation album by The Waterboys
- Released: 24 October 1994
- Recorded: February 1981–November 1985
- Genre: Rock
- Length: —
- Label: Chrysalis
- Producer: —

The Waterboys chronology
Dream Harder (1993)	The Secret Life of the Waterboys 81–85 (1994)	A Rock in the Weary Land (2000)

Professional ratings
Review scores
Source	Rating
AllMusic	link
NME	8/10
Select	4/5 stars

The Secret Life of the Waterboys 81–85 is an album of outtakes, live tracks and demos by the Waterboys, released by Chrysalis on 24 October 1994.

The tracks on the album were picked by Mike Scott himself. He told Melody Maker in 1994, "Working on the selection with Chrysalis has helped me come to terms with who I was in those days, to learn to accept and appreciate this young man, singing his heart out. I'm reminded how much I love the musicians who passed in and out of the band."

== Critical reception ==
Upon its release, John Mulvey of NME praised The Secret Life of the Waterboys 81–85 as an "impeccable trainspotter's collection" which "dips into the sizeable Waterboys' archive for a relentlessly stirring journey round the fringes of their first three albums". He noted that Mike Scott's "frazzled romantic vision still hits hard even today" and added, "He was so much more stylish and convincing than the rest [the Waterboys' 'Celtic' contemporaries such as U2, Simple Minds and Big Country], always endearingly carried away by the sheer mind-blowing scope of the life he was trying to describe. He made the definitive music for mountain-tops and deserted beaches, for crazed, excitable dreams in adolescent bedrooms."

== Track listing ==
Tracks written by Mike Scott, unless otherwise noted.

1. "Medicine Bow" (Scott, Anthony Thistlethwaite) – 5:07
2. "That Was the River" – 4:45
3. "A Pagan Place" – 5:19
4. "Billy Sparks" – 3:21
5. "Savage Earth Heart" – 7:23
6. "Don't Bang the Drum" (Scott, Karl Wallinger) – 5:57
7. "The Ways of Men" (Scott, Thistlewaite) – 6:36
8. "Rags (Second Amendment)" – 5:15
9. "The Earth Only Endures" (Scott, Traditional) – 5:04
10. "Somebody Might Wave Back" – 2:03
11. "Going to Paris" – 4:39
12. "The Three Day Man" – 3:35
13. "Bury My Heart" – 6:22
14. "Out of Control" – 4:07
15. "Love That Kills" – 6:02
