= The Live Adventures of the Waterboys =

Live album by The Waterboys
- Released: August 1998
- Recorded: January 4 – June 20, 1986
- Genre: Rock
- Length: 106:12
- Label: New Millennium Communications

The Waterboys chronology
Dream Harder (1993)	The Live Adventures of the Waterboys (1998)	A Rock in the Weary Land (2000)

Professional ratings
Review scores
Source	Rating
AllMusic	4/5 stars

The Live Adventures of the Waterboys is a concert recording, released by The Waterboys in 1998. Mike Scott refers to this album as an "unofficial release" or bootleg recording, but praises the recording period as a "classic" period for the Waterboys. Most of the live songs on The Live Adventures... had already appeared on the bootlegs A Golden Day (1991) and Born To Be Together (1992). It is the only Waterboys album on which member Guy Chambers appears.

According to Scott, the album was put out by New Millennium Communications (NMC). Scott claims that New Millennium stopped paying royalties to the band but continued to sell the album. The album is not listed on the band's own discography.

The Waterboys released another, entirely official, live album, Karma to Burn, through Scott's own record label, Puck records, in 2005.

"A Girl Called Johnny" was the first Waterboys single and was originally released on The Waterboys (1983), as was "Savage Earth Heart." "The Thrill Is Gone" was originally released on A Pagan Place (1984). "Medicine Bow", "This Is the Sea", "Be My Enemy", "Old England", "The Pan Within", "The Whole of the Moon" and "Spirit" were originally released on This Is the Sea (1985). "Fisherman's Blues" and "We Will Not Be Lovers" were originally released on the album, Fisherman's Blues (1988), over two years after these live performances. A studio version of "The Earth Only Endures" was released on The Secret Life of the Waterboys 81-85 compilation of outtakes, live tracks and demos in 1994. Studio versions of "Meet Me at the Station", "The Wayward Wind" and "Saints & Angels" were released in the collection "Fisherman's Box" in 2013 - studio recordings from 1986-88. "Death Is Not the End" and "Purple Rain" make their only appearances on a Waterboys album here.

The album features several covers and interpolations of songs by other artists including "Because the Night" by Patti Smith which opens The Pan Within.

== Track listing ==
Tracks written by Mike Scott, unless otherwise noted.

=== Disc one ===
1. "Death Is Not the End" (Bob Dylan) – 4:07
2. "The Earth Only Endures" (Trad. arr. Scott) – 1:42
3. "Medicine Bow" (Scott, Anthony Thistlethwaite) – 2:52
4. "Fisherman's Blues" (Scott, Steve Wickham) – 4:58
5. "This Is the Sea" – 7:02
6. "Meet Me At the Station" (Trad. arr. Scott) – 3:57
7. "We Will Not Be Lovers" – 9:56
8. "The Wayward Wind" (Lebowsky, Newman) – 3:51
9. "A Girl Called Johnny" – 4:44
10. "Purple Rain" (Prince) – 7:22

=== Disc two ===
1. "Be My Enemy" – 4:10
2. "Old England" – 5:41
3. "The Thrill Is Gone/And the Healing Has Begun" (Scott/Van Morrison) – 10:11
4. "The Pan Within including Because the Night" – (Scott/Patti Smith, Bruce Springsteen) – 8:36
5. "The Whole of the Moon" – 5:17
6. "Spirit" – 7:03
7. "Savage Earth Heart" – 9:15
8. "Saints and Angels" (Scott, Wickham) – 5:44

N.B.

- "Spirit" includes a quotation from "The Four Ages of Man" by W. B. Yeats
- "Savage Earth Heart" includes quotations from "Dirt" by Iggy Pop and "Jerusalem" by William Blake

Sources

- Disc one, track 1 @ RTÉ Radio, Dublin, 4 Jan 1986
- Disc one, tracks 2–5 @ Greenpeace Benefit, Royal Albert Hall, London, England, 25 Apr 1986
- Disc one, tracks 6, 7 & 9 @ Radio Clyde, Glasgow, Scotland, 27 Apr 1986
- Disc one, tracks 8 & 10 @ Pink Pop Festival, Geleen, Netherlands, 19 May 1986
- Disc two, all tracks @ Pyramid Stage, Glastonbury Festival, England, 20 Jun 1986

== Musicians ==
- Mike Scott: vocals, acoustic guitar, electric guitar, electric piano
- Anthony Thistlethwaite: sax, mandolin, electric mandolin, piano, backing vocals
- Steve Wickham: fiddle, backing vocals
- Trevor Hutchinson: bass
- Dave Ruffy: drums, backing vocals
- Guy Chambers: piano ("This Is the Sea" only)
