= Orchestra Macaroon =

British musical group

- Genre: Jazz
- Members: Colin Blakey; Steve 'Wee' Brown; Phil Bull; Stephen McNally; Lorne Cowieson; Kieran Gallagher; Paddy Martin; Kim-ho Ip; Ron Blakey; Steve Wickham

Orchestra Macaroon is a British music group formed by Colin Blakey and Philippa Bull in Edinburgh in the 1980s. They combine traditional grooves, Celtic-style melodies, and Jazz improvisations, using various combinations of piano, double-bass, percussion, yangqin, brass, cymbal and bagpipes to make original acoustic instrumental music.

== History ==
The group first played music together in the 1980s in Edinburgh as members of a Scottish punk-folk group named 'We Free Kings'. From 1988 to 1989, Colin Blakey, his friends, including Philippa Bull, and his family gathered a group of 19 musicians called 'The Clan', and recorded his first collaborative album called The Roke, which translates as 'The Rock'.

In 2003, the group emerged from collective musical explorations on Easdale Island, Argyll, Scotland, where they began to develop their sound, combining traditional grooves with Celtic-style melodies and jazz improvisations. These experiments resulted in the recording of a 2004 debut album called Breakfast in Balquhidder. All pieces on the album were composed by Colin Blakey and arranged, mixed, and mastered by Colin Blakey and Philippa Bull on Easdale Island, Argyll. Colin Blakey was the group's songwriter and a key figure in the ensemble.

In describing the band's sound, Fiona Blakey described a 2004 performance as "[pulling] together nine excellent musicians from Scotland, Ireland and China who cover a vast range of instruments including Yang Qin, Clarinet and Flugelhorn", noting "Four different breeds of bagpipes" were used to play music "from solid reggae to Latin American jazz".

In 2021, the group released their second album, entitled Hong Kong to Sligo. It was recorded in 10 different places, from Hong Kong to Sligo, and then mixed and mastered in Argyll, Scotland. The album includes tracks composed by Colin Blakey, with some contributions by Philippa Bull and a collaborative piece by both. The artwork for the album was created by Fiona Blakey. The Living Tradition's Ivan Emke described its sound as traversing "a set of modes that range from a light classical ensemble offering rippling melodies to a community trad session to what could be taken for a Polka Morris band with a dub reggae backbeat."

== Members ==
Breakfast in Balquhidder featured the following musicians:

- Colin Blakey – piano, gaita (Galician bagpipes)
- Ron Blakey – clarinet
- Steve Brown – double bass, electric bass
- Philippa Bull – drum set, percussion, strings
- Lorne Cowieson – flugel horn
- Kieran Gallagher – congas, berimbao, pots, bongos, caxixi
- Kimho Ip – yang qin
- Patrick Martin – highland pipes, uilleann pipes, low whistle
- Stephen McNally – border pipes, gaita (Galician bagpipes)
- Steve Wickham – violin

Hong Kong to Sligo featured the following musicians:

- Colin Blakey – tin whistle, tenor banjo, wooden flute, guitar, violin, Galician pipes, Scottish small pipes, swarmandal tambura, hand-claps
- Philippa Bull – accordion, strings, percussion, hand-claps
- Ben Farmer – accordions
- Carolyn Francis – violins
- Pete French – piano, timbale
- Max Gore – hand pan
- Trevor Hutchinson – double bass
- Kimho Ip – yang qin, cello
- James Mackintosh – drums, percussion
- Stephen McNally – bellows-blown border pipes
- Sam Nicholls – marimba
- Cath Sewell – alto sax
- Sharon Shannon – accordion
- Steve Wickham – violin
- Rab Woods – guitar, dobro, octave mandola

== Discography ==
Albums

- Breakfast In Balquhidder (2004)
- Hong Kong to Sligo (2021)
