= All Souls Hill =

Studio album by The Waterboys
- Released: 6 April 2022
- Studio: The Barn, Sussex; The Bunker, Welwyn; Crow's Nest, Thompson's Station, Tennessee, US; Goyt Valley Sound; Miracle Studios; Nabby Road Studio, Liverpool, England, UK; Ocean Soul Studios; Puck Towers; Rustic Souls; Verlimont Studios, Hampstead, England, UK; Wilbury Road Studios
- Genre: Folk rock
- Length: 40:50
- Language: English
- Label: Cooking Vinyl
- Producer: Paul Brown; Simon Dine; James Hallawell; Mike Scott

The Waterboys chronology
Good Luck, Seeker (2020)	All Souls Hill (2022)	Life, Death and Dennis Hopper (2025)

"In the old days, when I'd be in recording studios, I'd be trying to be at play, but there'd be time pressures, or I'd be working with an engineer, and I'd have to filter everything through their musical consciousness. But when I'm working on my own in my own studio, I'm at play. It's great... [I collaborated with co-producer Simon Dine] strictly by correspondence. He would send me a zip file of twenty one-minute-long instrumentals, and I'd play them, and maybe two of them would suggest melodies or an idea to me, and I'd turn them into a song. Technology allows us to work like that."

—Mike Scott on recording All Souls Hill

All Souls Hill is the fifteenth studio album by British folk rock group The Waterboys, released by Cooking Vinyl on 6 April 2022. It has received positive reviews from critics.

== Reception ==
At AnyDecentMusic?, editors scored this album a 6.5 out of 10, aggregating five reviews. According to the review aggregator Metacritic, All Souls Hill received "generally favorable reviews" based on a weighted average score of 75 out of 100 from seven critic scores.

Editors at AllMusic rated this album 3.5 out of 5 stars, with critic Mark Deming writing that "this is fun, thoughtful, expressive music from a man whose inspiration has yet to run dry". In American Songwriter, Hal Horowitz scored All Souls Hill 3 out of 5 stars, praising the lyrics and vocals: "[Mike Scott] has plenty to say and isn't shy about spewing out a constant stream of verses to make his points: all in his distinctive Scottish brogue and with a propulsive attitude leaving subtlety for others". Writing for The Arts Desk, Joe Muggs rated this work 3 out of 5 stars, characterizing it a "mixed success" criticizing the production choices, but praising Mike Scott's songwriting. Classic Rock's Chris Roberts scored this album 4 out of 5 stars, stating that it "feels like a reset, a detour probing new directions, as befits an album written and produced mostly in collaboration with Simon Dine, who recharged Paul Weller's career". In Glide Magazine, Jim Hynes called this "a bit of both sonic worlds" that mixes the band's classic sound with their hip hop and electronic music trio of studio albums released before this. In Hot Press, Lucy O'Toole wrote that this music finds the group "leaping between genres and ideas as if journeying through a fever dream".

== Track listing ==
All songs written by Simon Dine and Mike Scott, except where noted.

1. "All Souls Hill" – 2:54
2. "The Liar" – 3:28
3. "The Southern Moon" – 4:23
4. "Blackberry Girl" – 2:36
5. "Hollywood Blues" (James Hallawell, Aongus Ralston, Ralph Salmins, and Scott) – 5:26
6. "In My Dreams" – 3:19
7. "Once Were Brothers" (Robbie Robertson) – 5:30
8. "Here We Go Again" – 4:02
9. "Passing Through" (Dick Blakeslee) – 9:16

Bonus edition tracks

1. "Jumpin' Jack Flash" (Jagger–Richards) – 3:52
2. "Painting America White" (Scott) – 2:36
3. "Glastonbury Fayre" (Scott) – 4:33
4. "The Liar" (Mashup) – 3:28
5. "Blackberry Girl" (Mashup) – 2:16
6. "In My Dreams" (Mashup) – 3:05
7. "Once Were Brothers" (Mashup) (Robertson) – 5:34

== Personnel ==
- Mike Scott – vocals, lead and rhythm guitar, sound effects, soundscaping, production
- "Brother" Paul Brown – keyboards, synthesizer, sound effects, guitar on "The Liar", backing vocals on "All Souls Hill", mixing on "Passing Through" at Ocean Soul Studios, production on "Passing Through"
- James Hallawell – piano, organ, Mellotron, guitar, Marxophone, backing vocals, sound effects on "Once Were Brothers", production on "Hollywood Blues" and "Once Were Brothers"
- Simon Dine – sound effects; lead guitar on "The Liar"; production on "All Souls Hill", "The Liar", "The Southern Moon", "Blackberry Girl", "In My Dreams", and "Here We Go Again"
- Mike Brignardello and Aongus Ralston – bass guitar
- Ralph Salmins and Greg Morrow – drums
- Pee Wee Ellis – saxophone on "Hollywood Blues"
- Melvin Duffy – pedal steel guitar on "All Souls Hill"
- Ian McNabb – backing vocals on "Blackberry Girl"
- Barny Fletcher – backing vocals on "Here We Go Again"
- Rob D. Cureton – choir vocals on "Passing Through", choir arrangement on "Passing Through"
- Jason Eskridge – choir vocals on "Passing Through", engineering at Rustic Souls, production on "Passing Through"
- Niki Conley and Kiley Phillips – choir vocals on "Passing Through"
- Charlotte Annand – photography
- Ciaron Bell – engineering at Nabby Road
- Don Jackson – mastering
- Kahn & Selesnik – photography
- Howard Rankin – photography
- Ian James Ross – design

== Chart performance ==
All Souls Hill reached tenth place on the Scottish Singles and Albums Charts and was number 94 in its sole week on the UK Albums Chart.

== See also ==
- 2022 in British music
- List of 2022 albums
