= Out of All This Blue =

Studio album by the Waterboys
- Released: 8 September 2017
- Length: 96:17
- Label: BMG
- Producer: Mike Scott, Paul Brown

The Waterboys chronology
| Modern Blues (2015) | Out of All This Blue (2017) | Where the Action Is (2019) |

Out of All This Blue is the twelfth studio album by the Waterboys, released by BMG in 2017 and produced by Mike Scott. The album reached No. 8 on the UK Albums Chart and No. 3 on the UK Independent Albums Chart.

In a press release for the album, Scott commented: "Out Of All This Blue is 2/3 love and romance, 1/3 stories and observations. I knew from the beginning I wanted to make a double album, and lucky for me – and I hope the listener – the songs just kept coming, and in pop colours."

"If The Answer Is Yeah" was released as the album's first single in July 2017. A music video was filmed for the track, directed by Yoni Weisberg and starring Clive Russell and Sharon Elder. Videos were also made for "Payo Payo Chin" and "Mister Charisma".

== Critical reception ==
Professional ratings
Review scores
| Source | Rating |
|---|---|
| AllMusic | 3.5/5 stars |
| The Express | 4/5 stars |
| The Independent | 4/5 stars |
| Mojo | 3/5 stars |
| PopMatters | 4/10 stars |
| Q | 4/5 stars |
| Record Collector | 4/5 stars |

Upon release, Mark Deming of AllMusic stated: "There's an eclectic variety of sounds and genres here, but the majority of the album finds Scott and company belatedly embracing dance rhythms, and he takes to the funk more comfortably than one might expect. Out of All This Blue is a bold experiment that succeeds, and once again demonstrates the depth and breadth of Mike Scott's talent." Terry Staunton of Record Collector wrote: "The ambition and scope of these songs is undeniably impressive. This is Scott the melting pot throwing everything into the mix, with no restrictions or boundaries as to what pours out of his brightly shining brain. And that's very big of him."

Andy Gill of The Independent considered the album to "continue the funkier direction taken on 2015's Modern Blues". Martin Townsend of The Express described Out of All This Blue as having "an edge and funkiness to proceedings with barely a weak track". Ian Rushbury of PopMatters praised the album's lyrical content but was critical of the number of tracks and "Celtic-Hip-Hop-Indie-Dance" production. He wrote: "The idea of Scott working with hip-hop production techniques is really interesting and there still could be a brilliant Waterboys album using this approach. Unfortunately Out of All This Blue isn't it."

== Track listing ==
Disc one
| No. | Title | Writer(s) | Length |
|---|---|---|---|
| 1. | "Do We Choose Who We Love" | Mike Scott, Freddie Stevenson | 2:58 |
| 2. | "If I Was Your Boyfriend" | Scott | 4:11 |
| 3. | "Santa Fe" | Scott | 3:57 |
| 4. | "If the Answer Is Yeah" | Scott, Zach Ernst | 3:33 |
| 5. | "Love Walks In" | Scott, Steve Wickham | 6:24 |
| 6. | "New York I Love You" | Scott | 7:49 |
| 7. | "The Connemara Fox" | Scott | 5:30 |
| 8. | "The Girl in the Window Chair" | Scott | 2:57 |
| 9. | "Morning Came Too Soon" | Scott | 8:15 |
| 10. | "Hiphopstrumental 4 (Scatman)" | Scott | 2:28 |

Disc two
| No. | Title | Writer(s) | Length |
|---|---|---|---|
| 1. | "The Hammerhead Bar" | Scott | 4:36 |
| 2. | "Mister Charisma" | Scott, Kevin Murphy, Thomas Haugh | 2:04 |
| 3. | "Nashville, Tennessee" | Scott, Paul Brown | 6:00 |
| 4. | "Man, What a Woman" | Scott | 3:16 |
| 5. | "Girl in a Kayak" | Scott, Wickham | 1:23 |
| 6. | "Monument" | Scott | 2:52 |
| 7. | "Kinky's History Lesson" | Scott | 5:19 |
| 8. | "Skyclad Lady" | Scott | 0:57 |
| 9. | "Rokudenashiko" | Scott | 3:06 |
| 10. | "Didn't We Walk on Water" | Scott | 5:52 |
| 11. | "The Elegant Companion" | Scott, Murphy, Haugh | 4:31 |
| 12. | "Yamaben" | Scott | 4:55 |
| 13. | "Payo Payo Chin" | Scott | 3:24 |

Deluxe edition: Disc three
| No. | Title | Writer(s) | Length |
|---|---|---|---|
| 1. | "The Memphis Fox" | Scott | 4:08 |
| 2. | "If the Answer Is Yeah" (alternate version) | Scott | 3:29 |
| 3. | "If I Was Your Boyfriend" (Zeenie Mix) | Scott | 4:00 |
| 4. | "Epiphany on Mott Street" | Scott | 1:55 |
| 5. | "Didn't We Walk on Water" (JessKav Mix) | Scott | 5:33 |
| 6. | "Santa Fe" (instrumental) | Scott | 3:56 |
| 7. | "Payo Payo Chin" (Tokyo Hotel) | Scott | 1:16 |
| 8. | "Return to Roppongi Hills" | Scott | 2:02 |
| 9. | "Nashville, Tennessee" (live) | Scott | 5:36 |
| 10. | "Mister Charisma" (alternate version) | Scott | 3:31 |
| 11. | "So in Love with You" | Scott | 4:36 |

Japanese CD bonus track
| No. | Title | Writer(s) | Length |
|---|---|---|---|
| 14. | "Cuddle Up" | Scott | 3:45 |

== Personnel ==
- Mike Scott – vocals, guitar, piano, keyboards, organ, mellotron, bass, drums, percussion, FX, sampler
- Zach Ernst, Niall C. Lawlor, Max Zaska – guitar
- Brother Paul Brown – synthesiser, organ, piano, clavinet, vocals
- John Hegarty – piano
- Steve Wickham – fiddle, sonics, horns, strings
- David Hood, Aonghus Ralston, Neil Mahoney – bass
- Megumi Igarashi – voice
- Ralph Salmins – drums
- Wild Bill Crivvens – percussion
- Trey Pollard – string, brass and bass arrangement
- The Indivisible Strings – strings
- Kevin Murphy – cello, double bass
- Bill Blackmore – trumpet and flugelhorn
- Thomas Haugh – zither, ukulele, percussion
- Caoimhe Barry, Conor J. Ryan, Dublin Soul Choir, Karen Crowley, Saoirse Duane, Carly Coonagh – choir
- Zeenie Summers, Jess Kavanagh – backing vocals, choir

Production

- Mike Scott – producer, editing
- Stephen Shannon, Kevin Murphy, Thomas Haugh – producers (CD2 tracks 2, 11)
- Dave Montuyrobles – engineer
- Adrian Olsen – recording of string and brass sessions
- Bob Clearmountain – mixing (CD1 tracks 1–2, 5–6, 7–8, CD2 tracks 1, 3, 5–7, 12–13)
- Puck Fingers – mixing (CD1 tracks 3–4, 7, 9–10, CD2 tracks 2, 4–5, 8–11, CD3 tracks 1–8, 10–11)
- Terry Gabis – live desk mixing (CD3 track 9)
- Brother Paul – mixing (CD3 track 10)

Other

- Camille O'Sullivan – cover photography
- Paul Mac Manus, Steve Wickham – additional photography
- Mike Scott – cover concept, additional photography
- Ian Ross – design, artwork

== Charts ==
| Chart (2017) | Peak position |
|---|---|
| Belgian Albums (Ultratop Flanders) | 27 |
| Belgian Albums (Ultratop Wallonia) | 67 |
| Dutch Albums (Album Top 100) | 107 |
| German Albums (Offizielle Top 100) | 68 |
| Irish Albums (IRMA) | 5 |
| Spanish Albums (PROMUSICAE) | 37 |
| Swiss Albums (Schweizer Hitparade) | 78 |
| UK Albums (OCC) | 8 |
| UK Independent Albums (OCC) | 3 |
