= Dick Blakeslee =

American songwriter (1921–2000)

Richard Cleveland Blakeslee (September 15, 1921 – April 7, 2000) was an American professor of English who is best known as the author of the folk song "Passing Through". Quoting from the book by Ronald D. Cohen and Dave Samuelson which accompanies the ten CD set Songs for Political Action, in discussing the People's Songs organization in Chicago:

the most popular song to emerge from Chicago didn't come from the downtown office, but from the city's southside Hyde Park neighborhood. Dick Blakeslee became interested in folk music while attending the University of Chicago. In late 1947 or early 1948, he and Dick Crolley sent a home-cut disc of their compositions to People's Songs in New York. Blakeslee's "Passing Through" was chosen for publication. Pete Seeger learned the song and sang it throughout Henry Wallace's 1948 presidential campaign. Today, "Passing Through" remains an enduring folk standard.

Over the next half century "Passing Through" was recorded by many artists including The Highwaymen, Cisco Houston, Earl Scruggs, Leonard Cohen (on Live Songs,), Valdy and Kind of Like Spitting. It was often sung at union rallies and state fairs and over the years acquired verses not written by Blakeslee, such as a Lincoln verse (the original song included only four verses: Adam, Jesus, Washington, and Roosevelt). It was used as the title song of the 2022 Irish feature film, Passing Through.

Between 1950 and 1958, Blakeslee taught English Literature and Composition at Northwestern University and Wisconsin State University, Stevens Point. In 1958, he took a position at San Fernando Valley State College, now California State University, Northridge, where he taught until his retirement in 1992. During his teaching career he was recognized as a dedicated and gifted teacher. Although he continued to sing and play the guitar for his poetry classes and at parties with friends he did not publish any more songs.

Dick Blakeslee died on April 7, 2000, in Santa Barbara, California. He was survived by his wife Pat, four of his five children, and nine grandchildren.
