= Life, Death and Dennis Hopper =

2025 studio album by the Waterboys

Studio album by The Waterboys
- Released: 4 April 2025
- Length: 60:37
- Label: Sun
- Producers: Brother Paul; Famous James; Mick Puck

The Waterboys chronology
| All Souls Hill (2022) | Life, Death and Dennis Hopper (2025) |

Singles from Life, Death and Dennis Hopper
- 1. "Hopper's on Top (Genius)" Released: 10 January 2025; 2. "Letter from an Unknown Girlfriend" Released: 21 March 2025

Life, Death and Dennis Hopper is the sixteenth studio album by Scottish folk rock group the Waterboys, released by Sun Records on 4 April 2025. The title refers to the actor and director Dennis Hopper. The album features guest appearances from Fiona Apple, Steve Earle, Taylor Goldsmith of Dawes, and Bruce Springsteen.

== Release and promotion ==
The album was announced on 6 January 2025 along with its lead single "Hopper's on Top (Genius)", which was released on 10 January.

The second single, "Letter from an Unknown Girlfriend", features Fiona Apple and was released on 21 March 2025.

== Track listing ==
Life, Death and Dennis Hopper track listing
| No. | Title | Writer(s) | Length |
|---|---|---|---|
| 1. | "Kansas" (featuring Steve Earle) | Mike Scott; Steve Earle | 2:14 |
| 2. | "Hollywood'55" | Scott; Ralph Salmins | 1:34 |
| 3. | "Live in the Moment, Baby" | Paul Brown; Aongus Ralston; Scott; Salmins; Steve Wickham | 2:28 |
| 4. | "Brooke / 1712 North Crescent Heights" | James Hallawell; Scott; Simon Dine | 1:30 |
| 5. | "Andy (A Guy Like You)" | Hallawell; Scott; Dine | 2:23 |
| 6. | "The Tourist" (featuring Barny Fletcher) | Ralston; Scott | 4:01 |
| 7. | "Freaks on Wheels" | Scott; Dine | 0:58 |
| 8. | "Blues for Terry Southern" | Hallawell; Scott | 2:45 |
| 9. | "Memories of Monterey" | Scott | 1:16 |
| 10. | "Riding Down to Mardi Gras" | Hallawell; Scott | 2:20 |
| 11. | "Hopper's on Top (Genius)" | Hallawell; Ralston; Scott; Salmins | 3:09 |
| 12. | "Transcendental Peruvian Blues" | Hallawell; Ralston; Scott; Salmins | 2:24 |
| 13. | "Michelle (Always Stay)" | Hallawell; Scott | 3:07 |
| 14. | "Freakout at the Mud Palace" | Scott; Benjamin Talbott | 3:04 |
| 15. | "Daria" | P. Brown; April Brown | 1:09 |
| 16. | "Ten Years Gone" (featuring Bruce Springsteen) | Scott | 3:32 |
| 17. | "Letter from an Unknown Girlfriend" (featuring Fiona Apple) | Scott | 2:08 |
| 18. | "Rock Bottom" | Scott | 1:16 |
| 19. | "I Don’t Know How I Made It" (featuring Taylor Goldsmith) | Ralston; Scott; Salmins | 2:34 |
| 20. | "Frank (Let's Fuck)" | Hallawell; Scott; Dine | 2:00 |
| 21. | "Katherine" (featuring Anana Kaye) | Irakli Gaprindashvili; Anana Katsadze | 1:31 |
| 22. | "Everybody Loves Dennis Hopper" | Scott | 3:02 |
| 23. | "Golf, They Say" | Hallawell; Scott | 3:31 |
| 24. | "Venice, California (Victoria) / The Passing of Hopper" | Scott; Talbott | 4:04 |
| 25. | "Aftermath" | P. Brown; Scott | 2:37 |
| Total length: | | | 60:37 |

== Personnel ==
=== Waterboys ===
- Mike Scott (Mick Puck) – lead vocals (track 2–6, 8, 10, 11, 13, 16, 21, 22, 25), organ (track 2, 7), "Sundries" (track 2, 6), guitar (track 3, 4, 5, 6, 7, 8, 11, 12, 14, 16, 19, 21, 22), effects (track 4, 9, 20, 21, 24, 25), Mellotron (track 6, 20, 22, 24), tenor guitar (track 16), choir (track 22), guitar solo (track 23)
- Ralph Salmins – drums (track 2, 3, 4, 11, 12, 14, 19, 20)
- Aongus Ralston – bass (track 3, 6, 11, 12, 17, 20, 21, 25), rhythm guitar (track 19)
- Brother Paul Brown – Hammond B3 organ (track 3, 10, 19, 20), wah-wah keys (track 5), Mellotron (track 6), slide guitar (track 10), "Funk Interventions" (track 14, 22), piano (track 15), Wurlitzer (track 19), synthesizers, programming (track 22), pedal steel guitar (track 23), programming (track 25), guitar (track 25)
- Steve Wickham – Fuzz fiddle (track 3)
- Famous James (James Hallawell) – "Sundries" (track 4), slide guitar (track 4, 8, 10), bass, orchestra (track 8, 10, 13), guitar, drums (track 8), backing vocals (track 8, 23), acoustic guitar (track 10, 23), piano (track 10, 11, 12, 13, 23), organ (track 11, 12, 13, 23), Wurlitzer (track 15), lead guitar (track 20)
- Eamon Ferris – drums, tambourine (track 6)
- Jeremy Stacey – drums (track 13)

=== Additional personnel ===
- Steve Earle – lead vocals and guitar (track 1)
- Mickey Raphael – harmonica (track 1)
- Barny Fletcher – backing vocals (track 2, 3, 4, 5, 6, 11, 13, 16, 22, 23)
- Mike Brignardello – bass (track 2, 5, 14, 16, 20, 23)
- Greg Morrow – drums (track 3, 5, 10, 13, 16, 20, 22, 23)
- Simon Dine – keyboard theme, "Archaeology" (track 5), synthesizers, programming (track 20)
- Sugarfoot, Bent Sæther, Hogne Galäen, Roar Øien, Thomas Henriksen, Øyvind Holm – backing vocals (track 6)
- Jim Murray – nylon string guitar (track 10)
- Patti Palladin – "Prototype Woman" (track 11)
- Charles Lapham – voice (track 12)
- Benjamin Talbott – orchestra (track 14)
- Kathy Valentine – "Hippie Girl" (track 14)
- April Brown – Native American Style Flute (track 15)
- Bruce Springsteen – voice (track 16)
- Fiona Apple – piano, vocals (track 17)
- Taylor Goldsmith – voice (track 19)
- Frank Booth – lead vocals (track 20)
- Anana Kaye – piano, keyboards (track 21)
- Irakli Gabriel – guitar (track 21)
- Jess Kav – voice (track 22)
- Benjamin Talbott – trumpet, low horns, guitar, percussion, bells (track 24)

== Reception ==
PopMatters praised the album: "Scott’s ambition has resulted in a musical vehicle that’s blindingly good at times, and Life, Dennis & Death Hopper is a singular addition to the Waterboys’ impressive canon." The Irish Times were similarly positive: "Just like Hopper and Peter Fonda in Easy Rider, they accelerate into the horizon, a duo of rock’n’roll desperadoes fuelled by their love of the open road and its endless possibilities."

== Charts ==
Chart performance for Life, Death and Dennis Hopper
| Chart (2025) | Peak position |
|---|---|
| French Rock & Metal Albums (SNEP) | 57 |
| Irish Albums (IRMA) | 65 |
| Norwegian Albums (VG-lista) | 57 |
| Scottish Albums (Official Charts) | 4 |
| Swiss Albums (Schweizer Hitparade) | 48 |
| UK Albums (Official Charts) | 72 |
| UK Independent Albums (Official Charts) | 4 |
