= Modern Blues =

Studio album by the Waterboys
- Released: 19 January 2015
- Length: 50:51
- Label: Harlequin and Clown
- Producer: Mike Scott, Paul Brown

The Waterboys chronology
An Appointment with Mr Yeats (2011)	Modern Blues (2015)	Out of All This Blue (2017)

Modern Blues is the eleventh studio album by the Waterboys, released on the independent label Harlequin and Clown in 2015. It was produced by Mike Scott, with two tracks being co-produced with Paul Brown. Modern Blues reached No. 14 on the UK Albums Chart and No. 2 on the UK Independent Albums Chart.

Modern Blues was recorded in Nashville. "November Tale" was released as the first single from the album and a music video for the track was directed by Robert Jan Westdijk. The video for "Beautiful Now", the second and final single, debuted on 2 February 2015 on the website of Entertainment Weekly.

== Critical reception ==
Professional ratings
Review scores
Source	Rating
American Songwriter	4/5 stars
Drowned in Sound	4/10 stars
The Guardian	3/5 stars
The Irish Times	3/5 stars
Mojo	4/5 stars
Q	3/5 stars
Record Collector	3/5 stars
The Telegraph	5/5 stars

Upon release, Neil McCormick of The Telegraph commented: "Modern Blues is a rich, aromatic stew of classic rock and beat poetics, with Scott on a quasi-mystical quest to comprehend his own muse and every band member playing out of their skins." Mojo considered the album to be the best Waterboys release since Fisherman's Blues. Hal Horowitz of American Songwriter described Modern Blues as a "rock and roll album" and added: "It's the raw, rocking that keeps you locked on songs that never let their grasp weaken. Scott sounds completely rejuvenated here, [making] Modern Blues one of his most compelling releases."

Paul Mardles of The Guardian felt the album's material contained a blend of "southern soul [and] fiery blues", but "with mixed results". He stated: "The best tracks are a testament to Scott's storytelling skills. But the singer is still a fan and his songs try too hard to mimic the swagger of the artists Modern Blues namechecks." Tony Clayton-Lea of The Irish Times highlighted songs such as "I Can See Elvis", "November Tale" and "Beautiful Now", but felt that "matters get slightly messy with the longer songs".

Ian Abrahams of Record Collector concluded: "...while Modern Blues is far from disagreeable musically, the words will have long-time followers speculating where Scott's at." Dan Lucas of Drowned in Sound felt the album was "pedestrian" and concentrated on "chugging power chords and cheesy guitar riffs". He wrote: "...it's inconceivable that anyone who loves the nuances and the emotional connections forged by the likes of Fisherman's Blues or This Is the Sea could find the same pleasure in something so vapid as Modern Blues."

== Track listing ==
No.	Title	Writer(s)	Length
1.	"Destinies Entwined"	Mike Scott	5:46
2.	"November Tale"	Scott, James Maddock	5:19
3.	"Still a Freak"	Scott	3:59
4.	"I Can See Elvis"	Scott, Jay Barclay	5:48
5.	"The Girl Who Slept for Scotland"	Scott, Freddie Stevenson	4:56
6.	"Rosalind (You Married the Wrong Guy)"	Scott	5:10
7.	"Beautiful Now"	Scott, Maddock	3:58
8.	"Nearest Thing to Hip"	Scott, Maddock	5:43
9.	"Long Strange Golden Road"	Scott	10:23

LP bonus track
No.	Title	Length
10.	"Long Strange Golden Road (Acoustic Demo)"	10:23

Japanese CD bonus tracks
No.	Title	Writer(s)	Length
10.	"Louie's Dead Body (Is Lying Right There)"	Scott	4:13
11.	"Colonel Parker's Ascent into Heaven"	Scott	2:08

== Charts ==
Chart (2015)	Peak position
Belgian Albums Chart (Flanders)	18
Belgian Albums Chart (Wallonia)	66
Dutch Albums Chart	18
German Albums Chart	46
Irish Albums Chart	10
Norwegian Albums Chart	10
Spanish Albums Chart	76
Swiss Albums Chart	56
UK Albums Chart	14
UK Independent Albums Chart	2
US Billboard Independent Albums	36

== Personnel ==
- Mike Scott - vocals, acoustic guitar, electric guitar, lead guitar (tracks 1, 9)
- Paul Brown - organ, piano, keyboards, effects, samples, strings arrangement (track 2)
- Steve Wickham - fiddle
- David Hood - bass
- Ralph Salmins - drums, percussion

Additional personnel

- Steve Hermann - trumpet (track 1)
- Anthony LaMarchina - cello (track 2)
- Kris Wilkinson - viola (track 2)
- David Angell, David Davidson - violin (track 2)
- Zach Ernst - lead guitar (tracks 2, 9)
- Vicki Hampton - backing vocals (tracks 2, 7)
- Felson "Fingers" MacNeal - electric piano (track 3)
- Jay Barclay - lead guitar (tracks 3, 4, 6–7)
- Don Bryant - backing vocals (track 4)
- Jeff Adams - backing vocals (tracks 4, 6, 9)
- Greg Morrow - drums (tracks 4, 6, 8)
- Phil Madeira - steel guitar (track 5)
- Robert Bailey - backing vocals (track 7)
- The Felson MacNeal Implosion - horns (track 8)

Production

- Mike Scott - producer
- Paul Brown - producer (tracks 1, 8), production assistance on backing vocals and string sessions
- Bob Clearmountain - mixing
- Chris Mara, Tom Freitag - engineers
- Mike Stankiewicz - assistant engineer
- Ryan Freeland - additional engineering
- Jim DeMain - mastering
- Amy Brown - mastering assistance

Other

- Sue Meyer - design, layout
- Kahn/Selesnick - photography, typography
- Lisa Best - management
