= Where the Action Is (The Waterboys album) =

Studio album by the Waterboys
- Released: 24 May 2019
- Length: 43:30
- Label: Cooking Vinyl
- Producer: Puck Fingers, Brother Paul

The Waterboys chronology
Out of All This Blue (2017)	Where the Action Is (2019)	Good Luck, Seeker (2020)

Where the Action Is is the thirteenth studio album by the Waterboys, released by Cooking Vinyl on 24 May 2019. It reached No. 21 on the UK Albums Chart and No. 3 on the UK Independent Albums Chart.

Where the Action Is was announced in March 2019, with a lyric video for "Right Side of Heartbreak (Wrong Side of Love)" released the same month. It was followed by music videos for the title track in April and "Ladbroke Grove Symphony" in May. The title track was inspired by the Robert Parker song "Let's Go Baby".

== Reception ==
Professional ratings
Review scores
Source	Rating
AllMusic	3.5/5 stars
The Arts Desk	4/5 stars
Classic Rock	3/5 stars
The Irish Times	2/5 stars
Mojo	4/5 stars
The Skinny	4/5 stars
Uncut	3.5/5 stars

Upon release, Timothy Monger of AllMusic felt the album "continued [Scott's] unexpected dalliance with dance and hip-hop-influenced rhythms" like the preceding Out of All This Blue album, but while "also delivering the more straightforward rock bangers and folk-infused introspections that are his bread and butter". He concluded: "Where the Action Is is another reliably interesting and well-written addition to the band's latter-day renewal." Alan O'Hare of The Skinny considered the album to be one of the Waterboys' "best for a while" which "moves the listener in every way a person can be moved".

Guy Oddy of The Arts Desk concluded: "Scott may no longer be the young man who gave us "Don't Bang the Drum" and "A Girl Called Johnny" but he is far from being a Bono-like pompous windbag and on this evidence, he's not only not finished, but he may yet achieve the same mythic status of some of his own great influences." Zara Hedderman of The Irish Times felt the album "fails to inspire" and "already sounds dated", but noted the Waterboys' "familiar charm" on "In My Time On Earth".

== Track listing ==
No.	Title	Writer(s)	Length
1.	"Where the Action Is"	Robert Parker, Mike Scott, Paul Brown	3:24
2.	"London Mick"	Scott	3:10
3.	"Out of All This Blue"	Scott	3:38
4.	"Right Side of Heartbreak (Wrong Side of Love)"	Scott	4:33
5.	"In My Time On Earth"	Scott, Michael Green	5:44
6.	"Ladbroke Grove Symphony"	Scott	5:14
7.	"Take Me There I Will Follow You"	Scott, Brown	3:59
8.	"And There's Love"	Scott, Simon Dine	2:35
9.	"Then She Made The Lasses O"	Traditional, Robert Burns	2:14
10.	"Piper at the Gates of Dawn"	Scott, Kenneth Grahame	9:13

Deluxe edition: Disc two
No.	Title	Length
1.	"Where the Action Is" (mash)	6:27
2.	"London Mick" (Jess'n'Zeenie Mix)	3:17
3.	"Out of All This Blue" (soul choir)	3:13
4.	"Right Side of Heartbreak" (Box & Vox)	4:13
5.	"In My Time On Earth" (Scott & Wickham Mix)	5:41
6.	"Ladbroke Grove Coda"	3:25
7.	"I Will Follow You Take Me There"	3:52
8.	"And There's Love" (mashtrumental)	3:34
9.	"Then She Made The Lasses O" (mash)	2:10
10.	"Where The Action Is" (reprise)	1:03
11.	"Piper at the Gates of Dawn" (instrumental)	9:03

== Personnel ==
- Mike Scott – vocals (all tracks), electric guitar (1–3, 6, 10), acoustic guitar (4–6), effects (1, 6), piano (6, 9, 10), bass (7), Mellotron (8), keyboards (9)
- Steve Wickham – fiddle (1, 3, 5, 6, 9, 10)
- Brother Paul Brown – Hammond organ (all but 6), synthesizer (1, 8, 10), horns (3)
- Aongus Ralston – bass (1–6, 10)
- Ralph Salmins – drums (1–5, 10), tambourine and shaker (1)
- Jess Kavanagh – backing vocals (1–5, 7)
- Zeenie Summers – backing vocals (1–5, 7)
- Darragh Houston – piano (9)
- Craig Gibsone – humming (10)

== Charts ==
Chart (2019)	Peak position
Belgian Albums (Ultratop Flanders)	146
German Albums (Offizielle Top 100)	65
Irish Albums (IRMA)	31
Spanish Albums (PROMUSICAE)	86
Swiss Albums (Schweizer Hitparade)	56
UK Albums (OCC)	21
UK Independent Albums (OCC)	2
