= Too Close to Heaven =

Compilation album by The Waterboys
- Released: 24 September 2001
- Recorded: July 1986–February 2001
- Genre: Folk-Rock
- Label: BMG International U.K. Razor And Tie Entertainment U.S.

The Waterboys chronology
A Rock in the Weary Land (2000)	Too Close to Heaven (2001)	Universal Hall (2003)

Professional ratings
Review scores
Source	Rating
AllMusic	link

Too Close to Heaven is a collection of outtakes, alternative versions, and unreleased tracks from The Waterboys' Fisherman's Blues period, released September 2001. The album was released as Fisherman's Blues, Part 2 in the United States with five additional tracks in July of that year.

The title track of the album refers to the myth of Icarus. Dave Simpson writes in The Guardian, "Quite how Too Close to Heaven – a song that is easily worthy of either John Lennon or Van Morrison - languished in the vaults for 12 years is a matter for Scott's conscience (and his accountants)". The song has become a favourite at Waterboys concerts.

== Track listing ==
All songs written by Mike Scott, except as noted.

1. "On My Way to Heaven" (Traditional) – 4:01
2. "Higher in Time" (Scott, Anthony Thistlethwaite) – 5:02
3. "The Ladder" – 2:58
4. "Too Close to Heaven" – 12:29
5. "Good Man Gone" – 5:13
6. "Blues for Your Baby" – 5:42
7. "Custer's Blues" – 5:59
8. "A Home in the Meadow" (Sammy Cahn, Alfred Newman) (includes "Patch and MacHugh at the Puck Fair") – 3:13
9. "Tenderfootin'" (Trevor Hutchinson, Scott, Thistlethwaite, Steve Wickham, Kevin Wilkinson) – 5:15
10. "Lonesome Old Wind" – 8:19

=== Fisherman's Blues, Part Two track listing ===
Disc one

1. "On My Way to Heaven" (Traditional) – 4:01
2. "Higher in Time" (Scott, Thistlethwaite) – 5:02
3. "The Ladder" – 2:58
4. "Too Close to Heaven" – 12:29
5. "Good Man Gone" – 5:13
6. "Blues for Your Baby" – 5:42
7. "Custer's Blues" – 5:59
8. "A Home in the Meadow" (Cahn, Newman) – 3:13
9. "Tenderfootin'" (Hutchinson, Scott, Thistlethwaite, Wickham, Kevin Wilkinson) – 5:15
10. "Lonesome Old Wind" – 8:19

Disc two

1. "Higher in Time" (Scott, Thistlethwaite) – 3:39
2. "Ain't Leaving, I'm Gone" (Scott, Thistlethwaite) – 4:24
3. "Lonesome and a Long Way from Home" (Scott, Thistlethwaite) – 3:20
4. "The Good Ship Sirius" (Wickham) – 0:36
5. "Too Close to Heaven" (Live at the Amsterdam Paradiso, November 2001) – 13:16

== Personnel ==
- Mike Scott – vocals, acoustic guitar (1, 2, 4, 5, 8, 10), electric guitar (2, 10), piano (1, 3, 4, 7), electric piano (2, 6, 9, 10), fuzz bass guitar (1), intro/outro bass guitar (7), bouzouki (1), RD500 organ (5), phased organ (6), organ (10), Native American rattle (7)
- Anthony Thistlethwaite – saxophone (1, 2, 4, 6, 8, 9, 10), acoustic mandolin (1), electric mandolin (3), mandolins (8), bass (2), electric piano (7), acoustic guitar (8)
- Steve Wickham – fiddle (1, 3, 4, 6, 9, 10), electric fiddle (2), fuzz mandolin (7), lilting vocal (8 - "Patch..." section)
- Trevor Hutchinson – bass (1, 3, 4, 7, 8, 9)
- Eoghan O'Neill – bass (5)
- John Patitucci – bass (6, 10)
- James Delaney – piano (5)
- Noel Bridgeman – drums (1, 5, 8)
- Peter McKinney – drums (2, 7)
- Kevin Wilkinson – drums (4, 9)
- Jim Keltner – drums (6, 10)
- Jay Dee Daugherty – drums (8 - "Patch..." section)
- Roddy Lorimer – trumpet (1, 9), solo trumpet (7)
- Vinnie Kilduff – uilleann pipes (1), tin whistle (8)
- The Little Big Horns – brass section (7)
- Essie, Sam & Michelle of the London Community Gospel Choir – backing vocals (1)

== Notes and references ==
1. Dave Simpson (3 November 2001). "The Waterboys Nottingham". The Guardian, Rock City. London.
