= Good Luck, Seeker =

Studio album by the Waterboys
- Released: 21 August 2020
- Length: 48:40
- Label: Cooking Vinyl
- Producer: Puck Fingers, Brother Paul

The Waterboys chronology
Where the Action Is (2019)	Good Luck, Seeker (2020)	All Souls Hill (2022)

Good Luck, Seeker is the fourteenth studio album by the Waterboys, which was released by Cooking Vinyl on 21 August 2020.

Good Luck, Seeker was announced on 5 June, with the first song to be previewed from the album being "My Wanderings in the Weary Land". The single "The Soul Singer" was released on 15 July.

== Critical reception ==
Professional ratings
Review scores
Source	Rating
AllMusic	3/5 stars
American Songwriter	3/5 stars
The Irish Times	3/5 stars
musicOMH	4/5 stars
Mojo	4/5 stars
Uncut	8/10 stars

Timothy Monger of AllMusic described Good Luck, Seeker as an "eclectic jumble of wily mysticism, rock & roll romance, oddball tributes, and canned dance beats". He felt the album was "not one of the great Waterboys albums", but "an adventurous one with enough standouts and strange magic to go around". Graeme Marsh of musicOMH commented: "It's astonishing how much ground gets covered on Good Luck, Seeker. Not every track is likely to resonate with every listener, but that's all part of the charm."

Wyndham Wallace of Uncut described Good Luck, Seeker as "an album of passion, wit and spirituality that, like its title, invites us not only to evolve, but to revel in our evolution". Andy Fyfe of Mojo concluded: Good Luck, Seeker may not be the absolute best of Mike Scott's best, but it's well within touching distance."

Hal Horowitz of American Songwriter praised the album's first half of "compact, tight and focused songs" which have a "surprisingly organic, classy and often invigorating effect". However, he felt the second half of the album's focus on spoken prose to be "an acquired taste" for "hardcore Scott lovers only". Eamon Sweeney of The Irish Times described the first half as a "reasonably conventional hybrid of pop, jazz, folk and rock", but felt the second part will "test some listeners, who will hail it as genius or doggerel, depending on where you stand with the Waterboys in the first place".

== Track listing ==
No.	Title	Writer(s)	Length
1.	"The Soul Singer"	Mike Scott	4:43
2.	"(You've Got To) Kiss a Frog or Two"	Scott, Paul Brown	3:49
3.	"Low Down in the Broom"	Traditional	3:05
4.	"Dennis Hopper"	Scott, Brown	3:10
5.	"Freak Street"	Scott	2:36
6.	"Sticky Fingers"	Scott, James Hallawell	0:46
7.	"Why Should I Love You?"	Kate Bush	5:44
8.	"The Golden Work"	Scott, Aongus Ralston, Charles Wiliams	3:02
9.	"My Wanderings in the Weary Land"	Scott, Anthony Thistlethwaite, Jim Keltner	6:48
10.	"Postcard from the Celtic Dreamtime"	Scott, Hallawell	4:11
11.	"Good Luck, Seeker"	Scott, Adrian McNally, Rachel Unthank, Becky Unthank, Niopha Keegan, Chris Price, Sandy Smith, Dion Fortune	2:46
12.	"Beauty in Repetition"	Scott, William James	1:48
13.	"Everchanging"	Scott, Thistlethwaite, Keltner	1:51
14.	"The Land of Sunset"	Scott, Peadar O'Riada	4:28

Deluxe edition: Disc two
No.	Title	Length
1.	"The Soul Singer" (instrumental)	4:40
2.	"(You've Got To) Kiss a Frog or Two" (instrumental)	2:47
3.	"Low Down in the Broom" (guitar and vocal only)	2:58
4.	"Dennis Hopper" (demo)	1:53
5.	"Why Should I Love You?" (instrumental)	5:44
6.	"My Wanderings in the Weary Land" (vocal only)	2:37
7.	"Postcard from the Celtic Dreamtime" (instrumental)	4:11
8.	"Beauty in Repetition" (instrumental)	1:57
9.	"The Soul Singer" (demo)	3:28
10.	"The Land of Sunset" (instrumental)	4:25

== Personnel ==
- Mike Scott – vocals, guitar, piano, keyboards, bass, archeology, fx
- Paul Brown – Hammond organ, piano, keyboards, archeology, programming, fx
- Ralph Salmins – drums, percussion
- Steve Wickham – electric fiddle, acoustic fiddle
- Aongus Ralston – bass
- Jess Kavanagh, Zeenie Summers – backing vocals
- Blaine Harrison – backing vocals (track 3)
- Irakli Gabriel – street voice (track 5)
- David Hood – bass (track 5)
- James Hallawell – organ (track 6), backing vocal (track 7), keyboards (track 10), sonics (track 10)
- Gavin Ralston – sonic guitar (track 7)
- Jeremy Stacey – drums (track 7)
- Mark Smith – bass (track 7)
- Justin Hallawell – distant drums (track 10)
- Brighouse and Rastrick Brass Band, The Unthanks – horns (track 11), sonics (track 11)
- Peadar O'Riada – organ (track 14), tin whistle (track 14)

Production

- Puck Fingers, Brother Paul – producers, mixing
- James Hallawell – additional production (tracks 6, 10)
- Bob Clearmountain – mixing (tracks 1, 7)
- Chris O'Brien – additional engineer (track 1)
- Dave Montuy – additional engineer (track 5)
- Tim Martin, Jack Power – additional engineers (track 7)
- John Cornfield – additional engineer (track 10)
- Lester Salmins – drum recording
- Don Jackson – mastering

Other

- Mike Scott – front cover concept, design
- Ian Ross – design
- B.C. Nowlin – cover painting (Taoseno Sky, oil on canvas)
- Pixabay, Creative Commons, Engin Akyurt, Mike Scott – photography

== Charts ==
Chart (2020)	Peak position
Belgian Albums (Ultratop Flanders)	120
Dutch Albums (Album Top 100)	53
German Albums (Offizielle Top 100)	40
Irish Albums (OCC)	14
Scottish Albums (OCC)	4
Spanish Albums (PROMUSICAE)	65
Swiss Albums (Schweizer Hitparade)	92
UK Albums (OCC)	14
UK Independent Albums (OCC)	3
