= A Rock in the Weary Land =

Studio album by the Waterboys
- Released: 25 September 2000
- Recorded: 1999–2000
- Genre: Rock
- Label: BMG International
- Producer: Mike Scott

The Waterboys chronology
The Live Adventures of the Waterboys (1993)	A Rock in the Weary Land (2000)	Too Close to Heaven (2002)

A Rock in the Weary Land is the seventh studio album by the Waterboys, released in 2000 by BMG International. It was the group's first album after a seven-year break, but mostly continues the hard rock vein of the previous album Dream Harder (1993). The album cover photography is by Steve Gullick.

Recording sessions for the album began in early 1999. It was the first album Mike Scott had recorded without the backing of a record label. Once it was completed, Scott's manager, Philip Tennant, negotiated a deal with BMG and Scott decided to have the album, originally a solo project, released under the Waterboys' name. He recruited some of the musicians who had played on A Rock in the Weary Land as official band members for an upcoming UK tour. The album marked the return of old collaborator Anthony Thistlethwaite after a decade.

== Reception ==
Professional ratings
Review scores
Source	Rating
AllMusic	3/5 stars
Entertainment Weekly	C−
The Guardian	4/5 stars
NME	favourable
Q	6/10

Critic John Mulvey, writing for NME, described the album as "largely excellent" except for "We Are Jonah", which he describes as "appallingly cheery Christian rock". Dave Sleger of AllMusic considered the album to be "ambitious, moody, surreal, and relevant" and one which "incorporates all of the elements and possibilities of modern rock into a uniform, technically updated body of work".

== Track listing ==
All songs written by Mike Scott, unless otherwise noted.

1. "Let It Happen" – 6:20
2. "My Love Is My Rock in the Weary Land" – 8:16
3. "It's All Gone" – 2:15
4. "Is She Conscious?" – 4:41
5. "We Are Jonah" – 5:08
6. "Malediction" – 4:16
7. "Dumbing Down the World" – 3:06
8. "His Word Is Not His Bond" – 3:59
9. "Night Falls on London" – 0:48
10. "The Charlatan's Lament" – 6:52
11. "The Wind in the Wires" – 5:33
12. "Crown" – 7:04

=== Extra tracks release ===
A North American version of the album with two extra tracks was released August 21, 2001.

1. "Let It Happen" – 6:20
2. "The Charlatan's Lament" – 6:52
3. "Is She Conscious?" – 4:41
4. "We Are Jonah" – 5:08
5. "It's All Gone" – 2:15
6. "My Love Is My Rock in the Weary Land" – 8:05
7. "Lucky Day/Bad Advice" (Bill Grant, Scott) – 3:06
8. "His Word Is Not His Bond" – 3:59
9. "Malediction" – 4:16
10. "Dumbing Down the World" – 3:06
11. "The Wind in the Wires" – 5:33
12. "Night Falls on London" – 0:48
13. "Crown" – 7:04
14. "My Lord What a Morning" (Harry Belafonte, Bob Corman, Milt Okun) – 2:27

"My Love is My Rock in the Weary Land" on the American edition is edited compared to the UK edition, playing at a slower speed and featuring numerous differences in the outro.

"Lucky Day/Bad Advice" features a co-writing credit with Bill Grant, whom Scott befriended while living at Findhorn. According to Scott, "Who could make this day again?" was one of Grant's favourite phrases.

=== Japanese editions ===
The standard Japanese release of the album contains the songs "Time, Space and the Bride's Bed", "Trouble Down Yonder" and "Send Him Down to Waco", but not "My Lord What a Morning".

A limited two-disc edition was also issued in Japan by BMG International. The track list of the first disc is identical to the standard track list, above. The track list of the second disc, which is entitled "The Weary Land EP", is as follows:

1. "Lucky Day/Bad Advice" (Grant, Scott) – 3:14
2. "Time, Space, and the Bride's Bed" – 5:38
3. "Trouble Down Yonder" (Anonymous) – 1:05
4. "Send Him Down to Waco" – 7:34

== Singles ==
Prior to the album's release, BMG issued a six-track EP containing the single "Is She Conscious?". The single also contained a video for the song.

1. "Is She Conscious?" – 4:51
2. "Sad Procession" – 7:22
3. "The Faeries' Prisoner" – 2:10
4. "Is She Conscious?" (Acoustic) – 4:31
5. "Savage Earth Heart" (Sound-Desk Recording) – 16:01
6. "My Lord, What A Morning" (Belafonte, Corman, Okun) – 2:27

BMG also issued and almost immediately recalled two singles each (separately packaged) for "My Love is My Rock in the Weary Land" and "We Are Jonah". These are considered collector's items by some Waterboys fans and command high resale prices.

== Personnel ==
- Mike Scott – vocals (all tracks), guitars (track 1, 2, 4, 5, 6, 8, 10, 12), 12-string acoustic guitar (track 3), piano (track 1–5, 11), synthesizer (track 1, 3, 5, 8, 11, 12), organ (track 2, 8, 9, 10), Roland RD500 (track 2, 5, 10, 12), mandolin (track 9), bass (track 9), acoustic guitar (track 11)
- Jeremy Stacey – drums (track 1, 2, 4, 5)
- Thighpaulsandra – keyboards (track 1), synthesizer (track 1, 4, 12), Mellotron (track 2, 12), trumpet (track 5)
- Livingston Brown – bass (track 1, 2, 10–12)
- Steve Orchard – vulture (track 1), space echo (track 8)
- The London Community Gospel Choir – choir (track 2)
- The Joseph Brothers – handclaps (track 2)
- Tresmegistus – Indian harmonium and hand drums (track 2), effects (track 5, 10)
- Dave Ruffy – tambourine (track 2), drum programming (track 9; at the end)
- Mark Smith – bass (track 4, 5)
- Jody Linscott – ocean drums (track 4)
- Claire Nicholson and Robin Scott – backing vocals (track 5)
- Anthony Thistlethwaite – slide mandolin (track 5, 12)
- Richard Naiff – piano (track 5, 11), organ (track 11)
- Cameron Miller – bass (track 8)
- Rowan Stigner – drum programming (track 8, 9)
- Rev Isaiah Shelton – voice sample (track 9)
- Rev E.D. Campbell – voice sample (track 10)
- Paul Beavis – drums (track 10)
- Nick Wollage – organ (track 10)
- Chris Taggart – drums (track 11)
- Kevin Wilkinson – drums (track 12)
- Gilad Atzmon – saxophone, sol (track 12)

== Charts ==
Chart (2000)	Peak position
Norwegian Albums Chart	27
Swedish Albums Chart	51
UK Albums Chart	47
