= Jess Kavanagh =

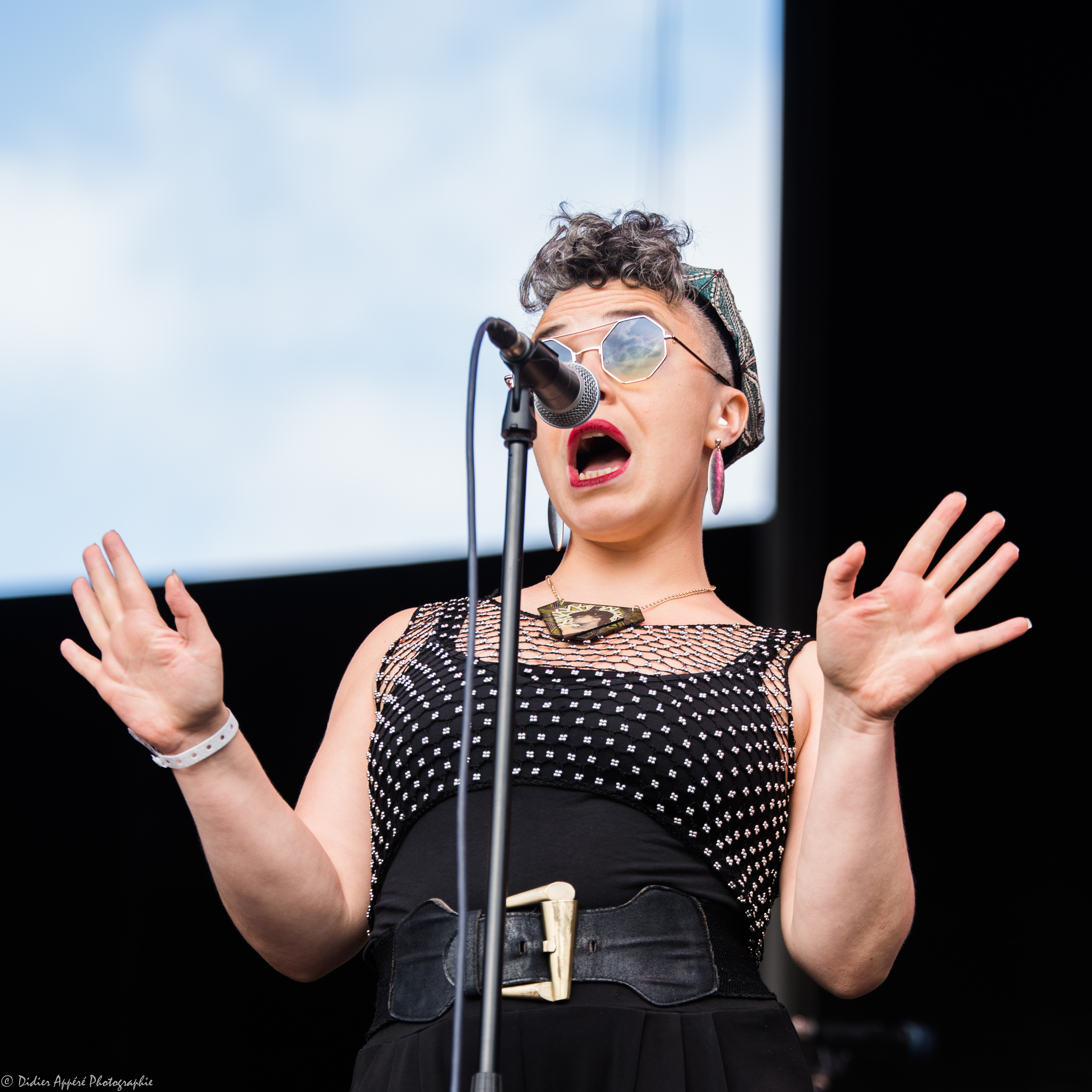
- Kavanagh performing with The Waterboys in 2019

Background information
- Born: Jessica Kavanagh; 1986 (age 39–40); Dublin, Ireland
- Genres: Alternative Soul, R&B, Jazz and Rock
- Occupations: Musician, Songwriter, Session Singer, Playwright
- Years active: 2011–present
- Formerly of: BARQ, The Waterboys
- Website: jesskavmusic.com

Jess Kavanagh (born 1986), also known professionally as Jess Kav, is an active Irish-Nigerian musician, session vocalist and playwright based in Dublin. Recognised as one of the most exceptional vocalists in the Irish music landscape, her career includes extensive touring and recording credits with Billy Idol, The Waterboys, Villagers and Hozier. She began her songwriting career as the front-woman in BARQ and is now writing her debut album as a solo artist. Kav continues to perform, arrange vocals and create interdisciplinary theatre. She was awarded the prestigious Arts Council Ireland Music Bursary 2024 to develop the music for her body of work Fermented Dreams. She transferred this body of work into a solo musical play which premiered at Dublin Fringe Festival 2024 to a sold out run.

== Early life and education ==
Kavanagh grew up in Beaumont, Dublin. Her mother, Liz Kavanagh who was a black woman, activist, avid reader and feminist who musically raised her on several strong female vocalists including, Chaka Khan, Joan Baez and Bonnie Raitt. Liz Kavanagh worked in Whelan’s Dublin and The Purty Kitchen where Jess would have grown up in as a child and teenager. Kavanagh's father, who died when she was 13, was intermittently part of her life. Kavanagh's mother died in 2006 when she was 20.

She studied at The Institute of Contemporary Music Performance, and studied English, media and cultural studies at the Dún Laoghaire Institute of Art, Design and Technology.

== Career ==
Kavanagh maintains her career as a lead vocalist, session musician and vocal arranger within the Irish and International music industries. Kavanagh first joined as a backing vocalist for a band called Creamy Goodness in 2005 where she learned jazz performance and harmony. She first received critical recognition as the lead singer of the Dublin-based alternative agro-soul band BARQ touring and releasing a series of singles until 2020. BARQ's single "Bear" was based on a poem she wrote after the death of her mother, highlighting their complex relationship. She co-wrote other singles such as Optimus Prime which were accompanied by a music video, directed by The Crooked Gentleman and designed by the late lighting designer Conor Biddle. Their single Sassy Mouth was influenced the Repeal The 8th movement. Jess Kav went on to appear on the front cover of the special Hot Press Repeal The Eighth edition. She appeared topless with “mine” written across her chest alongside the motif from Maser’s “Repeal the Eighth” mural, representing bodily autonomy. The cover went on to be exhibited in the National Photography Archive with the President Of Ireland Micheal D Higgins as the honoured guest for the opening event.

Following her time with BARQ, Kavanagh expanded her studio session and touring practice, working with major international acts. She has performed as a touring backing vocalist for rock band The Waterboys, appearing on their world tours and contributing to their studio album releases including Out Of All This Blue, Where The Action Is and Good Luck Seeker. She has performed live with Hozier, appearing on the main stage of Electric Picnic. Her studio session credits include vocal performances for Villagers on their album Fever Dreams, as well as studio and live performances with the jazz-funk collective Zaska. She appeared on tracks with soul artist Omar and Grammy award winning vocalist Ledisi.

In 2024, Kavanagh launched her solo career under the name Jess Kav, releasing her debut single “Genesis” in October 2024, followed by "January Lullaby (Shut Up And Rest)” in January 2025. Combining elements of alternative soul, R&B and electronic production, her original compositions are performed live with a full backing band. As a solo act, she played at Letterkenny Pride, The Improvised Music Company in Dublin and the final iteration of the Body and Soul music festival titled “A.Wake”. Kavanagh has recently written about her frustration with the Irish Music Industry, which had led her to look abroad for her tribe. She continues to write and track new solo material such as an EP she recorded in Chiang Mai in January 2026.

In 2025, Kavanagh joined rock musician Billy Idol as a featured backing vocalist for his stadium tour across South America. She also performs regularly as a vocalist with the RTE Concert Orchestra and remains an active figure in the contemporary soul, rock, indie and jazz live circuits in Ireland and abroad.

=== Theatre and playwriting ===
Kavanagh’s artistic practice includes writing, acting and vocal performance for theatre, frequently combining her musical arrangements to narrative stage works.

In September 2022, Kavanagh joined the Dublin Chapter cast of Hive City Legacy, an award winning multidisciplinary production staged at the Project Arts Centre as part of The Dublin Fringe Festival. The collaborative work led by Australian-based theatre collective Hot Brown Honey and directed by Lisa Fa'alafi, Yami "Rowdy" Lofvenberg and Busty Beats utilised cabaret, satire and music to engage with global and local themes of identity gender and decolonisation. Kavanagh co wrote the ending song “Home” with Deborah Dickenson and Busty Beats.

In Autumn 2023, Kavanagh made her debut on the main stage of The Abbey Theatre, Ireland’s national theatre, in the world premiere of Nancy Harris’s romantic comedy Somewhere Out There You. Directed by Wayne Jordan as a part of The Dublin Theatre festival, Kavanagh performed with the production’s ensemble cast and provided music and live vocals throughout the performance.

In 2024, Kavanagh was awarded an Arts Council Music Bursary to develop the musical body of work for her independent project Fermented Dreams. She subsequently adapted the material into a debut solo musical play of the same name, which premiered at the Dublin Fringe 2024 to a sold out run and was viewed by Kurt Smith (Tears for Fears) and family. Smith stating

"Fermented Dreams was a revelation (…) Jess Kav’s performance is outstanding and not only clearly depicts the struggle, it makes you feel it”

In Spring 2026 Kavanagh collaborates as vocalist with Catherine Young Dance Company for the nationwide tour of CISEACH: An Embodied Manifesto. Funded by The Arts Council Touring Award running across the country of Ireland. Kavanagh co-created the original musical score and provided live vocal performances throughout the tour.
