= A Theatre for Dreamers =

2020 novel

- Cover artwork
- Author: Polly Samson
- Language: English
- Genre: Literary fiction
- Published: 2020
- Publisher: Bloomsbury
- Publication place: United Kingdom
- Media type: Print (hardback)
- Pages: 368
- ISBN: 978-1526600554

A Theatre for Dreamers is a 2020 literary fiction novel by Polly Samson, which entered the Sunday Times Bestseller List at Number 2 upon its April 2020 release. It is a fictionalized account of life on the Greek island of Hydra in the 1960s, featuring real-life characters who lived there at the time, including Leonard Cohen, Charmian Clift and George Johnston.

== Synopsis ==
Set in the early 1960s, A Theatre for Dreamers tells the story of 18-year-old Erica, who escapes from her controlling father in London to live among the colony of writers, painters and musicians on the small Greek island of Hydra. Erica befriends and then observes Hydra's circle of talented but troubled bohemians, including fictionalised versions of famed real-life characters Charmian Clift, George Johnston, Axel Jensen, Marianne Ihlen, Gregory Corso, Gordon Merrick and a young, as yet undiscovered, Leonard Cohen.

== Reception ==
The novel entered The Sunday Times Bestsellers List at Number 2 upon its April 2020 release. The book also attracted favourable reviews, with Alex Preston describing it in The Observer as “a blissful piece of escapism and a powerful meditation on art and sexuality”, Alex Peake-Tomkinson calling it “supremely accomplished” in The Spectator and Suzi Feay for The Financial Times commenting that, “Samson is an intensely sensual writer, conjuring up blue skies, the tang of wild herbs, the vivid splash of bougainvillea... As good as a Greek holiday, and may be the closest we get this year”. The novel was featured in the 2020 Books of the Year lists by the Daily Telegraph, The Spectator, and The Times.

The novel has had editions published in the UK, USA and Canada and has been translated for publication in Estonia, Finland, Germany, Greece, Romania and Turkey.

== Promotion ==
Upon the publication of A Theatre for Dreamers, Samson wrote a piece for The Guardian's Books section about her inspirations for the novel and another about the novel's Hydra setting for The Guardian's Travel section. She also wrote a piece about George Johnston and Hydra for the Financial Times.

The publication was also due to be accompanied by live events in April 2020 in Manchester, Birmingham and London, featuring Samson and her husband, the musician David Gilmour. These events were postponed due to the lockdown caused by the COVID-19 pandemic. Instead, Samson and Gilmour streamed a weekly series of live “Von Trapped Family” broadcasts from a barn at their home, alongside their family. These featured readings and Q&As as well as musical performances from Gilmour. The “Von Trapped Family” were also featured in a special “Lockdown Culture” episode of the BBC Two’s Front Row Late programme.

== Audiobook ==
The audiobook of A Theatre for Dreamers was released by WF Howes on 25 June 2020. The audiobook is narrated by Polly Samson and was produced by David Gilmour, who also provided score music and used the audiobook to debut his first new single in five years, "Yes, I Have Ghosts", featuring the couple's daughter, Romany. The single's title/chorus ("Yes, I have ghosts, not all of them dead.") quotes a line from Samson's book. Upon the audiobook's release, The Times newspaper featured an interview with Samson and Gilmour about the audiobook, as well as a leading article praising the "innovation" of "fusing music with audiobooks" and concluding, "The Gilmour family should be congratulated for pointing the way ahead."

== See also ==
- So Long, Marianne (TV series), a 2024 Norwegian-Canadian eight part biographical drama television miniseries about the 1960s romance
- Marianne & Leonard: Words of Love, a 2019 documentary film directed by Nick Broomfield
