= Marianne Ihlen =

Norwegian muse and partner of Leonard Cohen

- Ihlen shortly before her death in 2016
- Born: Marianne Christine Ihlen; 18 May 1935; Larkollen, Østfold, Norway
- Died: 28 July 2016 (aged 81); Diakonhjemmet, Oslo, Norway
- Other names: Marianne Jensen; Marianne Stang
- Known for: Relationship with Leonard Cohen
- Spouses: Axel Jensen (m. 1958; div. 1962) Jan Kielland Stang (m. 1979)
- Partner: Leonard Cohen (1960–1967)
- Children: 1

Marianne Christine Stang Ihlen (Norwegian: [mɑrɪˈɑ̂nːə ˈîːln̩]; 18 May 1935 – 28 July 2016) (Note: Some sources initially reported her death erroneously as 29 July.) was a Norwegian woman who was the first wife of author Axel Jensen and later the muse and girlfriend of Leonard Cohen for several years in the 1960s. She was the subject of Cohen's 1967 song "So Long, Marianne".

== Early life ==
Ihlen was born on 18 May 1935 in Larkollen, Norway. During the Second World War Ihlen's father contracted tuberculosis which required a long period of treatment at the Mesnali sanatorium near Lillehammer. Her younger brother, Nils, when he was two suffered from tuberculosis for more than a year during which, while her mother nursed her son and husband, Ihlen spent time with her maternal grandmother in Larkollen.

As the 1950s progressed the family's financial situation became strained as Ihlen's father lacked the lung capacity to work for an entire day in court, as a result of his tuberculosis treatment. This put pressure on the couple's relationship and forced her mother to take a job in the licence office of the national broadcasting company. Ihlen attended Berle Girls' School.

== Meets Axel Jensen ==
While her father had hoped that she would become a doctor or lawyer, Ihlen did not know what she wanted to do, so opted to take business studies at the Oslo Municipal Trade School. Graduating at the age of 19 Ihlen took a number of jobs, including as secretary at an attorney's office in Oslo, Kristiania Shoe Store, the Norsk Bygdekino cinema, and in 1956 at the Save the Children charitable organization. She also briefly worked as an au pair in Newcastle, in England.

In 1954, while travelling in a car with one of her girlfriends along Majorstua Street, they were approached by budding 22-year-old Norwegian avant-garde writer Axel Jensen, who invited her to a party. Once at the party Ihlen thought he was fascinating and was spellbound by everything he said. Jensen subsequently telephoned her and they met up in Dovrehallen, a student pub at which they committed to a relationship. Jensen took whatever work he could find to support himself as he wrote short stories for newspapers and magazines. He introduced Ihlen to works by Nietzsche, Carl Jung and Ouspensky in an effort to expand her horizons.

In 1955, Jensen self-published his first book Dyretemmerens kors. Ihlen clashed with her father over Jensen, curfews, and housework, and when she was twenty he refused her permission to spend Easter with Jensen and their friends in a mountain cabin. Her father thought that Jensen, who came from a broken home, lacked a good education, a job and a place of his own to live, unlike the children of his middle class friends and acquaintances.

When she was 22, Ihlen was inspired while reading Henrik Ibsen's The Wild Duck with her mother's cousin who was an actress, to also become an actress. She then studied to take the entrance examination to the National Academy of Theatre in Oslo, but lost her nerve partly due to her parents' objections and did not take the examination.

In 1957, Jensen's novel Ikaros – ung mann i Sahara (Icarus – A Young Man in Sahara) was published by Henrik Groth of Cappelen, and was highly praised. Ihlen thought they had a committed relationship with long held plans to travel to Greece, but later that same year, one evening, Jensen out of the blue introduced her to another young woman at the Theatre Café, and informed Ihlen that there would be no trip to Greece as he was leaving tomorrow with the other woman for Egypt. Ihlen stormed out and made her way in a state of shock back to where she was staying, only to be awakened at 4 o'clock by Jensen at the doorstep saying, "We're going to Greece! It's you I want to travel with!"

== Hydra ==
In mid-November, over her parents' objections, the reunited couple departed by train for Greece, with plans to be away for a year, with Jensen intending to spend the time writing. Disembarking from the train in Hamburg, they purchased a second-hand Volkswagen Beetle. Driving south they visited Venice and Rome before passing through Yugoslavia into Greece. On the way south from Thessaloniki, Ihlen was forced to have an emergency operation for appendicitis in the village of Lamia. Ihlen remained in hospital for a week recovering, and it was not until December that they reached Athens, where they stayed with their friends Per and Else Berit who had moved there the year before. Jensen had originally intended that they rent an apartment in Athens, but their friends suggested they could live more cheaply on the island of Hydra, which was three hours away by ferry. After visiting Delphi the couple drove down to Ermioni in the Peloponnese, where their landlady at the place they stayed allowed them to park their car in her garden. It was from there that they took a ferry to Hydra.

After initially renting, Jensen used part of an advance of 40,000 kroner that he had received from Groth for his next book to purchase a house on Kala Pigadia Street on Hydra for approximately US$2,500. After making repairs to the house, the couple were left with just over US$2,000 on which to live until Jensen's next book was published, with the house offered as security for one year's line of credit at a local grocery store.

The house was simple with an outside toilet and electricity for only one hour in the evening and one hour in the morning. Otherwise, they used paraffin lamps. The couple soon became a component part of the foreign community on the island, and friends with Charmian Clift and her husband, novelist George Johnston. Some months later the Swedish writer Göran Tunström arrived on the island and rented a house close by, becoming a friend. Ihlen remained on Hydra when it was necessary for Jensen to travel back several times to Norway to capitalise on the success of his novel, Ikaros – ung mann i Sahara.

On one of these trips Jensen met a woman called Sonja, who he became besotted with after five days of acquaintance. Upon his return to Hydra in late 1958, he informed Ihlen that the woman was coming to the island and that his relationship with her was over. In response Ihlen packed a bag and left to stay in Athens for a few days, with the idea of getting a job there.

She was approached by Eileen Barclay who was married to Sam Barclay, an heir to Barclays Bank. They had a schooner, the Stromie Seas, which they chartered out to wealthy individuals over the summer. Eileen was eager to have a break from her position as cook and hostess on the yacht and spend time with her new lover. She suggested that Ihlen replace her on the schooner where she could also be a nanny for the couple's seven-year-old son. The next day she reported to Barclay at Piraeus, and spent the next six weeks working on the schooner as it sailed among various Greek islands, including Santorini. Thrown together, Barclay and Ihlen had a romantic relationship during this period.

At the end of the charter Ihlen returned to stay with Per and Else Berit in Athens, who observed that the experience had transformed her into a serene and more confident person, who, while she still loved Jensen, was prepared to live without him.

Meanwhile, Jensen had been on a six week long drinking binge as he had purchased a ticket for Sonja to travel to join him in Greece, only to find that she had sold the ticket and had kept the money.

== Marriage ==
By chance, while Jensen was in Athens he met the "new" Marianne, falling in love with her again. He immediately asked her to marry him and she accepted. They married on 22 October 1958 in the Anglican Church in Athens, against her parents' wishes. They then returned to their house on Hydra. While Jensen had by now delivered the first draft of his novel to Cappelen, to bring in extra money both Ihlen and Jensen worked over the spring of 1959 on Sam Barclay's schooner as it carried a group of English students around the Greek islands.

With his new novel Line, printed and approaching its publishing date, both Ihlen (who was by now pregnant) and Jensen travelled to Oslo, where both were able to catch up with family and friends. Once the novel was published to great acclaim, Jensen used the incoming money to travel in October with Ihlen, Per and Else Brent to Stockholm, where via friends they purchased a Karmann Ghia. Due to Jensen being unable to drive due to a drunk driving conviction, Ihlen drove the car back to Oslo. It was while they were back in Oslo that Ihlen's father died in November 1959. Ihlen's son Axel Joachim was born on 21 January 1960 in Oslo. Ihlen temporarily moved in with her mother, as a week after his son's birth Jensen travelled back to Hydra in order to avoid paying Norwegian taxes. Four months later Ihlen and Axel Joachim followed.

== Leonard Cohen ==
While Ihlen had been in Norway, Leonard Cohen had moved to Hydra, renting a house for US$14 a month. While he had noticed her following her return, they had never been introduced. Ihlen described their meeting in Katsikas' store in early 1960:

I was standing in a shop with my basket waiting to pick up bottled water and milk. And I was crying in front of a Greek lady. Then, there he was (Cohen) standing in the door way with the sun behind him, and you don’t see the face, just the contours, and so I hear his voice saying 'would you like to join us? Come into the sun. We're sitting outside'. He was wearing a beautiful little sixpence cap. When my eyes met his, I felt it throughout my body.

After finishing her shopping Ihlen joined Cohen and three or four other foreigners at a table outside for a period before returning home. By now Ihlen was aware that her husband had a new lover, the American painter Patricia Amlin, who he was openly carrying on with.

With their relationship deteriorating, Jensen decided to leave on his sailboat, a Norwegian BB11 that he had had transported by ship to Piraeus. A friend, while visiting Athens, reported back to Ihlen that he had seen Jensen and Amlin together, which finally convinced her that her marriage was finished. Jensen later confirmed in a May 1960 letter to her that he had left Hydra by himself rather than openly with Amlin, in order to spare Ihlen the public humiliation. Rather than return to Norway, Ihlen decided to stay on Hydra with her baby son, partly due to her deepening friendship with Cohen.

Soon after Ihlen's and Jensen's separation, Amlin was badly injured when she crashed Jensen's Karmann Ghia near Athens and was flung out of the car, breaking many bones and developing gangrene, which required amputation of a thumb. Jensen struggled with the situation and three days later telegrammed Ihlen asking for her help. At Cohen's urging, Ihlen left her son with him and travelled to Athens, where she maintained a vigil by Amlin's bed allowing Jensen to rest. After three days she returned to Hydra. After Jensen left her, Ihlen received small financial payments from Jensen's publisher, Cappelen. Jensen allowed her to live in the house and following their formal divorce a year later transferred ownership to her and their son. After taking Amlin back to America and travelling around Mexico with John Starr Cooke, Jensen returned to Hydra in the summer of 1960 and rented a house in which to write. Jensen remained friendly with both Ihlen and Cohen. Eventually Jensen was expelled from Hydra in 1962 following a drunken altercation with a policeman, after which Ihlen never saw him again, though they continued to correspond.

The Karmann Ghia had survived Amlin's crash practically undamaged. It had been registered in Ihlen's name, but there was a need for it to be returned to Norway in order to avoid having to pay import duties, which Ihlen would struggle to pay. She was reluctant to make the long journey with her son. As Cohen's money was running out and he needed to return to Canada to make some more, he offered to accompany her, before continuing across the Atlantic. Plans changed when by chance Ihlen came across some SAS Norwegian aircrew while they were relaxing in Hydra. Believing them to be trustworthy, she impulsively asked if they would take her six-month son back to his grandmother in Oslo, rather than him having to endure a long drive across Europe. They agreed and a few days later in August Ihlen and Cohen delivered the baby to the aircrew at Athens airport.

After receiving a telegram from her mother that her son had arrived safely, Ihlen and Cohen returned to Hydra where in September of that year, having received an inheritance from his grandmother, Cohen purchased a whitewashed L-shaped house for US$1,500. Ihlen divided her time between her house and Cohen's, though they took small breaks to explore the mainland together. In November 1960 Ihlen and Cohen drove to Norway, exploring Europe as they went. Cohen then travelled on from Oslo to Canada.

Ihlen signed her legal separation papers in February 1961, though her divorce would not be finalised for another year. To support herself she took a job as a production assistant and substitute script girl on the film Tonny released in 1962. Cohen eventually scraped together sufficient funds and sent Ihlen a telegram in the autumn of 1961: "Have house. All I need is my woman and her son. Love Leonard."

She and her now 18-month-old son joined him in Montreal, where Cohen increasingly became a surrogate father to Axel Joachim. The three lived in Montreal for one year before returning to Hydra in 1963. While she had been away Ihlen had rented out the house on Kala Pigadia Street, in which she returned to live before soon moving in with Cohen. They engaged an elderly neighbour, Kyria Sophia, to help around the house while Cohen wrote, and Ihlen looked after her son and Cohen. Ihlen and Cohen grew their own marijuana, with Ihlen occasionally mixing it into meatballs.

After two years of work, Cohen completed his novel The Favourite Game, which was published in October 1963. Leaving her son with his grandmother before he joined her, Ihlen spent a couple of months in Paris where she tried to obtain work before travelling on to Oslo to attend the funeral of her paternal grandmother. Meanwhile, Cohen had been in London and Canada, returning to Hydra where once again he created a family unit with Ihlen and her son. Cohen attempted to gain a living through his writing while his muse was a housewife and lover. Ihlen occasionally modelled for Hydra-based artists, among them Anthony Kingsmill and Marcelle Maltais, whose painting of her resides in the Musée national des beaux-arts du Québec.

Cohen returned to Montreal for a short period before he obtained passage on a cargo ship and re-joined Ihlen, who was then visiting Oslo. Cohen wrote to his friend Irving Layton that Ihlen:

... seems to have endured and ruined the women I've known after her and I've got to confront her mystery in the snow. She is so blonde in my heart!

Once the couple were back on Hydra Cohen commenced work in 1964 on his second novel Beautiful Losers. During this writing period he would often leave Ihlen on Hydra while he returned to Canada for short periods to work and replenish his funds, as well as provide readings of his poetry. The only time they travelled as a family was a short trip to London in the spring of 1965.

By the time Beautiful Losers was published in 1966 to disappointing sales and initially unsympathetic reviews, Cohen had come to the realisation that he would not be able to make a living as a writer. At the same time, his relationship with Ihlen had become strained, due to the time he had spent away from her in Hydra. To improve their relationship, the couple moved to Montreal together with Ihlen's son where they took up residence in an apartment at 3657 Aylmer Street. Ihlen was able to obtain a job in a women's clothing boutique on Sainte Catherine Street. By this time folk music was becoming popular, especially in New York. On visits to the city, Cohen had heard both Bob Dylan and Joan Baez perform.

After some time back in Montreal, Cohen decided to head south in search of work as a studio musician in Nashville. While passing through New York he was introduced to singer Judy Collins, who after hearing some of his songs encouraged him to continue. By now having run out of money, he returned to Ihlen in Montreal, instead of continuing on to Nashville. It was back in Montreal that Cohen wrote Suzanne, which was taken up by Collins and became his first successful song. Deciding in the winter of 1966 that she needed a break from Cohen, Ihlen took Axel Joachim along on a visit to her friend John Starr Cooke near Oaxaca in Mexico. It was here that for the only time in her life Ihlen tried a few LSD trips, in an attempt to provide some insight into her dilemmas.

Believing that its unstructured regime would be beneficial, Ihlen sent seven-year-old Axel Joachim to board at experimental Summerhill School in England. There were children of a number of other Hydra expats there. However, Axel Joachim was unmoored by the experience, and became desperate for his mother. He spent a year or two there. He then had no further real schooling until at the age of 12 he was sent to a strict Swiss boarding school.

In 1968, while living alone on Hydra, Ihlen met 20-year-old Nick Broomfield, with whom she had a nearly year-long relationship, during which she was instrumental in encouraging him to become a documentary maker and to make his first film, Who Cares?, in 1971.

Axel Joachim returned to his mother and was nine years old when the pair moved to New York where Cohen was then based, with Ihlen hoping to re-establish their relationship. Cohen would not allow her to stay. He claimed that he considered her too pure, and wished to shield her and her son from his current debauched, bohemian lifestyle. Consequently, Ihlen established a separate residence with her friend Carol Zemel who had recently moved to the city on Clinton Street on the Lower East Side. Ihlen and her old friend Jean Marc Appert earned money as street vendors of toy cats, made on the spot out of steel wire and wool yarn.

Cohen and Ihlen remained close, with him paying her rent and her son's boarding schools in England and Switzerland as well as his airfare. He took her for visits to the Chelsea Hotel, and to concerts, and introduced her to Andy Warhol, Joni Mitchell and Buffy Sainte-Marie. As Cohen's fame increased, other women would ring Ihlen's apartment in an attempt to get to him. While they drifted apart as lovers, Cohen would continue to support Ihlen and provide whatever help he could. Their relationship finally ended in 1972 after the birth of Cohen's son Adam, who was born from his relationship with Suzanne Elrod.

While in the city Ihlen undertook body-oriented psychotherapy with psychotherapist Alexander Lowen. After a year in New York, Ihlen and her son left to divide their time between her family's home in Larkollen and Hydra. While living in Cohen's house in Hydra in 1972 with her now 12-year-old Axel Joachim, she was confronted by Suzanne Elrod with her son Adam Cohen. Elrod wanted the house for herself, so Ihlen was forced to move out.

== Return to Norway ==
In 1973 Ihlen returned with her son to live a permanent, more structured life in Oslo, though she and Cohen stayed in touch periodically for the rest of her life. Whenever he performed in Scandinavia, she visited him backstage. When either of them spoke of their love affair, it was always in the fondest terms.

Ihlen took a position with Norwegian Contractors, who specialized in the construction of offshore oil platforms, where she worked in the personnel and foreign departments. She remained employed in the oil industry for the rest of her working life.

Axel Joachim was taken on a trip to India at the age of 15 by his father, Jensen, and given LSD. As he grew older, he developed psychiatric problems and after 1979 spent a large part of his life institutionalized in Norway. The 2020 documentary Little Axel explored his life.

While employed at Norwegian Contractors Ihlen met engineer Jan Kielland Stang, who had three daughters from a previous marriage and whom she knew from her youth. They married in 1979. Following their marriage they continued to live in Oslo.

Ihlen continued to regularly visit Hydra for holidays. Late in her working life, Ihlen assisted actress Juni Dahr by making travel arrangements for her when she toured her solo shows Joan of Arc - Vision through Fire and then Ibsen Women - Put an Eagle in a Cage in Europe, Japan and the United States in the late 1980s and early 1990s. She developed an interest in Tibetan Buddhism via the Centre for Growth in Denmark and spent time painting.

== Illness and death ==
She was diagnosed with leukemia in late July 2016. Her close friend Jan Christian Mollestad contacted Cohen to tell him Ihlen was dying. He wrote a poignant email to her, which is often misquoted by the media and others. However, the widely circulated version of the email was based on an inaccurate verbal recollection by Mollestad which was then transcribed in a radio interview. The actual email obtained through the Leonard Cohen estate reads:

Dearest Marianne,

I’m just a little behind you, close enough to take your hand. This old body has given up, just as yours has too. I’ve never forgotten your love and your beauty. But you know that. I don’t have to say any more. Safe travels old friend. See you down the road. Endless love and gratitude.

your Leonard

She died aged 81 on 28 July 2016, in Oslo. Cohen died later that year on 7 November 2016.

== Legacy ==
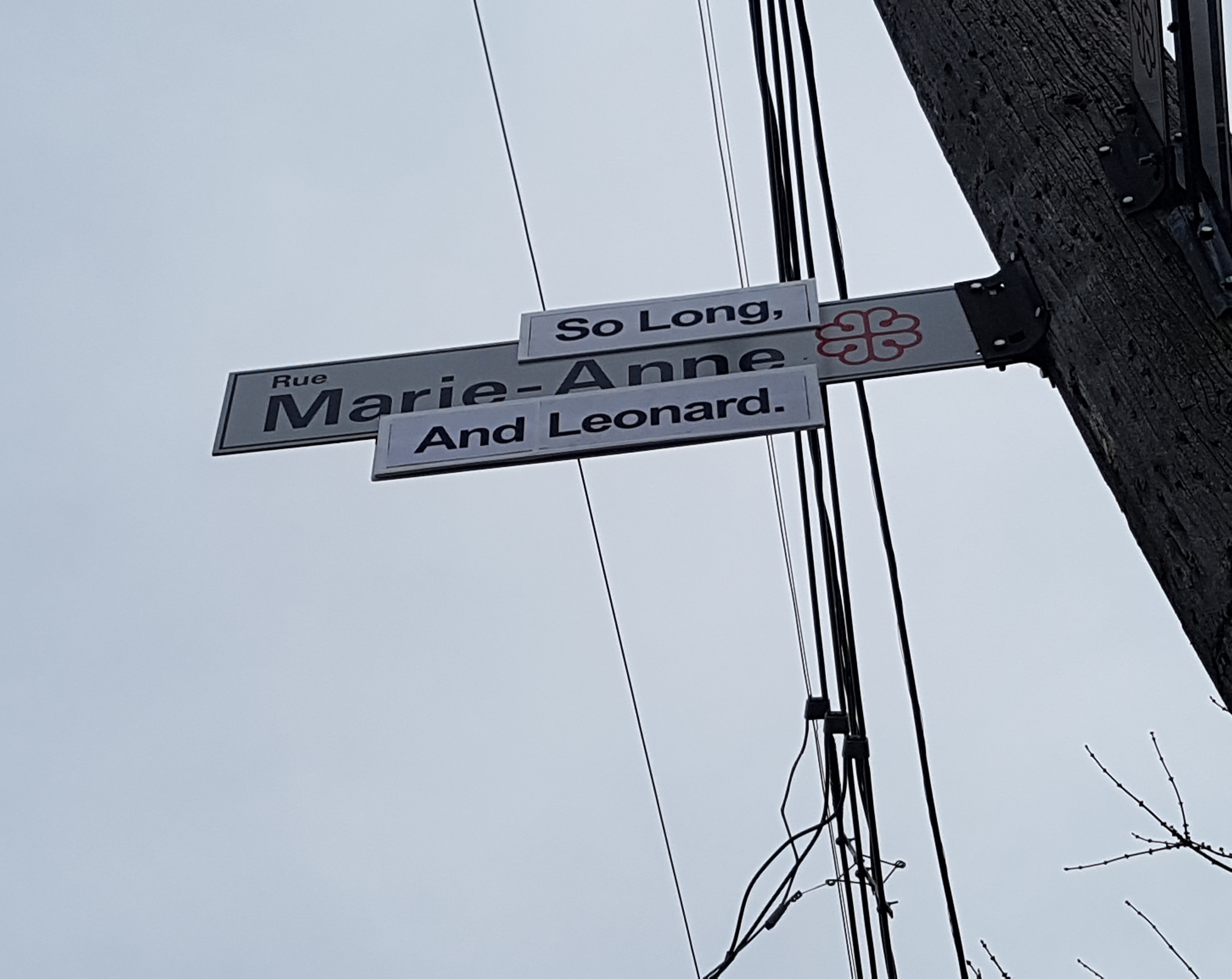
Modified street name sign in November 2016 at the intersection of Marie-Anne Street and Saint-Dominique Street in Montreal following the death of Leonard Cohen

Cohen dedicated his third volume of poetry, Flowers for Hitler, to Ihlen, with the poems For Marianne and Waiting for Marianne, dealing specifically with her. Cohen's 1972 volume of poetry The Energy of Slaves also refers to Ihlen in Welcome Home. She also directly inspired many of his songs, in particular "Bird on the Wire"; "Hey, That's No Way to Say Goodbye"; and "So Long, Marianne" on his first two albums, Songs of Leonard Cohen (1967) and Songs from a Room (1969). The back sleeve of Songs from a Room features a famous photograph of her at Cohen's typewriter, draped in a white towel in their house on Hydra.

From a window in that home, Ihlen once saw a bird perched on a newly installed telephone wire and remarked to Cohen that they looked like musical notes; she suggested he write a song about it. "Bird on the Wire" was the result, one of his most successful songs, with the opening lines:

Like a bird on the wire,

Like a drunk in a midnight choir,

I have tried, in my way, to be free.

About his song "So Long, Marianne" Cohen commented on the back cover of Greatest Hits, 1976:

I began this on Aylmer Street in Montreal and finished it a year or so later at the Chelsea Hotel in New York. I didn't think I was saying goodbye but I guess I was. She gave me many songs, and she has given songs to others too. She is a Muse. A lot of people I know think that there is nothing more important than making a song. Fortunately, this belief arises infrequently in their conversation.

Initially, the title line read "Come on, Marianne" and was meant as an invitation to allow changes in their lives. Even before the separation from Ihlen, Cohen replaced the encouraging "come on" with the farewell greeting "so long". The song "Moving On" from Cohen's posthumous 2019 album Thanks for the Dance is also a tribute to Ihlen.

Norwegian journalist Kari Hesthamar won the 2006 Prix Europa for her 2005 radio documentary about Ihlen. In 2008, Hesthamar published her biography of Ihlen, So Long, Marianne. Ei Kjærleikshistorie; ECW Press published the English translation So Long, Marianne: A Love Story in 2014.

In 2014, in a review of Lana Del Rey's third album, Ultraviolence, Alexandra Molotkow compared Del Rey's persona of surrender to Ihlen's account of her search for independence. Molotkow described Del Rey as an artist, fully in control of her career, who, paradoxically, had chosen a performing persona as a weak and helpless female, who sought to surrender to powerful men. According to Molotkow, who had just read Hesthamar's recently translated biography of Ihlen, even though Ihlen had the reality of the fantasy Del Rey shows in her videos, of the woman socially and economically reliant on a man, Ihlen has described how she became fully independent. According to Molotkow, Hesthamar's book is "the story of a remarkable woman who was a muse – who has, until now, appeared in history as a man's idea – and how she found herself. Often, the book reads as a caution against giving up your power."

Her life and relationship with Cohen was depicted in Nick Broomfield's 2019 documentary film Marianne & Leonard: Words of Love. In June 2019 a collection of more than 50 love letters written by Leonard Cohen to Ihlen were sold at auction by Christie's for $876,000 with many selling for more than five times their pre-sale estimates. One letter sold for $56,250.

Ihlen was a character in Polly Samson's 2020 novel A Theatre for Dreamers about the bohemian circle on Hydra in the 1960s.

The television series So Long, Marianne, coproduced by Norway's NRK and Canada's Crave, stars Thea Sofie Loch Næss as Ihlen and Alex Wolff as Cohen.

The band Bastille included a song titled "Leonard & Marianne" in their fifth studio album & ('Ampersand') about the relationship between Cohen and Ilhen.
