= So Long, Marianne (TV series) =

2024 Norwegian-Canadian television series

- Genre: Biographical drama
- Created by: Ingeborg Klyve; Tony Wood
- Written by: Øystein Karlsen; Jo Nesbø
- Directed by: Øystein Karlsen; Bronwen Hughes
- Starring: Alex Wolff; Thea Sofie Loch Næss
- Countries of origin: Norway; Canada
- Original languages: Norwegian & English
- No. of episodes: 8

Production
- Running time: 45-47 minutes

Original release
- Network: NRK; Crave
- Release: 22 September 2024 (Norway); 27 September 2024 (Canada)

So Long, Marianne is a 2024 Norwegian-Canadian eight part biographical drama television miniseries about the 1960s romance between Canadian writer and musician Leonard Cohen and Marianne Ihlen, the Norwegian woman who inspired Cohen's song "So Long, Marianne". The series ends with Cohen becoming a popstar and his first tour in 1970.

The series was created by Ingeborg Klyve and Tony Wood, and is written by Øystein Karlsen and Jo Nesbø.

== Main cast ==
- Alex Wolff as Leonard Cohen
- Thea Sofie Loch Næss as Marianne Ihlen
- Jonas Strand Gravli as Axel Jensen
- Anna Torv as Charmian Clift
- Noah Taylor as George Johnston
- Peter Stormare as Irving Layton
- Macha Grenon as Masha
- Éric Bruneau as Robert Hershorn
- Simon Lööf as Göran Tunström

The supporting cast includes Macha Grenon as Cohen's mother, Éric Bruneau as Cohen's cousin Robert Hershorn, and Kim Lévesque Lizotte as Monique Mercure, as well as Robin L'Houmeau, Raphael Grosz-Harvey, Miranda Calderon, Tatiana Latreille, Ryan Bommarito, Emily Lê, Frank Fontaine, Christina Bennington, Megan Jonker, Sonia Berube, Rob Stewart, Chip Chuipka, Howard Bilerman, Avi Bendahan and Patrick Watson in supporting roles.

== Production ==
A co-production of Norway's NRK and Canada's Crave, the series entered production in spring 2023, with shooting in Montreal, Oslo and the Greek island of Hydra.

The series was approved by Cohen's family and they were consulted throughout all stages of development.

=== Casting ===
Wolff's music background played a role in his casting, with Karlsen explaining:

"I wanted a professional musician and singer because I wanted our Leonard to really sing, to really play Cohen’s music, to not have to fake that." He continued: "I knew Alex from his music [as part of the sibling pop duo Nat & Alex Wolff]. His mother’s an actress and writer. His father’s a pianist. So he comes from that same Cohen-like artistic background."

Wolff spent 18 months preparing for the role, becoming Cohen:

“I think I did everything I could. At certain points, it got disgusting the amount I threw myself at it because it felt really good to allow him into my emotional orbit,” said Wolff. "Oystein said to me: ‘Do you want to be Canadian all the time? Do you want to be singing in this? Do you want to smoke real cigarettes? And the answer was yes to all three of those."

Because of his full immersion in the role--wanting to be called 'Leonard' when not filming-- he had the reputation on the Greek island of Hydra for being a bit mad.

== Release ==
After having screened in competition at the Series Mania television festival in France on 15 March 2024. the series premiered on 22 September 2024 (the day after Leonard Cohen would have turned 90) in both Norway, on broadcaster NRK, and Germany on ARD's streaming service "ARD Mediathek". It was released in Canada through streaming service Crave on 27 September 2024. It also streamed in the United Kingdom on ITVX and on SBS On Demand in Australia.

== Reception ==
The series was praised by Scott Roxborough of The Hollywood Reporter for "treating its subjects not as great artists in the making, but as ordinary messed-up 20-somethings." He also praised Wolff's performance, stating that it "goes beyond cover band imitation to feel lived in. He wears his Leonard like a rumpled raincoat. The series truly comes alive in the moments when Wolff sings, as Cohen, on camera."

Wolff also watched hours of interview footage with Cohen and read "every single line" he wrote: “Reading the words, they start to become your words, and they feel so delicate, so precise and elegant, it feels so good, it tastes good to say them. If there was ad-libbing [in the series] it was never to say a Cohen thing, it was more to just feel your way into it." Much of the dialogue in the series is improvised.

== See also ==
- A Theatre for Dreamers, a 2020 literary fiction novel by Polly Samson
- Marianne & Leonard: Words of Love, a 2019 documentary film directed by Nick Broomfield
