= Shanti Devi (disambiguation) =

Shanti Devi (1926–1987) was an Indian woman who claimed to remember her previous life.

Shanti Devi may also refer to:

- Shanti Devi (Odisha politician) (died 2009), Queen of Dharakote
- Shanti Devi (Uttar Pradesh politician) (born 1937), Lok Sabha member for Sambhal
- Shanti Devi (social worker) (1934–2022), peace worker in Rayagada, Odisha
- Princess Shanti Singh of Nepal or Shanti Rajya Lakshmi Devi (1940–2001), Rani of Bajhang
- SY Shanti Devi, a schooner owned by Axel Jensen
