= Tore Bernitz Pedersen =

Norwegian illustrator and comics artist (1935–2015)

- Born: 26 January 1935; Oslo, Norway
- Died: 17 April 2015 (aged 80)
- Occupation: Illustrator
- Notable work: Doktor Fantastisk

Tore Bernitz Pedersen (26 January 1935 - 17 April 2015) was a Norwegian illustrator and comics artist. He was born in Oslo and was educated at the Norwegian National Academy of Craft and Art Industry and the Regent Street Polytechnic Art School in London. He created the comics strip Doktor Fantastisk, in cooperation with Axel Jensen, Roar Høiby and Terje Brofos, which was published in the newspaper Dagbladet, and he has been illustrator for the newspapers Aftenposten and Fredriksstad Blad. Among his book illustrations are Alf Prøysen's songbook Fra Hompetitten til bakvendtland, historical books by Georg Apenes, and Olav Angell's books about the city of Oslo.
