= Berömda män som varit i Sunne =

1998 book by Göran Tunström

- First edition
- Author: Göran Tunström
- Language: Swedish
- Published: 1998
- Publisher: Albert Bonniers förlag
- Publication place: Sweden
- Awards: August Prize of 1998

Berömda män som varit i Sunne (lit. Famous Men Who Have Visited Sunne) is a 1998 novel by Swedish author Göran Tunström about Sunne. It won the August Prize in 1998.

== Plot ==
The book is about Stellan Jonsson Lök, a merchant who is commissioned to write a text for an anniversary book. The text should be about famous men who have been to Sunne. Lök, who is also an autograph hunter, begins his work with great enthusiasm, but the more he digs, he soon finds the people behind these famous men. Among other things, the astronaut Ed Odin who comes back to his hometown to bury his mother, the artist Pihlgren who can no longer paint, the priest Cederblom who no longer believes. All the research also leads to Lök starting to find himself.
