= Protestfestival =

Festival in Kristiansand, Norway

The Protest Festival of Kristiansand, Norway, is a protest against powerlessness and indifference, in support of commitment and action. A protest against standardisation of society and one-track market thinking and a feeble notion of tolerance.

A program in the spirit of Axel Jensen, Jens Bjørneboe and Henrik Wergeland.

The festival is supported by the Norwegian state cultural department with an annual Nkr 250.000 grant.
