= Clean Straw for Nothing =

1969 novel by George Johnston

- First edition
- Author: George Johnston
- Language: English
- Series: Meredith trilogy
- Publisher: Collins, Australia
- Publication date: 1969
- Publication place: Australia
- Media type: Print (Hardback & Paperback)
- Pages: 318 pp
- Preceded by: My Brother Jack
- Followed by: A Cartload of Clay

Clean Straw for Nothing (1969) is a Miles Franklin Award-winning novel by Australian author George Johnston. This novel is a sequel to My Brother Jack, and is the second in the Meredith trilogy of semi-autobiographical novels by Johnston.

== Story outline ==
In real life, Johnston abandoned a conventional career in Australia in journalism, and moved to a Greek island which was a magnet at the time for artists and writers. The novel similarly tells the story of a journalist (David Meredith) who relocates to a Greek island, but fails to find the answers he seeks.

Meredith's relationship with his second wife, Cressida, closely parallels Johnston's second marriage to Charmian Clift. On the eve of Clean Straw for Nothing's publication, Clift overdosed on barbiturates in Sydney. In a posthumously-published essay, My Husband George, Clift wrote: "I do believe that novelists must be free to write what they like, in any way they liked to write it (and after all who but myself had urged and nagged him into it?), but the stuff of which Clean Straw for Nothing is made is largely experience in which I, too, have shared and ... have felt differently because I am a different person..."

== Critical reception ==
Ian Hicks, writing in The Canberra Times at time of the original publication of the novel, indicates that it is a worthy successor to My Brother Jack: "To say that it repeats the success of Jack is to be guilty of extreme understatement; it is a magnetic book that grasps the reader's attention and holds it firmly, with no apology...As of now we have two fine novels setting before us the dilemma of the Australian search for something beyond and intrinsically better than a crushing rush for materialistic gain. What can have happened, we are being asked, to the soul of a country once so much identified by its demand for social advance and by its belief in the virtue that was mateship."

== See also ==
- My Brother Jack
- A Cartload of Clay
- 1969 in Australian literature

== Notes ==
The novel takes it title from the old London pub lines: "Drunk for a penny. Dead drunk for tuppence. Clean straw for nothing."

Kay Keavney interviewed the author for The Australian Women's Weekly at the time of its publication.
