= Arvid Anseth =

Norwegian ophthalmologist

Arvid Anseth (29 January 1925 – 3 August 2006) was a Norwegian ophthalmologist.

Anseth was born in Bærum. He finished his secondary education in 1943, took the Candidate of Medicine degree at Lund University in 1947 and the Doctor Medicinae degree at Lund in 1961, after two years as a research fellow in Boston, Massachusetts. Anseth was a docent at Lund University from 1962 to 1971, a professor at the University of Tromsø from 1971 to 1977, a professor at the Faculty of Medicine of the Trondheim from 1977 to 1980, and a professor at the University of Oslo/Rikshospitalet from 1980 to 1989. Among others, he operated on Olav V of Norway for a cataract in 1986.

Anseth was married, and resided in Larkollen in his later life. Anseth died in August 2006.
