= Oslo International Poetry Festival =

The Oslo International Poetry Festival (OIPF) was held on June 14 to 16th, 1985 and also August 14 to 20th, 1986.

Participants were, among many other:

- Octavio Paz
- Sonia Sanchez
- James Baldwin
- Andreij Voznesinsky
- Gherasim Luca
- R. D. Laing
- Roger Greenwald
- Jan Verner-Carlsson
- Protima Bedi
- Gherasim Luca
- Rolf Jacobsen
- Horst Baumann
- Piet Hein
- Albert Nordengen
- Åse Kleveland
- Karin Krogh
- Noel Cobb
- Lawrence Ferlinghetti
- William Irwin Thompson
- Karl Pribram
- Wayne Garcia
- Joolz
- Randall Meyers
- Hazel Henderson
- Patricia Leventon
- Arne Næss
- Francis Huxley
- Robert Anton Wilson
- Adele Getty,
- Ntozake Shange
- Ustad Nazim Ali Khan
- Sirje Kaerma
- A.T.H. Ljungberg
- Tomas Tranströmer
- Göran Tunström
- Bodil Lindfors
- Jarkko Laine
- Ellen Einan
- Warren R. Carlstrom
- Arne Nordheim
- Rói Patursson
- Anthony Barnett
- Robert Haraldsen
- The Fugs
- Erik Bye
- Russell Hoban
- Walter Ahart
- Mathew Collins
- Frode Alnæs

The Norwegian author Axel Jensen was chairman of OIPF in 1985 and in 1986. In the committees were also:

- Olav Angell
- Lasse Tømte
- Halfdan W. Freihow
- Thomas Bay
- Robert Haraldsen
- Jan Christian Mollestad
- Cecilie Sverre
- Kjell Finstad
- Kristin Hansen
- Randi Mikkelsen
- Tone Hovland
- Sven Bjørk
- Pelle Gustavsen
- Erik Varjord
- Ellen Lange
- Pratibha Jensen
- Bjørn Stendahl
- Wayne Garcia
- Khalid Thathad
- Marte Askeland
- Geir Giske
- Trygve Åslund
- Tom Knutzen
- Ikhlaque Chan,
- Klaus Fjellberg.

Robert Anton Wilson dedicates his book "Wilhelm Reich in Hell","...to all political prisoners, wherever they may be."' and writes: "I recently had the honor of writing the statement of principles that concluded the 1986 International Poetry Festival in Oslo, Norway, which was signed by all the participating artists and scientists. That statement is printed below, to transmit again a signal of solidarity with all victims of tyranny:

We, the undersigned participants in the 1986 Oslo International Poetry Festival, hereby deplore all governments which presently hold in prison artists, writers or scientists condemned for no crimes except creative thought. We affirm our solidarity with all these imprisoned sisters and brothers and send them this signal of our concern and love. We call on all governments to grant amnesty to all such persons and we call on all citizens everywhere to join us in protest against the barbarous practise of attempting to cage the mind and strangle the creative spirit.
