= My Brother Jack =

Novel by George Johnston

- First edition
- Author: George Johnston
- Cover artist: Sydney Nolan
- Language: English
- Publisher: Collins
- Publication date: 1964
- Publication place: Australia
- Media type: Print (Hardback & Paperback)
- Pages: 384 pp
- Followed by: Clean Straw for Nothing

My Brother Jack is a classic 1964 Australian novel by writer George Johnston. It is part of a trilogy centering on the character of David Meredith. The other books in the trilogy are Clean Straw for Nothing and A Cartload of Clay. It is commonly studied for English literature subjects in Australia.

== Overview ==
This semi-autobiographical novel, definable as a roman à clef, follows the narrator, David Meredith, through his childhood and adolescence in interwar Melbourne through to adulthood and his prominent career as a journalist during World War II, to his life on a Greek island in the 1950s and 60s.

David's childhood and early life are influenced heavily by the destructive presence of his father, psychologically ruined by his experiences in the Great War. His father, cruel, increasingly withdrawn, is a catalyst for the escapes which both David and Jack have to make, each in their own way.

The novel has a central theme using contrasts between David and his older and more "typically Australian", brother, Jack. Where David is tentative, even passive, as a boy, Jack is fearless, engaging head-on with the world around him. "You've got to have a go, nipper," Jack says to David early in the novel.

As they get older, Jack exhibits solid qualities of loyalty and grit while David betrays friendships and family in his progress to success.

David's friend at The Morning Post in Melbourne, Gavin Turley, sums up this aspect of David's character, and indeed the journey the book describes, in Chapter 12. First in a comment to Helen:

One thing you should know and always remember. There is no guarantee in him, my dear. There is no guarantee.

And later in explanation to David himself:

...you will have to go on and on in your own strange solitary way, too far from your own wilderness ever to go back to it, beating and bashing and cheating and striving towards some goal which up to now, I swear, you have never yet glimpsed.

The life of David Meredith has many parallels with the life of his creator, George Johnston. They were contemporaries, both growing up in the interwar years in suburban Melbourne, in families tainted by the horror of war, both finding writing to be their métiers. Both had short first marriages, both fell in love with younger women who became second wives, both had successful careers as war correspondents. Both lived bohemian lives on a Greek island. And of course, both had a brother called Jack.

In reviewing the novel in 2014, fifty years after its original publication, Paul Daley in The Guardian asks the reader to "look beyond the obvious autobiography and the family roman à clef, and discover the novel’s real strength – a daring iconoclasticism that challenges pervasive assumptions about Australian character, values and suburban complacency."

My Brother Jack is nothing if not a powerfully candid post-war cultural and social commentary. But it’s also a timeless allegory about the foibles of selfish ambition and material security and a dissertation on what Johnston saw as the vacuousness of suburban satisfaction. It challenges the “suburban dream”, another of the great cultural pillars – the primary one being the Anzac legend – upon which Australian character supposedly stands.

== Awards and nominations ==
My Brother Jack won the Miles Franklin Award in 1964.

== 1965 TV series ==
The book was serialised for the Australian Broadcasting Corporation in 1965 by Charmian Clift, who was Johnston's wife. It featured actors Ed Devereaux, Nick Tate and Richard Meikle. It was released on DVD in ABC's 'Classic Drama' series in 2006.

=== Cast ===
- Ed Devereaux as Jack Meredith
- Nick Tate as David Meredith
- Richard Meikle as Dud Rosevear
- Stewart Ginn as Vern
- Jeanie Drynan
- Peter Sumner

== 2001 TV series ==
It was adapted again in 2001 by John Alsop and Sue Smith. Ken Cameron directed, and the cast included William McInnes, Angie Milliken, Claudia Karvan, Jack Thompson and Felix Williamson with Simon Lyndon and Matt Day as the brothers.

The series was released on DVD, as a two-part film, by Umbrella Entertainment (DAVID0351), also in a two-disc package with Bad Blood as "Great Aussie Icons: Jack Thompson" (DAVID1019).

=== Cast ===
- Simon Lyndon as Jack Meredith
- Matt Day as David Meredith
- William McInnes as Mr Meredith
- Angie Milliken as Minnie Meredith
- Claudia Karvan as Cressida Morley
- Jack Thompson as Bernard Brewster
- Felix Williamson as Sam Burlington
- Raelee Hill as Sheila
- Ellouise Rothwell as Helen Midgeley
- Robert Menzies as Gavin Turley
- Sullivan Stapleton as Young Joe
- Reg Gorman as Clarrie

== See also ==
- 1964 in Australian literature
