= A Cartload of Clay =

Book by George Johnston

- Author: George Johnston
- Language: English
- Series: Meredith trilogy
- Genre: Fiction
- Publisher: Collins
- Publication date: 1971
- Publication place: Australia
- Media type: Print
- Pages: 159pp
- Preceded by: Clean Straw for Nothing
- Followed by: –

A Cartload of Clay (1971) is the last and unfinished novel by the Australian author George Johnston. It is a sequel to My Brother Jack and Clean Straw for Nothing, the third in the Meredith trilogy of semi-autobiographical novels by Johnson.

== Story outline ==
The novel follows David Meredith over the period of several hours as he contemplates his life, the death of his wife and his own impending end.

== Critical reception ==
John Lleonart in The Canberra Times put the book into its context: "A Cartload of Clay is a mellow, often distinctly melancholy autobiographical essay. Johnston had intended it to be a novel but the fact that it is structurally incomplete does not detract from it. The absence of a contrived ending is, indeed, a factor in the book's impact as a human document...There is no doubt that the Johnston trilogy has reached a plane where neither the most determined parochial masochism and self-revelation can harm it. And even if, while writing this last painful episode, he was over-conscious about not being well-known outside Australia, that too may serve a worthwhile purpose. Any Australian writer who in future can produce work of the quality of the Johnston trilogy will surely know he does not have to apologise for it to anybody."

== See also ==
- 1971 in literature
