= Tage Åsén =

Swedish graphic artist and painter

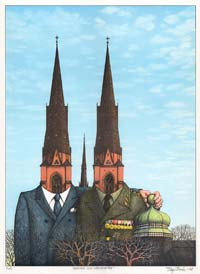

Tage Åsén (born 1943) is a Swedish graphic artist and painter.

He works in a technique which has been described by art critics as super-realistic or hyper-realistic. The motif in his paintings is a critical "social surrealism" that is predicated on a dark and wry humour. His paintings have been used as covers for a number of books and music albums since his first exhibition (1968).

Most notable among these is perhaps the covers for the Swedish rock group Samla Mammas Manna, ranging from Måltid (1972) to Dear Mamma (2002).

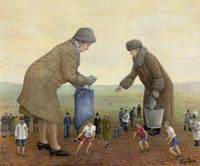

He also made the book cover paintings of De heliga geograferna (1973) and Guddöttrarna (1975), the first two novels about Sunne by the Swedish writer Göran Tunström.

In 2018, Tage Åsén exhibited at Mårbacka.

The Swedish band Långfinger acquired the rights from Åsén to use one of his paintings for the cover artwork of their album Pendulum which was released 15 March 2024 through the record label Welfare Sounds & Records.
