= SY Shanti Devi =

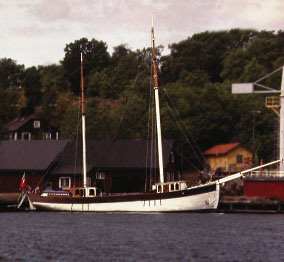
SY Shanti Devi in 1983, at Mälaren Shipyard in Stockholm, Sweden

Shanti Devi was a schooner, later rigged as a ketch. From about 1974, it was owned by Norwegian author Axel Jensen and his Indian wife Pratibha who lived on board for many years until 1990. The couple bought it in Waxholm. The ship was built in 1905 at Sjötorps shipyard near lake Vänern in Sweden, and originally named Zeus, but later registered in Gibraltar as SY Shanti Devi under the Jensen's ownership. It was sold when Jensen became seriously ill (with ALS), and was a few years sailing privately under the Norwegian flag until it mysteriously sank outside Arendal in October 2012. Several attempts to salvage the ship have failed.

This type of ship was originally built for cargo transport, optimally dimensioned for passage through the Swedish canal system, Göta Canal, and for sailing the North Sea and the Baltic Sea.

When, in 1984, Shanti Devi sailed into the Oslofjord, the crew consisted of, in addition to the owners, Captain Sven Kviman, Physician Gun Sandahl, Chief Officer Bengt Persson, Able Seaman Louise Sandahl, carpenter Josef Horvat, Steward's Assistant Poonam Rampal, and Chief Engineer Robert E. Haraldsen (a singer-songwriter nicknamed "Merlin" by Jensen).

In 1985 and 1986, this ship was the main base for planning and administration of the Oslo International Poetry Festival in Oslo, Norway.

The ship's name is a Hindi expression meaning "goddess of Peace". Shanti Devi is also the name of an Indian woman who was at the center of a case of alleged reincarnation.
