= Larkollen =

Village in Rygge, Norway

Coordinates: 59°20′N 10°40′E

Larkollen is a village in Moss municipality, Norway. Its population is 1,382.

== About ==
Larkollen has a coastal landscape with water-washed rocks, coves and small wooded hills, and a cultural landscape just behind the coastal line. The lee side of the islands Sletter, Eldøya, and Kollen south and west of Larkollen was an easily accessible harbor no matter the wind and was also easy to defend. It was the landfall for travel to Christiania from Copenhagen for several centuries. Sometime in the early 19th century the landfall was moved north to Jeløya outside of Moss.

The 500 year-round inhabitants from 1960 grew to almost 1500 in 2010, while the number of summer guests estimated by locals in 1960 to 2500 has fallen substantially in the same period. Growth in the number of people using the popular camping site at Teibern has compensated somewhat for the reduction in cabin/house-based summer guests.

== Etymology ==
Outside Larkollen are islands Kollen and Eldøya (also called Eløen). The name of the coastal village Larkollen is probably connected with the island Kollen's name.

== History ==
Larkollen was the landfall on the main route between Oslo (then called Christiania) and Copenhagen for several centuries.

Larkollen became an important port, and a fortification was built here in 1711 overlooking the harbor and with wide views. The Customs Station from 1749, was in operation (also with a lot of activity during prohibition) up to June 1960 when activity and personnel were moved to Moss. The Customs station has been turned into a summer house for employees in the Customs Authority.

The population started to rapidly grow in the 18th century.

Due to Larkollen having a natural port, pilots, customs, skippers, in-keepers and craftsmen settled down here. On the island Eldøya a settlement was established including an inn, which according to tradition today still stands after being moved to a location north in Larkollen in the 19th century. Several other old houses in Larkollen were moved from Eldøya to the northern part of Larkollen. Today only one of the original buildings remains on Eløen.

In the early 20th century Larkollen, which today is known as a sleepy suburb for Moss, became a prime summer destination for well-to-do families from Oslo and Fredrikstad. The summer houses built by these families still dominate the coastline and the islands at Larkollen. From then until about 1980, two summer hotels operated in Larkollen. In 2010 only one hotel remained, which was torn down. A new hotel is called the Støtvig hotel after the valley that lies near there.

Anthon B. Nilsen, a wealthy sawmill owner from Fredrikstad, is credited with being the first of many summer guests in Larkollen. He built his summer house just north of Larkollen in the 1880s, just after the railroad was opened between Christiania and Fredrikstad, with a station at nearby Dilling. Anthon B. Nilsen was a story-teller and author, who published his work under the pseudonym "Elias Kræmmer". His arrival to Larkollen started the development of the summer destination Larkollen, and many of the large summer houses were built in the period up to 1920. The Nilsen family is still represented in Larkollen, both as permanent residents and summer guests.

== Geology ==
A moraine from the last ice age surfaces on the coast of the island Kollen in the north and follows the shoreline south of Rørvik to the island/peninsula Danmark on the northern side of the Kure fjord. The terrain of Kollen and Danmark and part of the beaches are dominated by large sand and water-scoured moraine rocks that have been moved by the glaciers. On Kollen, Eløen and the Sletter islands to the south, volcanic rock comes up to the surface, as a rhomb porphyric conglomerate, part of the unique Oslo graben. Erosion of this conglomerate due to sea and waves gives rise to the sandy beaches found on these islands. Geologically these islands belong to the western side of the Oslofjord, with a major geological fault between the islands and the east side of the fjord.

== Surrounding area ==
The Støtvig valley contains forests on each side of a good agricultural landscape. There are some oak groves in the surrounding area. Outside Larkollen are islands Kollen and Eldøya (also called Eløen). The coastal village Larkollen, whose name probably is connected with the island Kollen's name, started to grow early in the 18th century.

The 500 year-round inhabitants from 1960 have grown to almost 1500 in 2010, while the number of summer guests estimated by locals in 1960 to 2500 has fallen substantially in the same period. Growth in the number of people using the popular camping site at Teibern has compensated somewhat for the reduction in cabin/house-based summer guests.

Ancient farms in Larkollen are Støtvik and Saltbohuset. Newer, medieval farms are Ammundrød, Tollefsrød, Grefsrød, Buberg and Botner.

== Larkollen in art and literature ==
A 9-year-old's life on the island Kollen in the post-WW2 year 1945-46 has been described in an autobiographic children's book by Astrid Karlsen Scott, "Little House on the Fjord", published by Nordic Adventures Inc. in 2004.

Larkollen in early 19th century has been described in 5 handcolored prints by John W. Edy, an Englishman who traveled widely in Norway and made a large number of prints from those times.

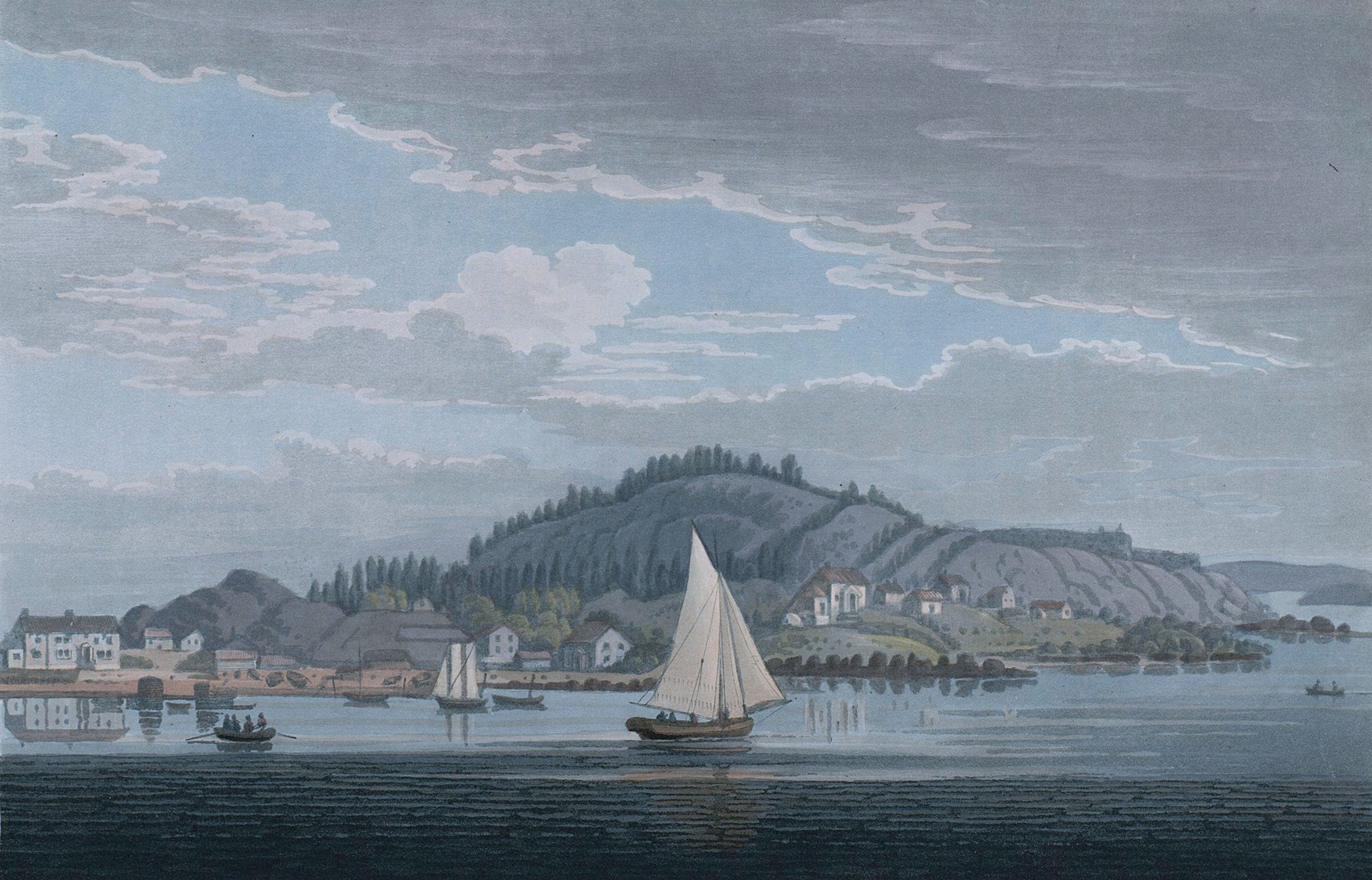
Edy: Larkollen in early 1800s

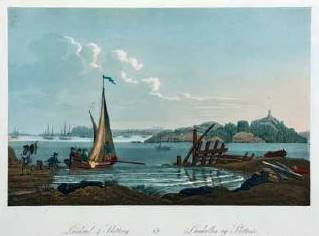
Edy: The island Kollen in the foreground, behind it the islands Eløen and Sletter.

Many of the stories by Elias Kræmmer take place in Larkollen. Larkollen is hometown of Marianne Ihlen, known as the subject of Leonard Cohen's song "So Long, Marianne".

== Notable visitors ==
Norwegian royalty have visited Larkollen several times, on private visits. King Olav often sailed his boat "Sira" from Hankø on day trips to Larkollen and back in later years.

John Forbes Kerry, democratic candidate in the US Presidential Election in 2004, visited Larkollen several times as a teenager in the years from 1959–62, when his family lived in Oslo. They often came sailing, at first in a small BB11 "Bobolink", later in a new build Colin Archer design "Christiania".

== Notable residents ==
- Arvid Anseth (1925–2006), ophthalmologist
