= Hariton Pushwagner =

Norwegian artist (1940–2018)

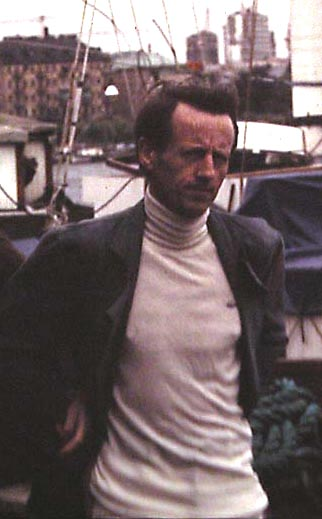
- Pushwagner in front of Axel Jensen's ship "S/Y Shanti Devi", 1983
- Born: Terje Brofos; 2 May 1940; Oslo, Norway
- Died: 24 April 2018 (aged 77); Oslo, Norway
- Known for: Pop art

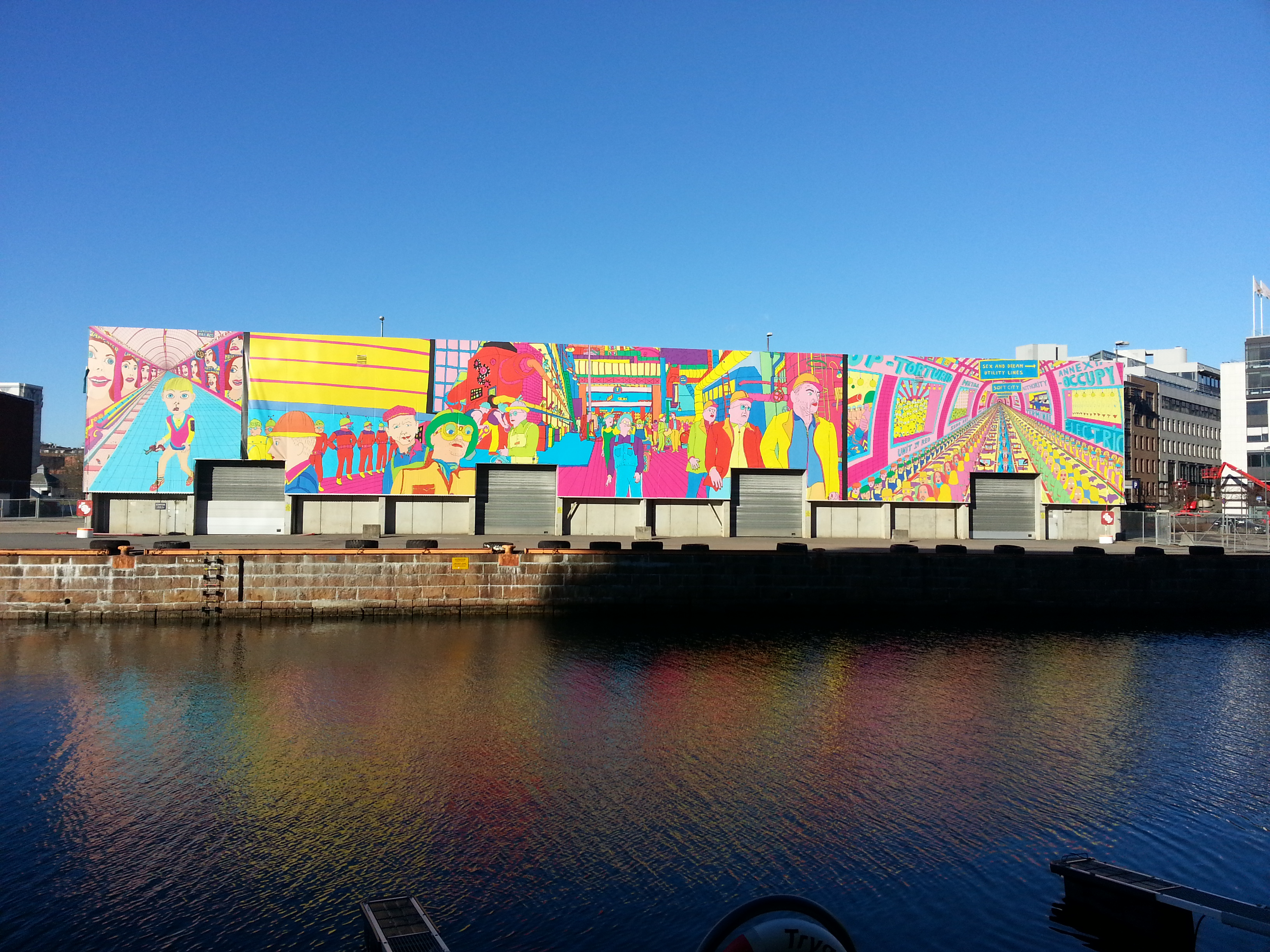
Storage building at Tjuvholmen in Oslo, Norway decorated with some of the later works of Pushwagner. From the left: “Subway Kid”, “The factory” and “Kings Cross”.

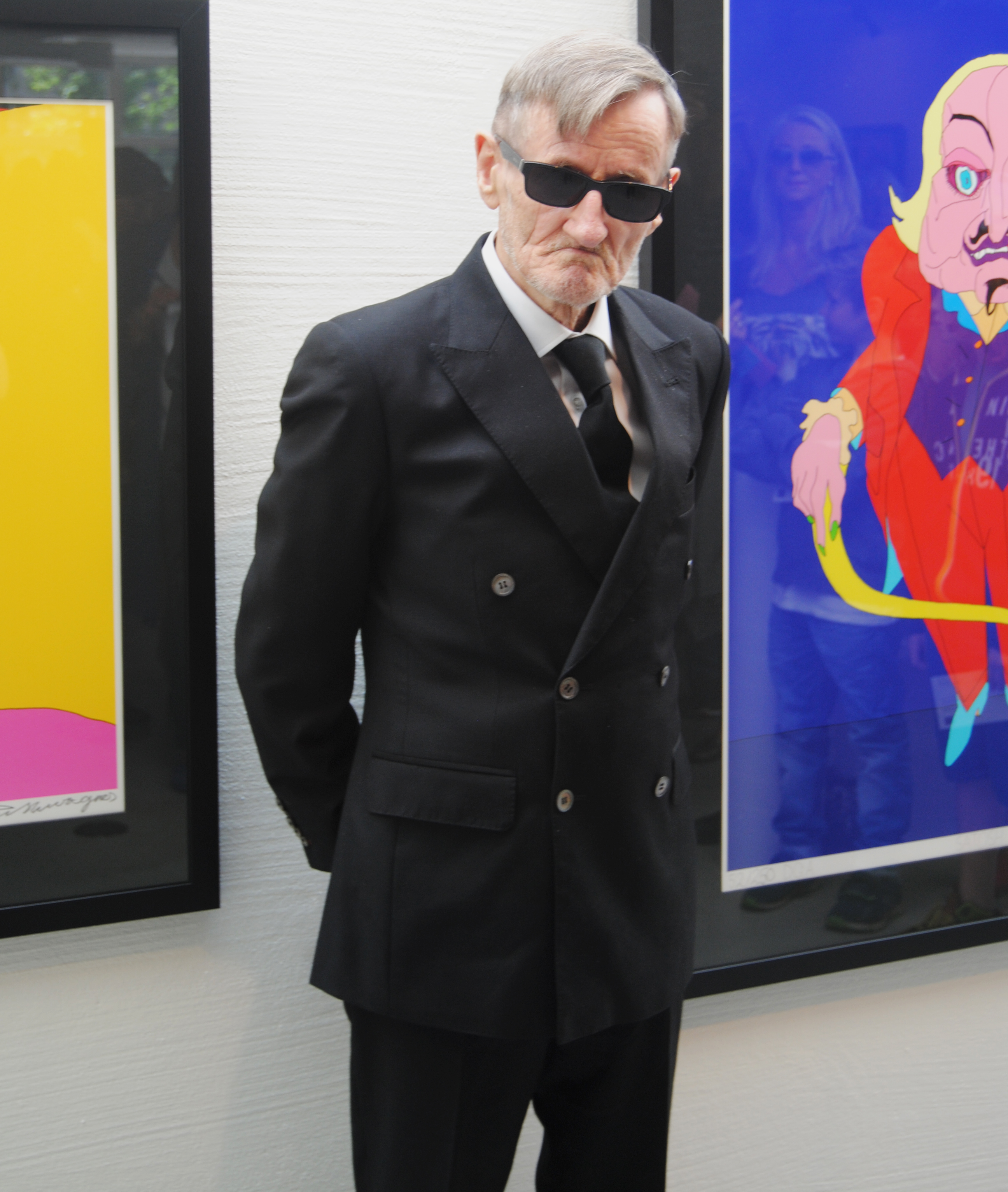
Pushwagner at his opening at Bærum Kunstforening on 7 June 2014 in Sandvika, Norway.

Terje Brofos (2 May 1940 – 24 April 2018), better known by stage name Hariton Pushwagner, was a Norwegian Pop artist.

== Early life and education ==
Born as Terje Brofos during a bomb attack in May 1940, he grew in Berg, a neighborhood in the North End of Oslo. In 1944, he was severely injured in a traffic accident. His father Fritjof was an engineer who struggled with alcohol. His mother Elsa worked as a biochemist and would eventually leave her husband.

During his youth, he excelled in both summer and winter sports. He became one of Norway's best tennis players and in 1955 played in a doubles final for the Norwegian championship with Arne Melander, a match which the duo lost.

Pushwagner finished his education at the State's School of Art and Design of Oslo in 1959. He stated that he quit drawing for a period after his studies and that he struggled for several years to find his personal style.

== Career ==
Pushwagner described himself as a spiritual student of Norwegian author Axel Jensen, whom he met at Kunstnernes Hus in 1968. Pushwagner and Jensen lived together for a time, partly in an apartment in Oslo, Norway and partly in Fredrikstad, Norway; Stockholm, Sweden and Menorca, Spain. Pushwagner illustrated Jensen's book Og resten står skrivd i stjernene/And the Rest is Writ(ten) in the Stars (1995). Fascinated by comics since childhood, Pushwagner was inspired to start the series "Soft City" and "Doktor Fantastisk" during this period.

Pushwagner won back the rights to his drawings from Morten Dreyer in 2009.

In July 2012, London-based publisher Art / Books published an extensive monograph on his work to coincide with an exhibition at MK Gallery in Milton Keynes, United Kingdom that subsequently toured to Haugar Vestfold Kunstmuseum in Norway and Museum Boijmans van Beuningen in the Netherlands.

== Personal life and death ==
Pushwagner was twice divorced and had two daughters.

He was diagnosed with lung cancer and died at Diakonhjemmet Hospital on 24 April 2018. He was 77.

He is buried at Our Saviour’s cemetery in Oslo.

== Education and further studies ==
- 1958-61, Norwegian National Academy of Craft and Art Industry, Oslo, Norway
- 1963-66, Norwegian National Academy of Fine Arts, Oslo, Norway
- 1970-80, Studies, London, UK and Stockholm, Sweden
- 1988-89, Studies, New York City, United States
- 1991-92, Cité internationale des arts in Paris

== Bibliography ==
- Pushwagner, Hariton (2016). Soft City. New York Review of Books. ISBN 978-1681370460.
