= Marianne & Leonard: Words of Love =

2019 documentary film

- Poster
- Directed by: Nick Broomfield
- Produced by: Nick Broomfield; Kyle Gibbon; Shani Hinton; Marc Hoeferlin
- Starring: Leonard Cohen; Judy Collins; Ron Cornelius; Helle Goldman; Marianne Ihlen; John Lissauer; Don Lowe; John Simon; Richard Vick; Aviva Layton; Jan Christian Mollestad
- Narrated by: Nick Broomfield
- Cinematography: Barney Broomfield
- Edited by: Marc Hoeferlin
- Music by: Nick Laird-Clowes
- Production companies: Kew Media Group; BBC
- Distributed by: Roadside Attractions; Dogwoof
- Release dates: 27 January 2019 (Sundance); 5 July 2019
- Running time: 102 minutes
- Countries: United Kingdom; United States; Canada; Greece
- Languages: English; Norwegian
- Box office: $1,401,207

Marianne & Leonard: Words of Love is a 2019 documentary film directed by Nick Broomfield, about the relationship between writer and singer Leonard Cohen and his "muse" Marianne Ihlen, in particular their time spent on the Greek island of Hydra in the 1960s and 1970s. She was the inspiration behind "So Long, Marianne", "Hey, That's No Way to Say Goodbye" and "Bird on the Wire".

== Release ==
The film premiered at the 2019 Sundance Film Festival.

=== Critical reception ===
Critical reaction is generally positive. On Rotten Tomatoes the film has an approval rating of 79% based on reviews from 116 critics. The site's critical consensus reads, "It suffers from a somewhat one-sided approach, but Marianne & Leonard: Words of Love is an absorbing glimpse of a fascinating chapter of its subjects' lives." On Metacritic the film has a weighted average score of 69 based on reviews from 19 critics, indicating "generally favorable reviews".

The Guardian gave it 4 stars out of 5, calling it a "tender, vivid snapshot of a singer and his 'muse'." The Irish Independent gave it 4 stars as well, saying "Broomfield's film has an unhurried, digressive style that seems oddly appropriate to its dreamy, quasi-mythical story. But he sentimentalises neither Leonard nor Susanne [sic], and makes it clear that there was a downside to Hydra's carefree hedonism." RogerEbert.com awarded it 2½ stars out of 4, and said "The strongest aspect of "Marianne and Leonard" has nothing to do with Ihlen or Cohen, but is the vivid picture painted of the 1960s counterculture, particularly its manifestation on Hydra."

The New Statesman said that the film "romanticises a sexist trope" and that Broomfield "falls into the same trap as Cohen, rendering Ihlen into nothing more than the play-thing of a male artist." Empire Online awarded it 2 out of 5, saying "Words Of Love claims to honour a love story between a man and a woman, one that transcends creative differences and the weariness of time. But through scattershot interviews with friends and collaborators, it feels more like a half-hearted biopic about Cohen throughout his tumultuous career – with a bit of intimate gossip intercut here and there."

== See also ==
- A Theatre for Dreamers, a 2020 literary fiction novel by Polly Samson
- So Long, Marianne (TV series), a 2024 Norwegian-Canadian eight part biographical drama television miniseries about the 1960s romance
