= Martin Johnston =

Australian poet and novelist (1947-1990)

Martin Johnston (12 November 1947 – 21 June 1990) was an Australian poet and novelist.

== Biography ==
Martin Johnston was born in Sydney on 12 November 1947, son of the writers George Johnston and Charmian Clift. His early childhood was spent in London and Sydney. In 1954 the family moved to Greece. They returned to England in 1960 and Australia in 1964.

He was educated at North Sydney Boys High School and Sydney University.

In the mid-to-late 1970s he lived and travelled with Australian writer, Nadia Wheatley. They lived and wrote in Greece from 1975 to 1977, and travelled through Europe before returning to Australia in 1978.

In October 1982 he married Roseanne Bonney, and they lived in Darlinghurst, Sydney.

He died on 21 June 1990 at age 42.

== Works ==
- shadowmass. (Sydney University Arts Society, 1971) [poems]
- Ithaka: Modern Greek Poetry in Translation. (Island Press, 1973) [poems]
- The Sea-Cucumber. (University of Queensland Press, 1978) [poems]
- Cicada Gambit. (Hale & Iremonger, 1983) [novel]
- The Typewriter Considered as a Bee-Trap. (Hale & Iremonger, 1985) [poems]
- Martin Johnston: Selected Poems and Prose. (UQP, 1993)
- Beautiful Objects: Selected Poems. (Ligature, 2020)
