= The Christmas Oratorio =

Book by Göran Tunström

- First edition
- Author: Göran Tunström
- Original title: Juloratoriet
- Translator: Paul Hoover
- Cover artist: Jan Biberg
- Language: Swedish
- Set in: Värmland, Sweden; New Zealand
- Published: 1983
- Publisher: Bonniers
- Publication place: Sweden
- Pages: 329
- ISBN: 91-0-045394-3

The Christmas Oratorio (Swedish: Juloratoriet) is a 1983 novel by Swedish author Göran Tunström. It won the Nordic Council Literature Prize in 1984. J. S. Bach's Christmas Oratorio plays an important part in the novel.

It was adapted into a film version in 1996.
