= Sunne, Sweden =

Sunne
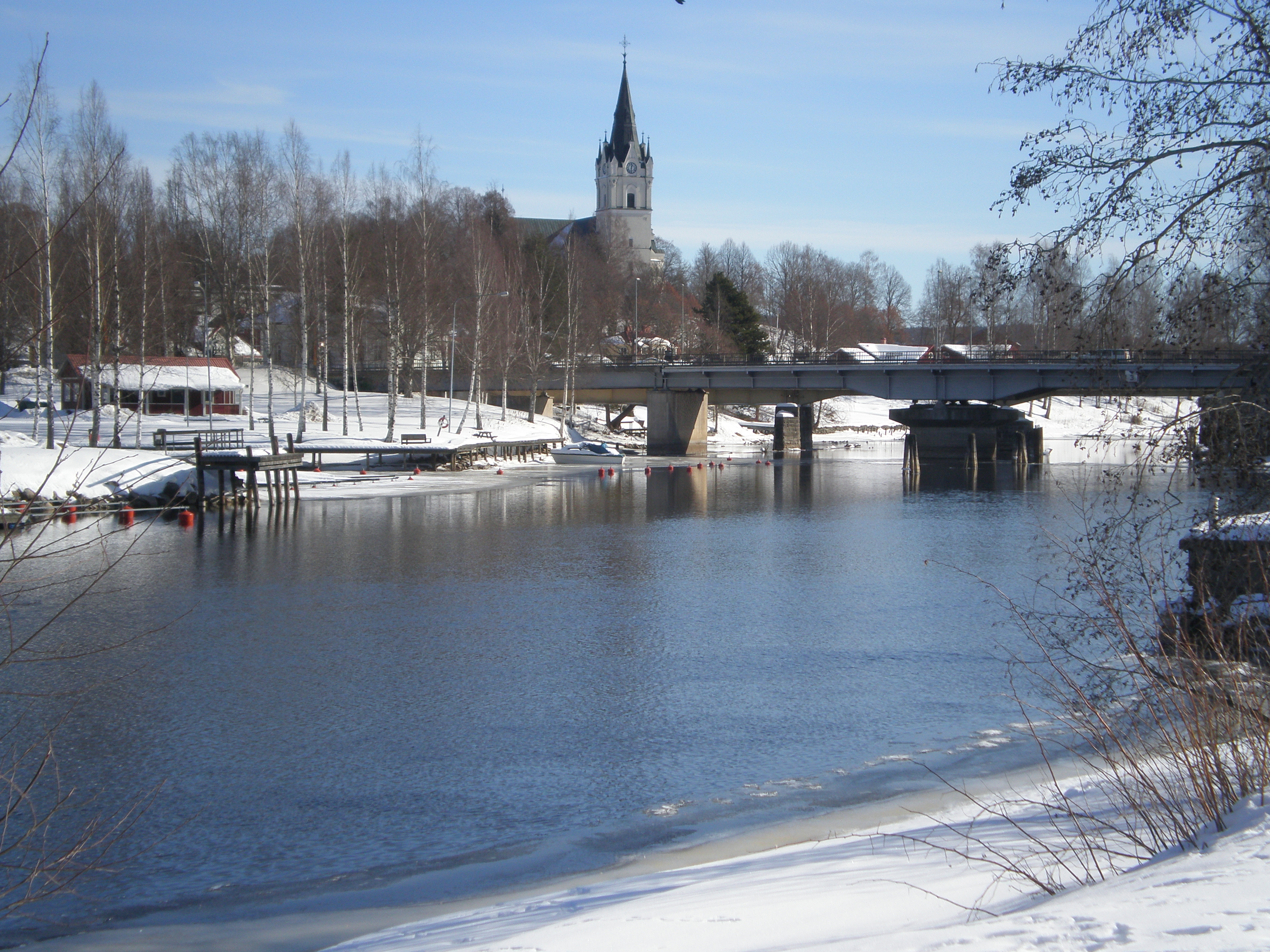
- Sunne Sound and Sunne Church in March 2010

- Location within Sweden
- Coordinates: 59°50′N 13°08′E
- Country: Sweden
- Province: Värmland
- County: Värmland County
- Municipality: Sunne Municipality

Area
  - Total: 4.57 km^{2} (1.76 sq mi)

Population (2019)
  - Total: 13,000
  - Density: 1,078/km^{2} (2,790/sq mi)
- Time zone: UTC+1 (CET)
  - Summer (DST): UTC+2 (CEST)

Sunne is a locality and the seat of Sunne Municipality, Värmland County, Sweden with 10,000 inhabitants in 2010.

The town straddles the sound connecting Övre Fryken (Northern lake) with Mellan-Fryken (Middle lake). The name of Sunne is derived from the Swedish word of 'sund' for a maritime sound.

Printing and packaging are significant industries in Sunne. The companies Tetra Pak and Miller Graphics have facilities in the town and the local college provides a specialist course in printing technology.

In the summer there is a large music festival.

The painter Tage Åsén who made the cover paintings for two of his books about Sunne and who currently is working on his project about Sunne called Brobytornet (the Broby Tower). Broby is the name Selma Lagerlöf gave Sunne in her books. Each year The Foundation Selma Lagerlöf Literary Prize awards a prominent Swedish writer.

== Climate ==
Sunne has a humid continental climate. Due to moderating influences from the North Atlantic and the lake Vänern to its south, it is a lot milder than areas in northern Värmland or western Dalarna such as Höljes or Malung. Even so, it is prone to chilly nights year round due to its position in a river valley with high hills both to its west and east. There is a relatively high precipitation amount by central Sweden standards. This contributes to summer afternoon temperatures lower than would be expected for a low-lying inland location on the particular latitude in Sweden.

Climate data for Sunne (2002–2021 averages, extremes since 1995)
| Month | Jan | Feb | Mar | Apr | May | Jun | Jul | Aug | Sep | Oct | Nov | Dec | Year |
|---|---|---|---|---|---|---|---|---|---|---|---|---|---|
| Record high °C (°F) | 9.4 (48.9) | 10.6 (51.1) | 19.1 (66.4) | 24.5 (76.1) | 29.1 (84.4) | 30.8 (87.4) | 32.4 (90.3) | 29.8 (85.6) | 24.0 (75.2) | 18.8 (65.8) | 15.5 (59.9) | 11.3 (52.3) | 32.4 (90.3) |
| Mean maximum °C (°F) | 6.1 (43.0) | 6.9 (44.4) | 13.2 (55.8) | 18.5 (65.3) | 24.1 (75.4) | 26.5 (79.7) | 28.3 (82.9) | 26.5 (79.7) | 22.0 (71.6) | 15.7 (60.3) | 10.7 (51.3) | 7.2 (45.0) | 29.4 (84.9) |
| Mean daily maximum °C (°F) | −0.8 (30.6) | 0.2 (32.4) | 5.0 (41.0) | 11.1 (52.0) | 16.1 (61.0) | 20.4 (68.7) | 22.5 (72.5) | 20.8 (69.4) | 16.4 (61.5) | 9.5 (49.1) | 4.4 (39.9) | 0.7 (33.3) | 10.5 (50.9) |
| Daily mean °C (°F) | −3.9 (25.0) | −3.3 (26.1) | 0.3 (32.5) | 5.7 (42.3) | 10.1 (50.2) | 14.4 (57.9) | 16.6 (61.9) | 15.7 (60.3) | 11.3 (52.3) | 5.8 (42.4) | 1.7 (35.1) | −2.3 (27.9) | 6.0 (42.8) |
| Mean daily minimum °C (°F) | −6.9 (19.6) | −6.8 (19.8) | −4.5 (23.9) | −0.8 (30.6) | 4.0 (39.2) | 8.3 (46.9) | 10.6 (51.1) | 9.6 (49.3) | 6.2 (43.2) | 2.0 (35.6) | −1.0 (30.2) | −5.3 (22.5) | 1.3 (34.3) |
| Mean minimum °C (°F) | −19.2 (−2.6) | −18.0 (−0.4) | −13.9 (7.0) | −6.3 (20.7) | −2.8 (27.0) | 2.4 (36.3) | 4.8 (40.6) | 3.0 (37.4) | −1.7 (28.9) | −5.8 (21.6) | −9.7 (14.5) | −16.2 (2.8) | −22.6 (−8.7) |
| Record low °C (°F) | −28.3 (−18.9) | −28.3 (−18.9) | −24.6 (−12.3) | −12.2 (10.0) | −5.6 (21.9) | −0.3 (31.5) | 1.4 (34.5) | −0.9 (30.4) | −4.9 (23.2) | −12.0 (10.4) | −16.2 (2.8) | −28.0 (−18.4) | −28.3 (−18.9) |
| Average precipitation mm (inches) | 53.8 (2.12) | 38.5 (1.52) | 36.5 (1.44) | 35.2 (1.39) | 66.9 (2.63) | 63.9 (2.52) | 82.4 (3.24) | 97.4 (3.83) | 61.0 (2.40) | 73.4 (2.89) | 62.3 (2.45) | 56.2 (2.21) | 727.5 (28.64) |
Source 1: SMHI Open Data for Sunne A, precipitation
Source 2: SMHI Open Data for Sunne A, temperature

== Notable people ==
- Sven-Göran Eriksson (1948–2024), football coach, former coach of the England national football team, was born and died in Sunne and had a house on the outskirts of the town.
- Ursula and Sabina Eriksson (born 1967), twin sisters, convicted of manslaughter in England, grew up in Sunne.
- Ana Johnsson (born 1977), singer, grew up in Sunne.
- Selma Lagerlöf (1858–1940), writer, winner of Nobel Prize in Literature, was born and lived in Mårbacka, just southeast of Sunne. Two of the town's hotels are named after her.
- Göran Tunström (1937–2000), author, grew up in Sunne.
