= Axel Jensen =

Norwegian author (1932–2003)

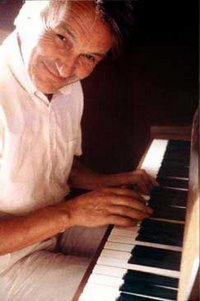
- Axel Jensen by the piano. Photo: Robert E. Haraldsen
- Born: Axel Buchardt Jensen; 12 February 1932; Trondheim, Norway
- Died: 13 February 2003 (aged 71); Ålefjær, Kristiansand, Norway
- Occupation: Author
- Spouse(s): Marianne Ihlen (1958–1962); Pratibha (1974–2003)
- Partner: Lena Folke-Olsson
- Children: Axel Joachim (1960–2026)
- Parent(s): Dagny Teodora and Finn Reidar Jensen
- Awards: Ossietzky Award (1994); Fritt Ord Honorary Award (1996)

Axel Buchardt Jensen (12 February 1932 – 13 February 2003) was a Norwegian author. From 1957 until 2002, he published both fiction and non-fiction texts which include novels, poems, essays, a biography, and manuscripts for cartoons and animated films.

== Biography ==
Jensen was born on 12 February 1932 in Trondheim to Dagny Teodora (née Buchardt, 1908–2000) and Finn Reidar Jensen (1901–1967). His father owned a sausage factory, Axel Jensens fabrikker, in Oslo. His parents later divorced. His father's second marriage produced two sons.

Jensen completed three years of high school but only lasted a couple of days at university as he didn't like the quiet polite lectures and so gave it up. He then undertook a number of labouring jobs, while writing in his spare time. He managed to get some stories published in the Aftenposten newspaper, but most of the short stories he submitted to journals and magazines were rejected. In the early 1950s he went travelling in Northern Africa, during which time he met John Starr Cooke in the Sahara and went on to become friends with him.

== Meets Marianne Ihlen ==
In 1954 Jensen flagged down a car on Majorstua Street in Oslo containing 19 year old Marianne Ihlen and invited her to a party. Jensen subsequently telephoned her and they met up in Dovrehallen, a student pub at which they committed to a relationship. Jensen took whatever work he could find to support himself as he wrote short stories for newspapers and magazines.

In 1955 Jensen self-published his first book, the surrealist Dyretemmerens kors, but he later burned the remaining unsold books. Niels Christian Brøgger's review in the 12 December 1955 edition of the Nationen newspaper commented:

Axel Jensen does not write for a popular audience, and his mystical language will probably not be understood or appreciated by many. But considered as an experiment the book is interesting, and it is a pleasure to meet a young author who is not following the herd.

In that same year he and Ihlen travelled to Copenhagen to meet John Starr Cooke who was ill in a hospital with suspected malaria.

Ihlen frequently clashed with her father over Jensen, as he thought that Jensen who came from a broken home lacked a good education, a job and a place of his own to live, unlike the children of his middle class friends and acquaintances. Jensen was aggressive when he became drunk and at one party pushed his way into the room where Ihlen was sleeping and made her watch as he took a knife, spread his hand out on a kitchen table and stabbed it three times.

In 1957 Jensen was called up to undertake his compulsory military service but upon reporting for duty was able to talk his way out of completing it.

== Publication of Ikaros – ung mann i Sahara ==
In 1957 Jensen's novel Ikaros – ung mann i Sahara (Icarus – A Young Man in Sahara) was published by Henrik Groth of Cappelen (with an initial print run of 6,000). It described a quest for experience of a young man as he journeyed across the Sahara. It was reviewed by over 30 Norwegian newspapers and highly praised by a number of literary critics with Kjølv Egeland of the Vinduet magazine commenting that "Here is one of the year's most sensational works of fiction. Sumptuously rich, brightly talented, fascinating."

Ihlen thought they had a committed relationship with long-held plans to travel to Greece but later that same year one evening out of the blue Jensen introduced her to another young woman at the Theatre Café in Oslo and informed Ihlen that there would be no trip to Greece as he was leaving tomorrow with the other woman for Egypt. Ihlen stormed out and made her way in a stage of shock back to where she is staying only to be woken at 4 o'clock by Jensen at the doorstep saying, "We're going to Greece! It's you I want to travel with!"

== Hydra ==
In mid-November the reunited couple over her parents' objections departed by train for Greece with plans to be away for a year, with Jensen intending to spend the time writing. Disembarking from the train in Hamburg they purchased a second-hand Volkswagen Beetle. Driving south they visited Venice and Rome before passing through Yugoslavia into Greece. On the way south from Thessaloniki Ihlen was forced to have an emergency operation for appendicitis in the village of Lamia. Ihlen remained in hospital for a week recovering and it wasn't until December that they reached Athens where they stayed with their friends Per and Else Berit who had moved there the year before. Jensen had originally intended that they rent an apartment in Athens, but their friends suggested they could live more cheaply on the island of Hydra, which was three hours away by ferry. After visiting Delphi the couple drove down to Erminoni in the Peloponnese where their landlady at the place they stayed allowed them to park their car in her garden. It was from here that they took a ferry to Hydra.

After initially renting Jensen used part of an advance of 40,000 kroner (approximately US$6,000) that he had received from Groth as an advance for his next book to purchase a house on Kala Pigadia Street for approximately US$2,500 on Hydra. After making repairs to the house the couple were left with just over US$2,000 on which to live on until Jensen's next book was published, with the house offered as security for one year's line of credit at a local grocery store. The house was simple, with an outside toilet and electricity for only one hour in the evening and one hour in the morning. Otherwise, they used paraffin lamps. The couple soon became a component part of the foreign community on the island and friends with Charmian Clift and her husband George Johnston. Some months later the Swedish writer Göran Tunström arrived on the island and rented a house close by, becoming a friend. Ihlen remained on Hydra when it was necessary for Jensen to travel back several times to Norway to capitalize on the success of Ikaros – ung mann i Sahara.

On one of these trips Jensen met a woman named Sonja and became besotted with her after five days of acquaintance. Upon his return to Hydra in late 1958 he informed Ihlen that the woman was coming to the island and that his relationship with her was over. In response Ihlen packed a bag and left to stay in Athens for a few days with the idea of getting a job there. She subsequently found work as a cook on a chartered schooner, by the end of which Ihlen returned to stay with Per and Else Berit in Athens, who observed that the experience had transformed her into a serene and more confident person. Meanwhile, Jensen had been on a six-week-long drinking binge, as he had purchased a ticket for Sonja to travel to join him in Greece, only to find that she had sold the ticket and kept the money.

== Marriage ==
While Jensen was in Athens he chanced upon Ihlen, falling in love with her again. He immediately asked her to marry him and she accepted. They married on 22 October 1958 in the Anglican Church in Athens, against her parents' wishes.

They then returned to their house on Hydra. While Jensen had by now delivered the first draft of his new novel which had the working title Linedansen to Cappelen, in order to bring in extra money both Ihlen and Jensen worked over the spring of 1959 on the schooner that Ihlen had previously worked on.

== Success of Line ==
Groth considered that Linedansen, which translates as "The Line Dance", a pun on the name of the main character's love interest, was distasteful for a book of which he had a high opinion and convinced Jensen to change it to Line. With the novel printed and approaching its publishing date in 1959 Jensen and a by now pregnant Ihlen travelled to Oslo, where both were able to catch up with family and friends.

The novel's central protagonist is Jacob, a restless troubled young man who falls unhappily in love with Line. The novel used what was considered to be vulgar language at the time and contained erotic scenes of sexual intercourse which infuriated some critics who considered it to be immoral. One with such an opinion was the influential Aftenposten newspaper which refused to review the book and one public library refused to stock it. While the critic for the Morgenbladet newspaper considered it utterly devoid of artistic value, the critic for the Arbeiderbladet newspaper wrote:

A profound, bleeding earnest and an extravagant desperation and joie de vivre shines through Axel Jensen's new novel.

The novel was such a success in Norway that it was translated into English and published in 1962 with the title A Girl I Knew.

The success of the novel allowed Jensen to travel in October with Ihlen, Per and Else Berit to Stockholm where via friends they purchased a Karmann Ghia. Due to Jensen being unable to drive due to a drunk driving conviction Ihlen drove the car back to Oslo. The couple's son Axel Joachim was born on 21 January 1960 in Oslo. Following the birth Jensen travelled back to Hydra in order to avoid paying Norwegian taxes, Ihlen stayed in Oslo for four months before she and Axel Joachim followed him back to Hydra.

== Relationship with Patricia Amlin ==
Following her return to Hydra, Ihlen became aware that Jensen had acquired a new lover, the American painter Patricia Amlin.

With their relationship deteriorating, Jensen decided to leave on his sailboat, a BBII that he had had transported by ship to Piraeus. Amlin left separately in order to spare Ihlen the public humiliation before meeting up with Jensen in Poros. They then took up residence in Athens. Soon after, Amlin was badly injured when she crashed Jensen's Karmann Ghia near Athens and was flung out of the car, breaking many bones and developing gangrene, which required amputation of a thumb. Jensen struggled with the situation and, three days later, telegrammed Ihlen asking for her help. By now, Ihlen was involved with the Canadian writer and poet Leonard Cohen, who urged Ihlen to leave her son with him while she travelled to Athens, where she maintained a vigil by Amlin's bed, allowing Jensen to rest. After three days, she returned to Hydra.

Jensen allowed Ihlen to live in the house on Hydra and following their formal divorce a year later, transferred ownership to her and their son. After taking Amlin back to America, Jensen travelled around Mexico with his friend John Starr Cooke, experimenting with psychedelic drugs and catching malaria before returning to Hydra in the summer of 1960. Here, he rented a house in which to write. Jensen remained friendly with both Ihlen and Cohen. Axel Joachim lived with his mother and, for most of his childhood, had little contact with his father, Cohen becoming his surrogate father, even to the extent of paying for his boarding schools in England and Switzerland as well as his flights. At the age of 15, Axel Joachim was taken on a trip to India by Jensen and given LSD by his father. As he grew older, he developed psychiatric problems and, from 1979 onwards, spent a large part of his adult life being institutionalized in Norway. The 2020 documentary Little Axel explored his life.

In 1961 Line was made into a film directed by Nils Reinhardt Christensen. It was released under the name Line in Norway and as The Passionate Demons in overseas markets. It starred Margarete Robsahm as Line and Toralv Maurstad in the role of Jacob. It caused a minor scandal in Norway at the time, as Robsahm was the first actress ever to expose her breasts in a Norwegian movie. In 1961 Jensen's novel Joacim was published. The novel is about a young man searching for meaning in his life who travels to Greece, where he meets Cecilie, a Danish student with whom he has a relationship. There is widespread belief that the character Lorenzo in the novel is modelled after Cohen, but Jensen also told Cohen that Lorenzo was modelled after the Swedish novelist Göran Tunström who for a period resided on Hydra.

Following a drunken altercation with a policeman, Jensen was expelled from Hydra in 1962, and he never saw Ihlen again, though they continued to correspond.

== Return to Norway ==
Jensen eventually returned to Norway and by 1966 had settled in Fredrikstad. There, Noel Cobb, an English poet and student of psychology, came to interview him. Cobb became sexually involved with Jensen's girlfriend Lena Folke-Olsson, by whom he had a child. Jensen later left Fredrikstad to live in London.

Jensen suffered from severe depression after the break-up with Folke-Olsson, but in London he met the psychiatrist R. D. Laing and received therapy from him. After recovering, Jensen worked as an assistant at the institution Kingsley Hall. Laing remained a close friend for the rest of his life.

While attending an environmental conference in Stockholm in 1972, Jensen met Pratibha (1935–2018), whom he married in India in 1973. She had a son and a daughter from a previous marriage. After returning to Sweden, the couple lived in Vaxholm outside Stockholm, where they bought an old schooner, built in 1905, which they renamed S/Y Shanti Devi. The ship was named after Pratibha's mother and means "The Goddess of Peace". After restoring the ship with the help of good friends and its former crew, they finally set course for England in 1984. Unfortunately, due to a storm at sea, they were forced to seek harbour in Oslo after a short, hazardous journey.

When Jensen arrived in Oslo, he met his old friend, the writer Olav Angell. Together, they wanted to transform Oslo into a city renowned for happenings on the scene of international literature. The plan was soon put into action, and Jensen became the front figure in a project which later developed into the Oslo International Poetry Festival (OIPF), occurring in 1985 and 1986.

On 10 August 1990, Shanti Devi set course for what would be its final destination in Ålefjær, outside Kristiansand. There, Jensen and Pratibha settled in a hundred-year-old schoolhouse and, some years later, they sold their old ship.

In the last ten years of his life, Jensen was severely disabled from Amyotrophic lateral sclerosis (ALS). He gradually became paralyzed, losing all his motor-coordination abilities. Later, relying on a breathing aid to breathe, he could neither write nor speak. During this period, he also led a difficult campaign against what he termed "the health machinery" for the right to be nursed in his own home. Jensen wrote several essays and articles on this subject. Before the public health service provided the help he needed, private funding to pay for nursing was arranged by his close friends, including Leonard Cohen. His wife also nursed him until he died at his home in Ålefjær on 13 February 2003, a day after his 71st birthday.

In 1996, he received the Fritt Ord Honorary Award.

== Writing style ==
Apart from his first symbolistic novel, Dyretemmerens Kors, Jensen's early novels mostly depict young men that attempt to break away from their social and cultural backgrounds. These novels include Icarus: A Young Man in Sahara (1957) (a new 1999 edition is illustrated by Frans Widerberg), A Girl I Knew (1959), and Joacim (1961). Some critics have argued that these early novels are influenced by Beat authors like Jack Kerouac, Allen Ginsberg, and William Burroughs. The reason for this is that the novel's male main characters often try to escape from their obligations in a Western capitalistic society. Instead, they try to replace their former life with some sort of undefined spiritualism and fail miserably in their attempt.

Later, Jensen departed from the realism in his early novels and began to move in a new direction by writing science fiction, poems, essays, and manuscripts for cartoons. In this experimental phase, he produced manuscripts for the psychedelic comic-strip Doctor Fantastic (published in the newspaper Dagbladet between March and July 1972), the science fiction comic strip collage Tago (1979), the animated movie Superfreak (1988), and a manuscript for a comic novel which is a caricature-rendering of the life of the French playwright and founder of pataphysics, Alfred Jarry. In the same period, Jensen also published a poem-collection with a hindu theme called Onalila – A Little East West poetry (1974), an essayistic novel called Mother India (1974), and three autobiographical novels named Junior (1978), Senior (1979), and Jumbo (1998).

Jensen is perhaps most famous for having written the science fiction novels Epp (1965), Lul (1992), and And the Rest is Written in the Stars (1995), illustrated by Pushwagner. With these novels, Jensen created a dystopian vision of the future, much in the tradition of Aldous Huxley, George Orwell, and Ray Bradbury. Nevertheless, Jensen's novels also differ from these authors since the tragic vision in his novels is supplemented with comedy, setting an ambiguous and absurd tone. In this way, Jensen's novels are similar to the satirical and parodic novels of Jonathan Swift and Kurt Vonnegut.

Besides his fiction, Jensen also published a series of articles and essays which focused on three main political and social issues. His collection of essays, God Does Not Read Novels. A Voyage in the World of Salman Rushdie (1994), is a critique of the fatwa against Salman Rushdie and a defense of freedom of speech. Another political text is the article A Children's Disease, published in the anthology The Collective Fairytale. A Book about Norway, Europe and the EU (1994). This article discusses Norway's role as a future member in the European Union. The third main issue that was of great concern to him was how sick and disabled people are treated in a modern bureaucratic society. Two books containing articles on this subject was therefore published – The Deafening Silence (1997) and The Patient in the Centre (1998). All the articles are an account of how it is to suffer from ALS and at the same time not receive adequate help from the Norwegian welfare state.

Among his political writings, Jensen also found the time to write a biography on G. I. Gurdjieff, titled Guru – Glimpses from the World of Gurdijieff (2002). In addition to this, Jensen co-wrote his autobiography, Life Seen From Nimbus (2002), with Peter Mæjlender.

Jensen received a literary prize from the Austrian Abraham Woursell Foundation in 1965 for his novel Epp. In 1992, Jensen was given the annual literary award from the Norwegian publishing house Cappelen for his novel Lul. For his essays on Salman Rushdie, he received the Carl von Ossietzky award from the International PEN club in 1994 and an award from The Freedom of Expression Foundation in Norway.

== Bibliography ==
Novels

- 1955: Dyretemmerens kors (translated title: The Cross of the Animal Tamer).
- 1957: Ikaros – ung mann i Sahara (translated title: Icarus – A Young Man in Sahara). A new edition illustrated by Frans Widerberg was published in 1999 by JM Stenersens Publishing.
- 1959: Line (translated title: A Girl I Knew), adapted into the 1961 film The Passionate Demons
- 1961: Joacim
- 1965: Epp (new edition in 2002)
- 1974: Mor India /Mother India
- 1978: Junior
- 1979: Senior
- 1992: Lul
- 1995: Og resten står skrivd i stjernene/And the Rest is Writ(ten) in the Stars, illustrated by the artist Hariton Pushwagner
- 1998: Jumbo

Other works

- 1974: "Onalila – en liten østvestpoesi"/" Onalila – A Little East West Poetry "
- 1978: Blodsband, autobiografi, published in Sweden (translated by Jan Verner-Carlsson)
- 1979: Tago, science fiction-collage, drawings by Per Ekholm
- 1993: Trollmannen i Ålefjær (Axel Jensen on Axel Jensen) by Jan Christian Mollestad
- 1994: Det kollektive eventyr, «en bok om Norge, Europa og EU»/The Collective Fairytale.A Book about Norway, Europe and the EU, an anthology where Axel Jensen contributed with his article " A Children's Disease ".
- 1994: Gud leser ikke romaner.En vandring i Salman Rushdies verden/God Does Not Read Novels. A Journey in The World of Salman Rushdie, essay
- 1995: Doktor Fantastisk/Doctor Fantastic, comic strip, drawn by Tore Bernitz Pedersen
- 1997: Den øredøvende stillheten/The Deafening Silence, articles
- 1998: Pasienten i sentrum/The Patient in the Centre (Rapport fra Nimbus) og Pasienten i periferien, articles
- 1998: En mann for sin hatt: Alfred Jarry (1873–1907), illustrated by Per og Gisela Ekholm (Geelmuyden.Kiese Publishing)
- 2002: Livet sett fra Nimbus/Life Seen From Nimbus, autobiography in cooperation with Petter Mejlænder (Spartacus Publishing)
- 2002: Guru – glimt fra Gurdjieffs verden/Guru – Glimpses From the World of Gurdijeff, in cooperation with Eric Delanouë
- 2019: Axel; fra smokken til Ovnen; storyen om Axel Jensen, biography by Torgrim Eggen, publisher Cappelen Damm.

Awards
Preceded by Paal-Helge Haugen	Recipient of the Cappelen Prize; 1992	Succeeded by Erik Bye, Tor Bomann-Larsen
