= Noel Cobb =

American poet

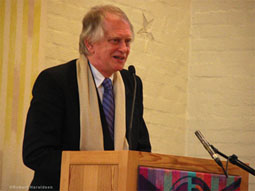
Noel Cobb, 2003. Credit: Robert Haraldsen

Noel Cobb (21 March 1938 in Grand Rapids, Michigan, USA – 2 January 2015, England) was a philosopher, psychologist and author.

Cobb lived and studied in Norway from 1959 to 1966 and made many friends there, among them Axel Jensen, Jan Erik Vold and August Lange.

He published numerous books of poetry and non-fiction. He worked with R. D. Laing, studied various forms of meditation, became a Jungian analyst, and founded a charitable trust, "The London Convivium for Archetypal Studies". He is the author of "Prospero's Island: The Secret Alchemy at the Heart of The Tempest".

In Oslo, he was integrated into a radical cultural environment and studied for a degree in psychology. However, he was expelled from Norway because of his experimentation with marijuana, despite his having fathered a child there with Axel Jensen's girlfriend. After returning to England he worked as general manager at the R. D. Laing experimental clinic for schizophrenics in London, where Jensen also stayed for one year. Later he studied the Tibetan language, Buddhism, therapy and meditation in India and Nepal. In 1981 he opened a private practice as a psychotherapist in England. From 1987 he led "The London Convivium for Archetypal Studies". Noel started the yearbook "Sphinx: A Journal of Archetypal Psychology and the Arts", where he published many articles.

== Bibliography ==
- 1984, Prospero's Island – the Secret Alchemy at the Heart of the Tempest, (Coventure, London)
- 1992, Archetypal Imagination – Glimpses of the Gods in Life and Art, (Lindisfarne Press, Hudson, New York)
- 1994, Kunsten og Sjelen, (Aschehoug Forlag, Oslo, Norway) – Translation of A, I. Into Norwegian
- 1997, Sofferanza e Belleza, (Milan, Moretti & Vitali) – Edited for Eva Loewe
- 1998, Maestri di Anima, (Milan, Moretti & Vitali)
