= George Johnston (novelist) =

Australian journalist, war correspondent and novelist

- Born: George Henry Johnston; 20 July 1912; Melbourne, Victoria, Australia
- Died: 22 July 1970 (aged 58); Sydney, New South Wales, Australia
- Writing career
- Language: English
- Years active: 1941–1970
- Notable works: My Brother Jack, Clean Straw for Nothing
- Notable awards: Miles Franklin Award (2)

George Henry Johnston OBE (20 July 1912 – 22 July 1970) was an Australian journalist, war correspondent and novelist, best known for My Brother Jack. He was the husband and literary collaborator of Charmian Clift.

== Life ==
George Henry Johnston was born in Melbourne and spent his childhood in the family home in Elsternwick and was educated in local secondary schools before taking up an apprenticeship as a lithographer.

He was subsequently taken on as a journalist for the Melbourne Argus newspaper. He achieved a certain fame due to his dispatches as a correspondent during World War II. With his second wife, Charmian Clift, he was posted to London as a European correspondent.

In 1951 Albert Arlen tried to engage Johnston's services as writer of his musical The Sentimental Bloke, but he was not interested. Johnston abandoned his journalism career in 1954 and moved with Clift to the Greek island of Hydra, where he began writing full-time and took part in the island's circle of international artists, including Canadian poet Leonard Cohen and Scandinavian novelists Axel Jensen and Göran Tunström. While there he contracted tuberculosis. He returned to live in Sydney in 1964.

Johnston is best known for his trilogy of semi-autobiographical novels: My Brother Jack, Clean Straw for Nothing and A Cartload of Clay.

He was the father of four children, daughters Gae (with his first wife Elsie Esme Taylor), and Shane, and two sons: Jason and the poet Martin Johnston. From the names of his children, he created the pseudonym Shane Martin, under which name he published a total of five detective novels.

George Johnston was appointed an Officer of the Order of the British Empire (OBE) in 1970 for services to literature. He died later that year from pulmonary tuberculosis, aged 58.

He is depicted in the drama television series So Long, Marianne, in which he is portrayed by Noah Taylor.

== Awards ==
- Miles Franklin Award for My Brother Jack, 1964
- Miles Franklin Award for Clean Straw for Nothing, 1969
- The Sydney Morning Herald Literary Competition for High Valley, 1948

== Bibliography ==
=== Novels ===
- Death Takes Small Bites (1948)
- The Moon at Perigee (1948)
- High Valley (1949; with Charmian Clift)
- The Big Chariot (1953; with Clift)
- The Cyprian Woman (1955)
- The Sponge Divers (1955; with Clift)
- The Sea and the Stone (1955; with Clift)
- The Darkness Outside (1959)
- Closer to the Sun (1960)
- The Far Road (1962)
- My Brother Jack (1964)
- The Far Face of the Moon (1965)
- Clean Straw for Nothing (1969)
- A Cartload of Clay (1971)

As Shane Martin

- The Saracen Shadow (1957)
- Twelve Girls in the Garden (1957)
- The Man Made of Tin (1958)
- The Myth is Murder (1959)
- A Wake for Mourning (1962)

=== Non-Fiction ===
- Battle of the Seaways: From the Athenia to the Bismarck (1941)
- Grey Gladiator: H.M.A.S. Sydney with the British Mediterranean Fleet (1941)
- Australia at War (1942)
- New Guinea Diary (1942)
- Pacific Partner (1944)
- Skyscrapers in the Mist (1946)
- Journey Through Tomorrow (1947)
- The Australians (1966)

=== Edited ===
- Images in Aspic (1965)

== Sources ==
- Kinnane, Garry, George Johnston: A Biography, Thomas Nelson 1986, and reprinted by Melbourne University Press, 1996, ISBN 0-522-84714-5.
