= Charmian Clift =

Australian writer (1923–1969)

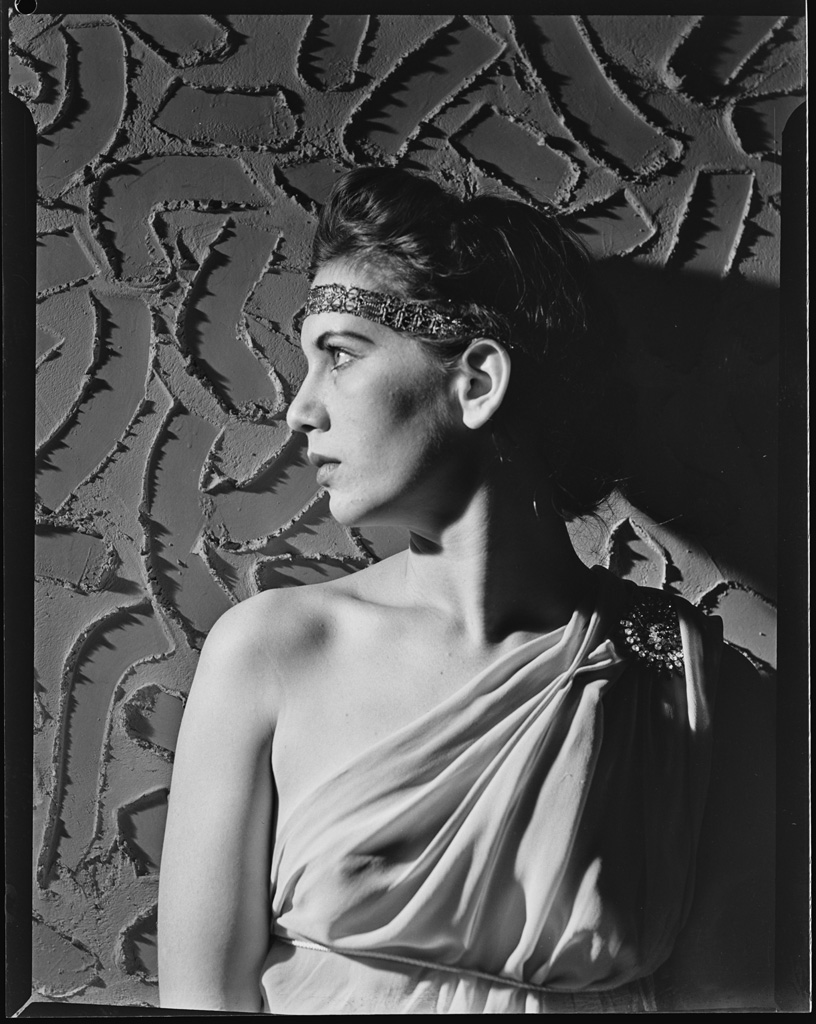
- Clift in 1941
- Born: 30 August 1923; Kiama, New South Wales, Australia
- Died: 8 July 1969 (aged 45); Sydney
- Occupation: Writer
- Spouse: George Johnston (m. 1947)
- Children: 4; including Martin Johnston

Charmian Clift (30 August 1923 – 8 July 1969) was an Australian writer. She was the second wife and literary collaborator of George Johnston.

== Early life ==
Clift was born 30 August 1923 in Kiama, a coastal town 120 kilometres south of Sydney.

In 1941 she won a Beach Girl competition run by Pix magazine and soon after moved to Sydney where she did modelling work to supplement her main job as an usherette at the Minerva Theatre. In 1942, aged 19, she became pregnant and gave up her child for adoption. Her child grew up to become Suzanne Chick, who at the age of 48 discovered who her birth mother was, and wrote a book about the experience. One of Suzanne Chick's children is the writer, survivalist, and television host Gina Chick.

In April 1943 Clift enlisted in the Australian Army at the age of 19, where she gained the rank of Bombardier in charge of a Heavy Anti-Aircraft gun, 15 Australian Heavy Battery, housed in Drummoyne. Clift was later promoted to Lieutenant in the Australian Women's Army Service (AWAS) after attending officer training in 1944 and worked at Victoria Barracks in the Directorate of Ordinance. She completed her service in May 1946.

== Career ==
After Clift and husband George Johnston's collaboration High Valley (1949) won them recognition as writers, they left Australia with their young family, working in London. In November 1954 they moved to the Greek island of Kalymnos and later Hydra to try earning a living through writing. She met the songwriter Leonard Cohen while there in 1960.

Johnston returned to Australia to receive the accolades of his Miles Franklin Award-winner My Brother Jack. Clift moved back to Sydney with their children in 1964, after which her memoirs Mermaid Singing and Peel Me a Lotus and her novel Honour's Mimic became successes.

She was also well known for the 240 essays she wrote between 1964 and 1969 for The Sydney Morning Herald and The Herald in Melbourne. They were collected in the books Images in Aspic and The World of Charmian Clift. In the meantime, Clift and Johnston's marriage was disintegrating under the pressures of their drinking habits and the problems their children had settling into life in Sydney.

On 8 July 1969, the eve of the publication of Johnston's novel Clean Straw for Nothing, Clift committed suicide by taking an overdose of barbiturates in Mosman, a Sydney suburb, while considerably affected by alcohol. Academics Paul Genoni and Tanya Dalziell suggest in their 2018 book Half the Perfect World that it was the impending publication of Johnston's novel, which Clift knew would describe her infidelities on Hydra, which prompted her to suicide. In her posthumously published article My Husband George in that month's edition of POL magazine, she wrote:

I do believe that novelists must be free to write what they like, in any way they liked to write it (and after all who but myself had urged and nagged him into it?), but the stuff of which Clean Straw for Nothing is made is largely experience in which I, too, have shared and ... have felt differently because I am a different person ...

Clift's autobiographical books Mermaid Singing and Peel Me A Lotus were reissued by Muswell Press in 2021, with new introductions written by novelist Polly Samson, whose own 2020 bestselling novel A Theatre For Dreamers is a fictionalized account of life on Hydra in the 1960s, featuring real-life characters including Clift, Johnston and Cohen.

== Death ==
Clift died by suicide on 8 July 1969. Her ashes were later scattered in the rose garden of the Northern Suburbs Crematorium in Sydney.

== Personal life ==
She met married war correspondent George Johnston in 1945 while both were enlisted in the war effort. Meeting again in 1946 while both working at The Argus, the two writers commenced an affair, for which they were both dismissed by their employer. They married in 1947 and had three children. The eldest was the poet Martin Johnston who was born in 1947; their daughter Shane was born in 1950 and Jason in 1956.

== Portrayals ==
She is depicted in the drama television series So Long, Marianne, in which she is portrayed by Anna Torv.

== Commemoration ==
In November 2023 it was announced that Clift was one of eight women chosen to be commemorated in the second round of blue plaques sponsored by the Government of New South Wales alongside, among others, Kathleen Butler, godmother of Sydney Harbour Bridge; Emma Jane Callaghan, an Aboriginal midwife and activist; philanthropist Susan Katherina Schardt; journalist Dorothy Drain; Pearl Mary Gibbs, an Aboriginal rights movement activist; and charity worker Grace Emily Munro.

== Bibliography ==
=== Novels ===
- High Valley (with George Johnston), 1949
- The Big Chariot (with Johnston), 1953
- The Sponge Divers (with Johnston), 1955
- Walk to the Paradise Gardens, 1960
- Honour's Mimic, 1964

=== Short stories and collections ===
- Strong Man from Piraeus and Other Stories, (with Johnston) 1983

=== Autobiography ===
- Mermaid Singing, Indianapolis, 1956
- Peel Me a Lotus, London, 1959

=== Screenplay ===
- My Brother Jack (1965)

=== Non-fiction ===
- Images in Aspic, Selected Essays, Sydney, 1965
- The World of Charmian Clift, Sydney, 1970
- Trouble in Lotus Land, Sydney, 1990
- Being Alone with Oneself, Sydney, 1991
- Charmian Clift: Selected Essays, 2001
