= Shanti Devi =

Indian woman (1926–1987)

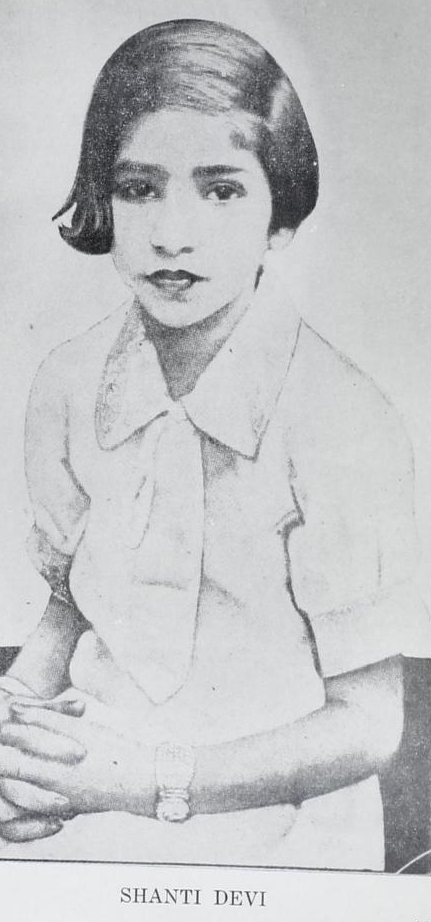
- Born: 11 December 1926; Delhi, India
- Died: 27 December 1987 (aged 61); India (disputed)
- Known for: Alleged reincarnation

Shanti Devi (11 December 1926 – 27 December 1987), also known as Lugdi Devi (18 January 1902 – 4 October 1925) in her alleged past life, was an Indian woman who claimed to remember her previous life and became the subject of reincarnation research. A commission set up by the Indian political leader Mahatma Gandhi supported her claim, while another report by researcher Bal Chand Nahata disputed it. Subsequently, several other researchers interviewed her, and published articles and books about her.

== Reincarnation claim ==
Shanti Devi was born in Delhi, India. As a young girl, she began to notice that she remembered details of a past life. According to these accounts, when she was about four years old, she told her parents that her real home was in Mathura where her husband lived, about 145 km from her home in Delhi.

Discouraged by her parents, she fled from home at the age of six, attempting to reach Mathura. Back home, she unequivocally stated in school that she was married and had died ten days after giving birth to a child. Interviewed by her teacher and headmaster, she used words from the Mathura dialect and divulged the name of her merchant husband, "Kedarnath Chaube". The headmaster managed to locate a merchant by the name of Kedar Nath in Mathura who had lost his wife, Lugdi Devi, seven years earlier, ten days after having given birth to a son. Kedar Nath travelled to Delhi, pretending to be his brother, but Shanti Devi immediately recognized him and Lugdi Devi's son. As she knew several details of Kedar Nath's life with his wife, he was soon convinced that Shanti Devi was indeed the reincarnation of Lugdi Devi.

== Investigation ==
The case was brought to the attention of Mahatma Gandhi who set up a commission to investigate. The commission traveled with Shanti Devi to Mathura, arriving on 15 November 1935. There she recognized several family members, including the grandfather of Lugdi Devi. She found out that Kedar Nath had neglected to keep a number of promises he had made to Lugdi Devi on her deathbed. She then travelled home with her parents. The commission's report, published in 1936, concluded that Shanti Devi was indeed the reincarnation of Lugdi Devi.

Two further reports were written at the time. The report by Bal Chand Nahata was published as a Hindi booklet by the name Punarjanma Ki Paryalochana. In this, he stated that "Whatever material that has come before us, does not warrant us to conclude that Shanti Devi has former life recollections or that this case proves reincarnation". This argument was disputed by Indra Sen, a devotee of Sri Aurobindo, in an article later. A further report, based on interviews conducted in 1936, was published in 1952 and made available to parapsychologists.

== Later life ==
Shanti Devi did not marry. She told her story again at the end of the 1950s, and once more in 1986 when she was interviewed by Ian Stevenson and K.S. Rawat. In this interview, she also related her near death experiences when Lugdi Devi died. Rawat continued his investigations in 1987, and the last interview took place only four days before her death on 27 December 1987.

== See also ==
- Reincarnation research
