= Göran Tunström =

Swedish writer (1937–2000)

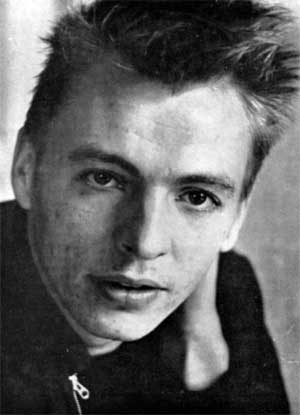
- Tunström around 1960
- Born: 14 May 1937; Karlstad, Sweden
- Died: 5 February 2000 (aged 62); Stockholm, Sweden
- Occupation: Writer
- Spouse: Lena Cronqvist (m. 1964)
- Children: 1
- Writing career
- Period: 1960–2000
- Genres: Biography, novel, poem, short story
- Notable works: Juloratoriet (The Christmas Oratorio); Tjuven (The Thief)
- Literary movement: Modernism

Göran Tunström (14 May 1937 – 5 February 2000) was a Swedish author. He grew up in Sunne, Värmland County. Tunström's style is personal and intimate, and has a clear autobiographical tone. Although active as an established author for nearly four decades, it was particularly after his Juloratoriet (The Christmas Oratorio) was adapted as a movie in 1996 that he became widely known to the (Swedish) public. He participated in the Oslo International Poetry Festival.

He was married to artist Lena Cronqvist, and was the father of theatre and film director Linus Tunström.

== Biography ==
Tunström, the son of a pastor was raised in Sunne, Värmland County. He was twelve years old when his father died. Tunström made his debut as a writer with the poetry collection Inringning published in 1958 when he was 21 years old.

Inspired by the example of Norwegian author Axel Jensen Tunström moved to the Greek island of Hydra, in late 1957 or early 1958 and rented a house. He subsequently became friends with Jensen and his girlfriend, later wife Marianne Ihlen. Jensen was to model the character of Lorenzo in his 1961 novel Joacim on Tunström. He also became friends with the Canadian singer, writer and poet Leonard Cohen after his move to the island in 1960.

Following his debut Tunström subsequently published other collections of poems, novels, plays and short stories.

In 1983, Tunström made his breakthrough with Juloratoriet which depicted the sufferings and tribulations of three generations of the Nordensson family in Sweden in the 20th century. A major critical success it was translated into several languages. Juloratoriet was adapted into a film version in 1996. The last novel published during his lifetime, Berömda män som varit i Sunne, won the August Prize in 1998.

Tunström died at the age of 62 at his home in Stockholm on 5 February 2000.

Tunström left behind an unfinished manuscript which he had begun in 1996. It was published in 2002 as Försök med ett århundrade.

In 2021 Birgitta Holm wrote a biography of Tunström titled Vår ljusaste tragiker: Göran Tunströms textvärld.

== Bibliography ==
Tunström wrote fifteen novels and ten poetry collections, as well as short stories, travelogues and radio plays. Tunström is considered a major writer of the Swedish literature of the late 20th century and is recognized for his complex exploration of interpersonal relationships through a style that is reminiscent of Gabriel García Márquez and which is sometimes compared to magical realism.

The author's childhood home town of Sunne plays an important role in his works; six of his novels are located there. Swedish as well as international celebrities appear in the town and take part in the story. The cover paintings of his first two books about Sunne (De heliga geograferna and Guddöttrarna) are made by the painter Tage Åsén from the same town.

=== Novels ===
- 1960: Karantän
- 1962: Maskrosbollen
- 1964: Familjeliv
- 1967: Hallonfallet
- 1973: De heliga geograferna
- 1975: Stormunnens bön
- 1975: Guddöttrarna
- 1976: Prästungen
- 1978: Ökenbrevet (translated title: The Letter from the Wilderness)
- 1983: Juloratoriet (translated title: The Christmas Oratorio)
- 1985: Hallonfallet (previously published in 1967 under the pseudonym Paul Badura Mörk)
- 1986: Tjuven (translated title: The Thief)
- 1996: Skimmer (translated title: Glittering)
- 1998: Berömda män som varit i Sunne
- 2002: Försök med ett århundrade

=== Poetry collections ===
- 1958: Inringning
- 1960: Två vindar
- 1962: Nymålat
- 1965: Om förtröstan
- 1966: De andra de till hälften synliga
- 1969: Samtal med marken
- 1975: Svartsjukans sånger
- 1976: Sandro Botticellis dikter
- 1978: Dikter till Lena
- 1980: Sorgesånger

=== Other works ===
- 1978: Mitt indiska ritblock. Together with Lena Cronqvist.
- 1984: Indien - en vinterresa. Collection of travel stories.
- 1987: Chang Eng. A play about the original Siamese twins.
- 1991: Det sanna livet. Short story collection.
- 1993: Under tiden. Book of thoughts.
- 2000: Krönikor. This book contains a selection of Tunström's previously published chronicles.
- 2003: Försök med ett århundrade (posthumously)

== Awards ==
Tunström has been awarded a number of literary awards, including Svenska Dagbladet's Literature Prize in 1976, the Nordic Council Literature Prize in 1984, the Selma Lagerlöf Prize in 1987, the Nils Ferlin Prize in 1998 and in that same year the August Prize for Berömda män som varit i Sunne.
