= Olav Angell =

Norwegian poet, novelist, writer, translator, editor and jazz musician

- Born: 4 August 1932; Trondheim
- Died: 23 September 2018 (aged 86)
- Occupations: Poet, novelist, science fiction writer, crime fiction writer, translator, anthology editor and jazz musician
- Awards: Riksmål Society Literature Prize (2002); Bastian Prize (2006)

Olav Angell (4 August 1932 – 23 September 2018) was a Norwegian poet, novelist, science fiction writer, crime fiction writer, translator, anthology editor and jazz musician.

Angell was born in Trondheim, and grew up in Oslo. He made his literary debut in 1966 with the poetry collection Burlesk. He wrote the science fiction novel Den elektriske blomsten in 1968 and the crime novel Perdido, Perdido... in 1975. The novel Topkapi. En historie om utroskap came in 1981. He issued the poetry collections Tiden er en korketrekker som forvandler kjærligheten til konkylier (1982) and Neptuns døtre (1986). He has written three memoir books, Oslo i skumring (1991), Oslo ved midnatt (1997) and Oslo i demring (2002). In the book Snapshots (1994) Angell describes some of his meetings with writers, musicians and actors. A collection of his texts, Det spesielle grep om fjærpennen, edited by Jón Sveinbjørn Jónsson, came in 2007.

Angell was among the organizers of Oslo International Poetry Festival in the 1980s. He was awarded the Riksmål Society Literature Prize in 2002. He received the Arts Council Norway's Translator's Award for his translation of James Joyce's novel Ulysses in 1992. He has also translated Raymond Chandler's crime novel The Big Sleep, and Jack Kerouac's novel On the Road into the Norwegian language. In 2006 he received the Bastian Prize for his translation work.

Angell was a member of the editorial board of the literary magazine Profil from 1967 to 1968, and at the editorial board of the literary magazine Vinduet from 1973 to 1974.

Angell has also been chairman for Norsk Jazzforbund.

Awards
Preceded by Bård Kranstad	Recipient of the Bastian Prize; 2006	Succeeded by Grete Kleppen
