= List of 2005 albums =

The following is a list of albums, EPs, and mixtapes released in 2005. These albums are (1) original, i.e. excluding reissues, remasters, and compilations of previously released recordings, and (2) notable, defined as having received significant coverage from reliable sources independent of the subject.

For additional information about bands formed, reformed, disbanded, or on hiatus, for deaths of musicians, and for links to musical awards, see 2005 in music.

== First quarter ==
=== January ===
List of albums released in January 2005
Go to: January | February | March | April | May | June | July | August | September | October | November | December | Back to top
Release date	Artist	Album	Genre	Label	Ref.
January 4	Ol' Dirty Bastard	Osirus	Hip-hop	Sure Shot Recordings	
January 5	Firewind	Forged by Fire	Power metal	Century Media	
January 10	Adam Green	Gemstones	Anti-folk, alternative country	Rough Trade	
January 10	Kreator	Enemy of God	Thrash metal	SPV/Steamhammer	
January 10	Tunng	Mother's Daughter and Other Songs	Folktronica	Static Caravan	
January 11	Cass McCombs	PREfection		4AD	
January 11	The Fiery Furnaces	EP	Indie rock	Rough Trade	
January 11	Living Colour	Live from CBGB's	Hard rock, funk, thrash metal	Epic	
January 11	Trembling Blue Stars	The Seven Autumn Flowers		Bar/None	
January 11	Various artists	Coach Carter: Music from the Motion Picture	Hip-hop, R&B	Capitol	
January 13	The Chemical Brothers	Push the Button	Electronica	Virgin, Freestyle Dust, EMI	
January 17	Arena	Pepper's Ghost	Progressive rock	Inside Out Music	
January 17	Grave Digger	The Last Supper	Heavy metal	Nuclear Blast	
January 17	Hood	Outside Closer	Indie rock, glitch pop, experimental pop	Domino	
January 18	Black Mountain	Black Mountain	Psychedelic rock, alternative rock, stoner rock	Jagjaguwar	
January 18	Fozzy	All That Remains	Heavy metal, hard rock, alternative metal	Ash Records	
January 18	The Game	The Documentary	West Coast hip-hop, gangsta rap	Aftermath, G-Unit, Interscope	
January 24	Apocalyptica	Apocalyptica	Symphonic metal, neoclassical metal, progressive metal	Universal Music Germany, Vertigo	
January 24	Erasure	Nightbird	Synth-pop	Mute	
January 24	Glenn Hughes	Soul Mover	Hard rock, blue-eyed soul, funk rock	Frontiers, Yamaha, Sanctuary	
January 24	LCD Soundsystem	LCD Soundsystem	Dance-punk, electronica, indie rock	DFA, Capitol, EMI	
January 24	Lou Barlow	Emoh	Folk rock, lo-fi	Merge, Domino	
January 24	M83	Before the Dawn Heals Us	Electronic, shoegaze, dream pop	Mute, Virgin, Gooom	
January 24	Mercury Rev	The Secret Migration	Alternative rock	V2	
January 25	Adrian Belew	Side One	Rock	Sanctuary	
January 25	...And You Will Know Us by the Trail of Dead	Worlds Apart	Alternative rock, art rock, indie rock	Interscope	
January 25	Ani DiFranco	Knuckle Down	Indie rock, folk rock	Righteous Babe	
January 25	Bonnie 'Prince' Billy and Matt Sweeney	Superwolf		Drag City	
January 25	Bright Eyes	Digital Ash in a Digital Urn	Electronica, pop, synth-pop	Saddle Creek	
January 25	Bright Eyes	I'm Wide Awake, It's Morning	Folk, indie folk, folk rock	Saddle Creek	
January 25	Dark Tranquillity	Character	Melodic death metal	Century Media	
January 25	Geto Boys	The Foundation	Hip-hop	J. Prince, Rap-A-Lot 4 Life, Asylum	
January 25	Jimmy Chamberlin Complex	Life Begins Again	Jazz fusion, alternative rock	Sanctuary	
January 25	Kenny Chesney	Be as You Are (Songs from an Old Blue Chair)	Country, Gulf and Western	BNA	
January 25	LeAnn Rimes	This Woman	Country pop	Asylum, Curb	
January 25	Low	The Great Destroyer	Slowcore	Sub Pop	
January 25	Magnapop	Mouthfeel	Pop-punk, pop rock, power pop	Daemon	
January 25	The Octopus Project	One Ten Hundred Thousand Million	Indie rock, electronica	Peek-A-Boo	
January 25	Paul Wall and Chamillionaire	Controversy Sells	Hip-hop	Paid in Full	
January 25	Pedestrian	Volume One: UnIndian Songs	Hip-hop	Anticon	
January 25	Plain White T's	All That We Needed	Pop-punk, pop rock, power pop	Fearless	
January 25	Sharon Jones & the Dap-Kings	Naturally	Soul, funk	Daptone	
January 25	Six Organs of Admittance	School of the Flower	Experimental rock	Drag City	
January 25	Spock's Beard	Octane	Progressive rock	Inside Out Music	
January 28	Roots Manuva	Awfully Deep	Hip-hop	Big Dada	
January 31	Athlete	Tourist	Soft rock	Parlophone	
January 31	Feeder	Pushing the Senses	Alternative rock, power pop, post-Britpop	Echo	
January 31	Hatesphere	The Killing	Death metal, thrash metal	SPV GmbH	
January 31	Masterplan	Aeronautics	Power metal	AFM	

=== February ===
List of albums released in February 2005
Go to: January | February | March | April | May | June | July | August | September | October | November | December | Back to top
Release date	Artist	Album	Genre	Label	Ref.
February 1	Anberlin	Never Take Friendship Personal	Alternative rock, emo	Tooth & Nail	
February 1	Antony and the Johnsons	I Am a Bird Now	Chamber pop	Secretly Canadian	
February 1	Brazilian Girls	Brazilian Girls	Electronic, pop	Verve	
February 1	High on Fire	Blessed Black Wings	Stoner metal, sludge metal	Relapse	
February 1	John Frusciante	Curtains	Acoustic, rock, indie folk	Record Collection	
February 1	Kelly Joe Phelps	Tap the Red Cane Whirlwind	Blues, country blues	Rykodisc	
February 1	Korpiklaani	Voice of Wilderness	Folk metal	Napalm	
February 1	Mötley Crüe	Red, White & Crüe	Heavy metal, glam metal	Mötley	
February 1	Seventh Day Slumber	Once upon a Shattered Life	Christian rock	BEC Recordings	
February 1	Tristania	Ashes	Gothic metal	SPV/Steamhammer	
February 1	Unwritten Law	Here's to the Mourning	Punk rock	Lava	
February 1	WarCry	¿Dónde Está La Luz?	Heavy metal, power metal	Jaus, Avispa	
February 2	Bloc Party	Silent Alarm	Indie rock, post-punk revival, dance-punk	Wichita	
February 5	Immolation	Harnessing Ruin	Death metal	Listenable	
February 7	Karnivool	Themata	Nu metal, progressive metal, alternative metal	Bieler Bros.	
February 7	Little Barrie	We Are Little Barrie	Alternative rock, UK R&B revival	PIAS, Artemis	
February 8	3 Doors Down	Seventeen Days	Alternative rock, post-grunge	Universal	
February 8	The Academy Is...	Almost Here	Pop-punk, emo pop, alternative rock	Fueled by Ramen	
February 8	Andrew Bird	Andrew Bird & the Mysterious Production of Eggs	Baroque pop, indie folk	Righteous Babe	
February 8	Brian McKnight	Gemini		Motown	
February 8	Crowbar	Lifesblood for the Downtrodden	Sludge metal	Candlelight	
February 8	Dälek	Absence		Ipecac	
February 8	Eisley	Room Noises	Indie rock	Reprise	
February 8	The Golden Republic	The Golden Republic	Rock	Astralwerks	
February 8	Lee Ann Womack	There's More Where That Came From	Neotraditional country	MCA Nashville	
February 8	Michael Bublé	It's Time	Vocal jazz, traditional pop	143, Reprise	
February 8	Mike Ladd	Negrophilia: The Album	Hip-hop, jazz	Thirsty Ear	
February 8	Rapper Big Pooh	Sleepers	Hip-hop	6 Hole Records, Caroline	
February 8	Sage Francis	A Healthy Distrust	Hip-hop	Epitaph	
February 11	The Mars Volta	Frances the Mute	Progressive rock	Gold Standard Laboratories	
February 14	The Boy Least Likely To	The Best Party Ever	Twee pop	Too Young to Die	
February 14	Electric Six	Señor Smoke	Alternative rock, funk rock	Warner Bros., Metropolis	
February 15	American Head Charge	The Feeding	Nu metal, alternative metal, industrial metal	DRT Entertainment, Nitrus	
February 15	Goldfinger	Disconnection Notice	Pop-punk, punk rock, alternative rock	Maverick	
February 15	Mary Gauthier	Mercy Now	Country, folk	Lost Highway	
February 15	The Sound of Animals Fighting	Tiger and the Duke	Experimental rock	Stars and Satellites Records	
February 15	Stellar Kart	All Gas. No Brake.	Pop-punk, punk rock, Christian rock	Word	
February 15	They Might Be Giants	Here Come the ABCs	Children's music	Disney Sound, Idlewild Records	
February 20	Tori Amos	The Beekeeper	Alternative rock	Epic	
February 21	Communic	Conspiracy in Mind	Progressive metal, power metal	Nuclear Blast	
February 21	Doves	Some Cities	Indie rock	Heavenly	
February 21	The Kills	No Wow		Domino, RCA, Rough Trade	
February 21	Nightrage	Descent into Chaos	Melodic death metal	Century Media	
February 22	Aesop Rock	Fast Cars, Danger, Fire and Knives	Hip-hop	Definitive Jux	
February 22	The Afters	I Wish We All Could Win	Christian rock	INO, Epic	
February 22	Armor for Sleep	What to Do When You Are Dead	Emo, progressive rock, punk rock	Equal Vision	
February 22	Ben Lee	Awake Is the New Sleep	Indie pop	New West, Inertia Distribution	
February 22	Bone Brothers	Bone Brothers	Hip-hop, gangsta rap	Koch	
February 22	Busdriver	Fear of a Black Tangent	Progressive rap	Mush	
February 22	Chely Wright	The Metropolitan Hotel	Country	Painted Red, Dualtone	
February 22	Comeback Kid	Wake the Dead	Hardcore punk	Victory	
February 22	Crooked Fingers	Dignity and Shame	Indie rock	Merge	
February 22	David S. Ware Quartets	Live in the World	Free jazz	Thirsty Ear	
February 22	Enon	Lost Marbles and Exploded Evidence	Post-punk, noise pop, synth-pop	Touch and Go	
February 22	Heartless Bastards	Stairs and Elevators		Fat Possum	
February 22	M. Ward	Transistor Radio	Folk	Merge, Matador	
February 22	Omarion	O	R&B, hip-hop	Epic, Sony Urban	
February 22	Roger Miret and the Disasters	1984	Punk rock, Oi!, street punk	Hellcat	
February 22	Sole	Live from Rome	Hip-hop	Anticon	
February 22	Steve Vai	Real Illusions: Reflections	Instrumental rock, progressive metal, heavy metal	Epic	
February 22	Thievery Corporation	The Cosmic Game	Dub, trip hop, downtempo	ESL	
February 22	TRU	The Truth	Southern hip-hop, gangsta rap	The New No Limit, Koch	
February 22	William Elliott Whitmore	Ashes to Dust	Alternative country	Southern	

=== March ===
List of albums released in March 2005
Go to: January | February | March | April | May | June | July | August | September | October | November | December | Back to top
Release date	Artist	Album	Genre	Label	Ref.
March 1	Emanuel	Soundtrack to a Headrush	Emo	Vagrant	
March 1	Ivy	In the Clear	Indie pop, indie rock	Nettwerk	
March 1	Jack Johnson	In Between Dreams	Folk rock, acoustic	Brushfire	
March 1	Jennifer Lopez	Rebirth	Dance, hip-hop, R&B	Epic	
March 1	Jessi Alexander	Honeysuckle Sweet	Country	Columbia	
March 1	Judas Priest	Angel of Retribution	Heavy metal	Sony BMG, Epic	
March 1	Kathleen Edwards	Back to Me	Country	MapleMusic, Zoë	
March 1	Kutless	Strong Tower	Christian rock, alternative rock, contemporary worship music	BEC	
March 1	Norma Jean	O' God, the Aftermath	Metalcore, mathcore	Solid State, Abacus, EMI	
March 1	Shooter Jennings	Put the "O" Back in Country	Country, Southern rock	Universal South	
March 1	Solomon Burke	Make Do with What You Got	R&B	Shout! Factory, Sony BMG	
March 3	50 Cent	The Massacre	Hardcore hip-hop, gangsta rap	Shady, Aftermath, Interscope	
March 4	HammerFall	Chapter V: Unbent, Unbowed, Unbroken	Heavy metal, power metal	Nuclear Blast	
March 7	Idlewild	Warnings/Promises	College rock, folk rock	Parlophone	
March 7	Kaiser Chiefs	Employment	Alternative rock, indie rock, post-punk revival	B-Unique	
March 8	Black Label Society	Mafia	Heavy metal, Southern metal, groove metal	Artemis	
March 8	Craig Morgan	My Kind of Livin'	Country	Broken Bow	
March 8	Deana Carter	The Story of My Life	Country	Vanguard	
March 8	The Evens	The Evens	Indie rock, folk rock, post-hardcore	Dischord	
March 8	Gratitude	Gratitude	Emo	Atlantic	
March 8	Impaled	Death After Life		Century Media	
March 8	Into the Moat	The Design	Mathcore, metalcore	Metal Blade	
March 8	Kaddisfly	Buy Our Intention; We'll Buy You a Unicorn		Hopeless	
March 8	Living Legends	Classic	Alternative hip-hop	Legendary Music	
March 8	Marcus Miller	Silver Rain	Jazz fusion	Koch	
March 8	MF Doom	Live from Planet X	Hip-hop	Nature Sounds	
March 8	Novembers Doom	The Pale Haunt Departure	Death-doom, gothic metal	The End	
March 8	Pigeon John	Sings the Blues	Hip-hop	Basement Records	
March 8	Sam Prekop	Who's Your New Professor	Post-rock	Thrill Jockey	
March 8	Soilwork	Stabbing the Drama	Melodic death metal, alternative metal, metalcore	Nuclear Blast	
March 8	Sonicflood	This Generation	Christian rock	INO	
March 9	Dir En Grey	Withering to Death	Gothic metal, alternative metal, industrial metal	Free-Will, Sony Music Entertainment Japan, Gan-Shin	
March 14	Al Green	Everything's OK	Soul, Rhythm and blues	Blue Note	
March 14	The Bravery	The Bravery	Indie rock, post-punk revival, dance-punk	Island	
March 14	Brendan Benson	The Alternative to Love	Rock	V2	
March 14	Daft Punk	Human After All	Dance-rock	Virgin	
March 14	Moby	Hotel	Alternative rock, electronica, downtempo	V2, Mute	
March 14	Stereophonics	Language. Sex. Violence. Other?	Rock, Britpop	V2	
March 14	Venetian Snares	Rossz Csillag Alatt Született	Breakcore	Planet Mu	
March 15	Baby Bash	Super Saucy	Hip-hop	Universal	
March 15	Brooke Valentine	Chain Letter	R&B	Virgin, Subliminal Entertainment	
March 15	Cephalic Carnage	Anomalies	Deathgrind, technical death metal	Relapse	
March 15	Dr. Dog	Easy Beat	Psychedelic rock	Park the Van	
March 15	Great Lake Swimmers	Bodies and Minds		Weewerk	
March 15	Kamelot	The Black Halo	Power metal, symphonic metal, heavy metal	SPV/Steamhammer	
March 15	Miranda Lambert	Kerosene	Country	Epic Nashville	
March 15	Origin	Echoes of Decimation	Technical death metal	Relapse	
March 15	Trivium	Ascendancy	Metalcore, thrash metal	Roadrunner	
March 15	ZOEgirl	Room to Breathe	Pop rock, CCM	Sparrow	
March 17	Kill Memory Crash	American Automatic	Electronic, industrial techno	Ghostly International	
March 17	Paradise Lost	Paradise Lost	Gothic metal, gothic rock	BMG, GUN	
March 21	Angels of Light	The Angels of Light Sing 'Other People'	Indie folk	Young God	
March 21	Louis XIV	The Best Little Secrets Are Kept	Alternative rock, garage rock, glam rock	Atlantic	
March 21	Ocean Colour Scene	A Hyperactive Workout for the Flying Squad	Alternative rock	Sanctuary	
March 21	Prefuse 73	Surrounded by Silence	Electronica, hip-hop	Warp	
March 21	Starbreaker	Starbreaker	Hard rock, heavy metal	Frontiers Music	
March 21	Trust Company	True Parallels	Nu metal, alternative metal, post-grunge	Geffen	
March 21	Tweet	It's Me Again	R&B, soul, neo soul	The Goldmind, Atlantic	
March 22	Billy Idol	Devil's Playground	Punk rock, hard rock, pop-punk	Sanctuary	
March 22	C-Murder	The Truest Shit I Ever Said	Gangsta rap, hardcore hip-hop	TRU Records, Koch	
March 22	Daedelus	Exquisite Corpse	Electronic	Mush, Ninja Tune	
March 22	The Decemberists	Picaresque	Indie rock, folk rock, baroque pop	Kill Rock Stars	
March 22	Fog	10th Avenue Freakout	Indie rock	Lex	
March 22	Frankie J	The One	Pop	Columbia	
March 22	Jars of Clay	Redemption Songs	Christian rock, folk rock	Essential	
March 22	Kylesa	To Walk a Middle Course	Sludge metal, alternative metal, stoner rock	Proshetic	
March 22	Lifehouse	Lifehouse	Pop rock, alternative rock	Geffen	
March 22	Likwit Junkies (Defari and DJ Babu)	The L.J.'s	Hip-hop	ABB Records	
March 22	Maia Sharp	Fine Upstanding Citizen	Pop, rock	Koch	
March 22	M.I.A.	Arular	World, hip-hop, dancehall	XL, Interscope	
March 22	Overkill	ReliXIV		Spitfire	
March 22	The Perceptionists	Black Dialogue	Hip-hop	Definitive Jux	
March 22	Queens of the Stone Age	Lullabies to Paralyze	Stoner rock, alternative rock	Interscope	
March 22	Strapping Young Lad	Alien	Industrial metal, thrash metal, industrial metal	Hevy Devy, Century Media	
March 22	Trace Adkins	Songs About Me	Country, Southern rock	Capitol Nashville	
March 22	William Parker	Luc's Lantern	Jazz	Thirsty Ear	
March 24	Porcupine Tree	Deadwing	Progressive rock, progressive metal, alternative metal	Lava	
March 28	New Order	Waiting for the Sirens' Call	Alternative rock, synth-pop	London, Warner Bros.	
March 29	Beanie Sigel	The B. Coming	Hip-hop	Dame Dash, Def Jam	
March 29	Beck	Guero	Alternative rock, alternative hip-hop, sampledelia	Interscope	
March 29	Bloodsimple	A Cruel World	Nu metal, alternative metal, metalcore	Bullygoat Records, Reprise	
March 29	Edan	Beauty and the Beat	Hip-hop, psychedelic rap	Lewis	
March 29	Extol	The Blueprint Dives	Progressive metal, extreme metal, hard rock	Solid State	
March 29	Hammock	Kenotic	Post-rock, ambient, shoegaze	Hammock Music	
March 29	James LaBrie	Elements of Persuasion	Alternative metal, progressive metal	Inside Out	
March 29	Mae	The Everglow	Indie rock, emo	Tooth & Nail	
March 29	Morrissey	Live at Earls Court	Alternative rock	Sanctuary	
March 29	Reggie and the Full Effect	Songs Not to Get Married To	Post-hardcore, metalcore, pop-punk	Vagrant	
March 29	Superchick	Beauty from Pain	Christian rock, garage rock, pop-punk	Inpop	
March 29	Theory of a Deadman	Gasoline	Hard rock, post-grunge, alternative metal	604, Roadrunner	
March 29	Three 6 Mafia	Choices II: The Setup	Hip-hop	Hypnotize Minds, Columbia, Sony Urban	
March 29	Will Smith	Lost and Found	Hip-hop, pop rap	Overbrook, Interscope	
March 30	Millencolin	Kingwood	Punk rock, skate punk, pop-punk	Burning Heart, Epitaph	

== Second quarter ==
=== April ===
List of albums released in April 2005
Go to: January | February | March | April | May | June | July | August | September | October | November | December | Back to top
Release date	Artist	Album	Genre	Label	Ref.
April 4	Better Than Ezra	Before the Robots	Alternative rock, country rock, Southern rock	Artemis	
April 4	British Sea Power	Open Season	Indie rock, post-punk revival	Rough Trade	
April 4	Hot Hot Heat	Elevator	Indie rock	Sire	
April 4	Natalie Imbruglia	Counting Down the Days	Pop rock	Brightside Recordings	
April 4	Nerina Pallot	Fires	Pop rock, alternative rock	Idaho Records, 14th Floor	
April 4	Tom Vek	We Have Sound	Indietronica, indie rock, dance-punk	Tummy Touch, Go! Beat, Startime International	
April 4	Vitalic	OK Cowboy	Electro house	Citizen Records, PIAS	
April 4	VNV Nation	Matter + Form	Futurepop, electro-industrial, electropop	Metropolis	
April 5	Adema	Planets	Alternative metal, post-grunge, nu metal	Earache	
April 5	Architecture in Helsinki	In Case We Die	Indie pop	Bar/None, Moshi Moshi	
April 5	The Books	Lost and Safe	Folktronica, post-rock	Tomlab	
April 5	Corrosion of Conformity	In the Arms of God	Stoner rock, sludge metal, Southern metal	Sanctuary	
April 5	Despised Icon	The Healing Process	Deathcore	Century Media	
April 5	Faith Evans	The First Lady	R&B	Capitol	
April 5	Fantômas	Suspended Animation	Avant-garde metal, plunderphonics, grindcore	Ipecac	
April 5	Fischerspooner	Odyssey	Electroclash, synth-pop, electropop	EMI, Capitol	
April 5	Lisa Marie Presley	Now What	Rock, pop rock	Capitol	
April 5	Okkervil River	Black Sheep Boy	Indie rock, folk rock	Jagjaguwar	
April 5	Reel Big Fish	We're Not Happy 'til You're Not Happy	Ska punk	Mojo, Jive, Zomba	
April 5	The Residents	Animal Lover		Mute, EMI	
April 5	Serena Ryder	Unlikely Emergency	Alternative pop	Redbird Records	
April 5	A Static Lullaby	Faso Latido	Post-hardcore, alternative rock	Columbia	
April 5	Tonedeff	Archetype	Hip-hop	QN5 Music	
April 5	Vast Aire and Mighty Mi	The Best Damn Rap Show	Hip-hop	Eastern Conference	
April 11	Garbage	Bleed Like Me	Alternative rock, post-grunge, electronic rock	A&E, Warner Bros.	
April 11	I Am Kloot	Gods and Monsters	Indie rock	The Echo Label	
April 11	The Locust	Safety Second, Body Last	Mathcore, noise rock, avant-garde metal	Ipecac, Southern	
April 11	Marc Leclair	Musique pour 3 Femmes Enceintes		Mutek Records	
April 11	Melanie C	Beautiful Intentions	Pop rock, rock	Red Girl Records	
April 12	Against All Authority and Common Rider	Against All Authority / Common Rider	Punk rock, ska punk	Hopeless	
April 12	American Hi-Fi	Hearts on Parade	Alternative rock, power pop, pop-punk	Maverick	
April 12	Cog	The New Normal	Progressive rock	Difrnt Music	
April 12	Gatsbys American Dream	Volcano	Progressive rock, indie rock, pop-punk	Fearless	
April 12	Mariah Carey	The Emancipation of Mimi	R&B, pop, hip-hop	Island Def Jam	
April 12	Martha Wainwright	Martha Wainwright	Folk, pop	MapleMusic, Zoë	
April 12	Mindless Self Indulgence	You'll Rebel to Anything	Industrial rock, digital hardcore, electro-industrial	Metropolis	
April 12	Mudvayne	Lost and Found	Alternative metal, nu metal, hard rock	Epic	
April 12	The National	Alligator	Indie rock, post-punk revival	Beggars Banquet	
April 12	of Montreal	The Sunlandic Twins	Indie pop, funk, synth-pop	Polyvinyl	
April 15	Amy Ray	Prom	Folk rock	Daemon Records	
April 15	Jane Ira Bloom	Like Silver, Like Song	Jazz	ArtistShare	
April 18	Autechre	Untilted	Electronic, IDM, glitch	Warp	
April 18	Caribou	The Milk of Human Kindness	Folktronica	The Leaf Label, Domino	
April 18	yourcodenameis:milo	Ignoto	Post-hardcore	Fiction, Polydor	
April 19	Anna Nalick	Wreck of the Day	Pop rock	Columbia	
April 19	The Cat Empire	Two Shoes	Latin, ska, jazz	Virgin	
April 19	Circa Survive	Juturna	Post-hardcore, emo, alternative rock	Equal Vision	
April 19	Loudon Wainwright III	Here Come the Choppers	Folk rock	Sovereign Records	
April 19	Mary Timony	Ex Hex	Math rock	Lookout	
April 19	Mike Jones	Who Is Mike Jones?	Hip-hop	Swishahouse, Asylum, Warner Bros.	
April 19	Outlawz	Outlaw 4 Life: 2005 A.P.	Gangsta rap	33rd Street, 1Nation	
April 19	Rob Thomas	...Something to Be	Pop rock, alternative rock	Atlantic	
April 19	Stace England	Greetings from Cairo, Illinois	Folk, rock, country	Gnashville Sounds Records	
April 19	Steel Train	Twilight Tales from the Prairies of the Sun		Drive-Thru	
April 19	Z-Trip	Shifting Gears	Hip-hop	Hollywood	
April 19	Zion I	True & Livin'	Hip-hop	Live Up Records	
April 25	Ben Folds	Songs for Silverman	Alternative rock	Sony Music, Epic	
April 25	Napalm Death	The Code Is Red...Long Live the Code	Grindcore, death metal	Century Media	
April 25	Robert Plant & The Strange Sensation	Mighty ReArranger	Progressive rock, hard rock, worldbeat	Sanctuary, Es Paranza	
April 25	Van der Graaf Generator	Present	Progressive rock, art rock	Charisma	
April 26	Acceptance	Phantoms	Pop-punk, emo, alternative rock	Columbia	
April 26	Amerie	Touch	R&B	Columbia, Sony Urban, Richcraft	
April 26	Bruce Springsteen	Devils & Dust	Rock, folk rock	Columbia	
April 26	Caesars	Paper Tigers	Indie rock	Toshiba-EMI, Virgin, Astralwerks	
April 26	Eels	Blinking Lights and Other Revelations	Indie rock	Vagrant	
April 26	Family Guy	Family Guy: Live in Vegas	Comedy jazz	Geffen	
April 26	Jim Verraros	Rollercoaster	Pop rock, dance	Koch	
April 26	Jo Dee Messina	Delicious Surprise	Country	Curb	
April 26	Johnathan Rice	Trouble Is Real		One Little Indian	
April 26	Lyrics Born	Same !@$ Different Day	Hip-hop	Quannum Projects	
April 26	The Mountain Goats	The Sunset Tree	Folk rock	4AD	
April 26	Opiate for the Masses	The Spore		Warcon	
April 26	Russell Allen	Atomic Soul	Hard rock, heavy metal	Inside Out Music	
April 26	Unsane	Blood Run	Noise rock, post-hardcore, alternative metal	Relapse	
April 27	Robyn	Robyn	Synth-pop, dance-pop, Europop	Konichiwa	

=== May ===
List of albums released in May 2005
Go to: January | February | March | April | May | June | July | August | September | October | November | December | Back to top
Release date	Artist	Album	Genre	Label	Ref.
May 2	Fat Freddy's Drop	Based on a True Story	Dub	The Drop	
May 2	Lacrimosa	Lichtgestalt	Gothic metal	Hall of Sermon	
May 2	Limp Bizkit	The Unquestionable Truth (Part 1)	Nu metal, alternative metal, rap metal	Flip, Geffen	
May 3	13 & God	13 & God	Hip-hop, indie rock, electronica	Anticon, Alien Transistor	
May 3	Aimee Mann	The Forgotten Arm	Pop, rock	SuperEgo Records	
May 3	Fall Out Boy	From Under the Cork Tree	Pop-punk, emo	Island	
May 3	The Go-Betweens	Oceans Apart	Rock	LO-MAX Records, EMI	
May 3	The Hold Steady	Separation Sunday	Indie rock, post-punk revival, heartland rock	Frenchkiss	
May 3	Joe Perry	Joe Perry	Hard rock, instrumental rock	Sony BMG	
May 3	John Williams	Star Wars Episode III: Revenge of the Sith – Original Motion Picture Soundtrack	Classical	Sony Classical	
May 3	Keith Anderson	Three Chord Country and American Rock & Roll	Country	Arista Nashville	
May 3	Mike Doughty	Haughty Melodic	Rock	ATO	
May 3	Nine Inch Nails	With Teeth	Industrial rock, alternative rock, electronic rock	Nothing, Interscope	
May 3	Nivea	Complicated	R&B	Jive	
May 3	Oneida	The Wedding	Krautrock, electronic, noise rock	Jagjaguwar, Three Gut, Rough Trade	
May 3	The Ponys	Celebration Castle	Indie rock, garage rock	In the Red	
May 3	Quasimoto	The Further Adventures of Lord Quas	Hip-hop	Stones Throw	
May 3	The Raveonettes	Pretty in Black	Indie rock	Columbia	
May 3	The Russian Futurists	Our Thickness	Synth-pop	Upper Class	
May 3	Ryan Adams and the Cardinals	Cold Roses	Alternative country, country rock	Lost Highway	
May 9	Mount Eerie	"No Flashlight": Songs of the Fulfilled Night	Indie rock, lo-fi	P.W. Elverum & Sun, Ltd., Play/Rec	
May 9	Teenage Fanclub	Man-Made	Alternative rock	Merge	
May 9	The Unseen	State of Discontent	Punk rock	Hellcat	
May 9	Why?	Sanddollars	Indie rock	Anticon	
May 10	Billy Bang	Vietnam: Reflections	Jazz	Justin Time	
May 10	Dave Matthews Band	Stand Up	Alternative rock, folk rock	RCA	
May 10	Dierks Bentley	Modern Day Drifter	Country	Capitol Nashville	
May 10	FannyPack	See You Next Tuesday	Hip-hop	Tommy Boy	
May 10	GZR	Ohmwork	Nu metal, groove metal	Sanctuary	
May 10	John Cena & Tha Trademarc	You Can't See Me	Hip-hop	WWE, Columbia	
May 10	Kate Earl	Fate Is the Hunter		Record Collection, Warner Bros.	
May 10	Kevin Devine	Split the Country, Split the Street	Indie rock, alternative rock	Triple Crown, Defiance	
May 10	Lucinda Williams	Live @ The Fillmore	Americana, alternative country, country rock	Lost Highway	
May 10	Pray for the Soul of Betty	Pray for the Soul of Betty	Hard rock	Koch	
May 10	Prince Paul	Itstrumental	Hip-hop	Female Fun Records	
May 10	Robert Earl Keen	What I Really Mean	Folk	Koch	
May 10	Spoon	Gimme Fiction	Indie rock, art rock, indie pop	Merge, Matador	
May 10	The Starting Line	Based on a True Story	Emo, pop-punk	Drive-Thru, Geffen	
May 10	Styx	Big Bang Theory	Rock	New Door	
May 10	Van Zant	Get Right with the Man	Country	Columbia	
May 10	Weezer	Make Believe	Alternative rock, power pop, pop-punk	Geffen	
May 11	Gorillaz	Demon Days	Alternative rock, hip-hop, trip hop	Parlophone, Virgin	
May 16	Ellen Allien	Thrills	Techno	BPitch Control	
May 16	Maxïmo Park	A Certain Trigger	Indie rock, post-punk revival, new wave	Warp	
May 16	Meshuggah	Catch Thirtythree	Avant-garde metal, progressive metal, groove metal	Nuclear Blast	
May 16	Tracy Bonham	Blink the Brightest	Rock, post-grunge	Zoë, Rounder	
May 17	An Angle	We Can Breathe under Alcohol	Indie rock, folk rock	Drive-Thru	
May 17	Cowboy Troy	Loco Motive	Country rap	Warner Bros.	
May 17	C-Rayz Walz	Year of the Beast	Hip-hop	Definitive Jux	
May 17	Kem	Album II		Motown	
May 17	Memphis Bleek	534	Hip-hop	Roc-A-Fella, Def Jam	
May 17	Nobody	And Everything Else...	Hip-hop	Plug Research	
May 17	The Red Chord	Clients	Deathcore, technical death metal, grindcore	Metal Blade	
May 17	The Rocket Summer	Hello, Good Friend	Rock, power pop	Militia	
May 17	System of a Down	Mezmerize	Nu metal, alternative metal	Columbia, American	
May 17	Toby Keith	Honkytonk University	Country	DreamWorks	
May 17	Van Morrison	Magic Time	Celtic rock, blues, R&B	Geffen	
May 22	Pelican	The Fire in Our Throats Will Beckon the Thaw	Post-metal	Hydra Head	
May 23	Audioslave	Out of Exile	Hard rock, alternative metal, alternative rock	Epic, Interscope	
May 23	Bruce Dickinson	Tyranny of Souls	Heavy metal, progressive metal	Sanctuary, Victor	
May 23	The Coral	The Invisible Invasion	Psychedelia	Deltasonic	
May 23	Four Tet	Everything Ecstatic	Electronic, folktronica, krautrock	Domino	
May 23	Nile	Annihilation of the Wicked	Technical death metal	Relapse	
May 23	Stephen Malkmus	Face the Truth	Rock	Matador, Domino	
May 24	Alkaline Trio	Crimson	Punk rock, pop-punk	Vagrant	
May 24	Amber Pacific	The Possibility and the Promise	Emo, pop-punk	Hopeless	
May 24	Animal Collective featuring Vashti Bunyan	Prospect Hummer	Experimental, freak folk, psychedelic rock	FatCat	
May 24	Common	Be	Hip-hop, conscious hip-hop, hip-hop soul	GOOD Music, Geffen	
May 24	Gucci Mane	Trap House		Big Cat	
May 24	Joshua Redman	Momentum	Jazz	Nonesuch	
May 24	Maria Taylor	11:11	Folktronica	Saddle Creek	
May 24	Marques Houston	Naked		Ultimate, Universal	
May 24	Molly Hatchet	Warriors of the Rainbow Bridge	Southern rock	SPV	
May 24	Nikka Costa	Can'tneverdidnothin'		Virgin	
May 24	Pretty Ricky	Bluestars	R&B, hip-hop	Atlantic, Bluestar Entertainment	
May 24	Robert Cray	Twenty	Blues	Sanctuary	
May 24	Seether	Karma and Effect	Post-grunge, alternative metal, nu metal	Wind-up	
May 24	Shelby Lynne	Suit Yourself	Country	Capitol	
May 24	Sleater-Kinney	The Woods	Alternative rock, hard rock, noise pop	Sub Pop	
May 24	Various artists	Motown Remixed	Funk, soul	Motown, Universal	
May 24	The Wallflowers	Rebel, Sweetheart	Alternative rock, roots rock	Interscope	
May 25	Black Eyed Peas	Monkey Business	Hip-hop, pop	A&M, Interscope, will.i.am	
May 30	Art Brut	Bang Bang Rock & Roll	Indie rock, art punk, garage punk	Fierce Panda	
May 30	Oasis	Don't Believe the Truth	Alternative rock, indie rock	Big Brother	
May 31	The Dead 60s	The Dead 60s	Ska punk	Deltasonic, Epic	
May 31	M.E.D.	Push Comes to Shove	Hip-hop	Stones Throw	
May 31	Paul Anka	Rock Swings	Swing	Verve	
May 31	Sean Price	Monkey Barz	Hip-hop	Duck Down Music	
May 31	Sentenced	The Funeral Album	Gothic metal, alternative metal, heavy metal	Century Media	
May 31	Smog	A River Ain't Too Much to Love	Indie folk, alternative country, lo-fi	Drag City, Domino	
May 31	Tosca	J.A.C.		!K7	
May 31	Vivian Green	Vivian	R&B	Columbia	

=== June ===
List of albums released in June 2005
Go to: January | February | March | April | May | June | July | August | September | October | November | December | Back to top
Release date	Artist	Album	Genre	Label	Ref.
June 3	Shakira	Fijación Oral, Vol. 1	Latin pop	Epic	
June 6	Avenged Sevenfold	City of Evil	Heavy metal, progressive metal, power metal	Warner Bros., Hopeless	
June 6	Coldplay	X&Y	Alternative rock, space rock	Parlophone, Capitol	
June 6	Geri Halliwell	Passion	Pop, jazz, dance-pop	Innocent, EMI	
June 6	Gotthard	Lipservice	Hard rock, rock	Nuclear Blast	
June 6	The Hellacopters	Rock & Roll Is Dead	Garage rock, punk rock, garage punk	Liquor and Poker Music, Sacred Heart Recordings	
June 6	Isolée	We Are Monster	Microhouse	Playhouse	
June 6	Marion Raven	Here I Am	Pop rock, hard rock	Atlantic Records	
June 6	MxPx	Panic	Pop-punk, punk rock	SideOneDummy	
June 6	Odd Nosdam	Burner	Hip-hop	Anticon	
June 6	The Tears	Here Come the Tears	Pop	Independiente	
June 6	Ulver	Blood Inside	Post-industrial, experimental rock, electronic rock	Jester	
June 7	The Aquabats	Charge!!	Rock, new wave, synth-pop	Nitro	
June 7	Death by Stereo	Death for Life	Heavy metal, hardcore punk	Epitaph	
June 7	Dream Theater	Octavarium	Progressive rock, progressive metal	Atlantic	
June 7	Finch	Say Hello to Sunshine	Post-hardcore	Drive-Thru, Geffen	
June 7	John Scofield	That's What I Say: John Scofield Plays the Music of Ray Charles	Jazz	Verve	
June 7	Kelly Osbourne	Sleeping in the Nothing	New wave, synth-pop, dance-rock	Sanctuary	
June 7	Motion City Soundtrack	Commit This to Memory	Emo, pop-punk	Epitaph	
June 7	Novillero	Aim Right for the Holes in Their Lives	Indie rock, pop	Mint	
June 7	The Number Twelve Looks Like You	Nuclear. Sad. Nuclear.	Mathcore, post-hardcore, metalcore	Eyeball	
June 7	Ringo Starr	Choose Love	Rock	Koch, CNR	
June 7	Ry Cooder	Chávez Ravine	Chicano rock, Tex-Mex, Latin jazz	Nonesuch	
June 7	Terence Blanchard	Flow	Jazz, post-bop	Blue Note	
June 7	The White Stripes	Get Behind Me Satan	Garage rock, alternative rock, blues rock	V2, XL	
June 13	Alanis Morissette	Jagged Little Pill Acoustic	Acoustic rock	Maverick, Warner Bros.	
June 13	Brian Eno	Another Day on Earth	Ambient	Hannibal	
June 13	The Departure	Dirty Words	Indie rock	Parlophone	
June 13	Funeral for a Friend	Hours	Post-hardcore, emo	Atlantic	
June 13	Jamie Lidell	Multiply	Electronic, soul, funk	Warp	
June 13	The Magic Numbers	The Magic Numbers	Indie pop	Heavenly, EMI	
June 13	Nine Black Alps	Everything Is	Alternative rock, post-grunge, grunge	Island	
June 13	Saint Etienne	Tales from Turnpike House	Alternative dance, dream pop, synth-pop	Sanctuary	
June 13	UB40	Who You Fighting For?	Reggae	DEP	
June 14	54-40	Yes to Everything	Alternative rock	True North	
June 14	As I Lay Dying	Shadows Are Security	Melodic metalcore	Metal Blade	
June 14	Backstreet Boys	Never Gone	Pop	Jive	
June 14	Bear vs. Shark	Terrorhawk	Post-hardcore, emo, indie rock	Equal Vision	
June 14	Dwight Yoakam	Blame the Vain	Country	New West	
June 14	Eric Johnson	Bloom	Rock, instrumental rock	Favored Nations	
June 14	Fat Joe	All or Nothing	Hip-hop	Terror Squad, Atlantic	
June 14	Foo Fighters	In Your Honor	Alternative rock, post-grunge, hard rock	RCA	
June 14	Life of Agony	Broken Valley	Alternative metal, grunge, hard rock	Epic	
June 14	Pernice Brothers	Discover a Lovelier You	Indie rock	Ashmont Records	
June 14	Static-X	Start a War	Industrial metal, nu metal, alternative metal	Warner Bros.	
June 15	Jamiroquai	Dynamite	Nu-funk, acid jazz, post-disco	Epic	
June 20	The Cribs	The New Fellas	Indie rock, post-punk revival, garage rock	Wichita	
June 21	As Cities Burn	Son, I Loved You at Your Darkest	Post-hardcore, screamo	Solid State	
June 21	Billy Corgan	TheFutureEmbrace	Alternative rock, shoegaze, electronic rock	Reprise	
June 21	Boyz n da Hood	Boyz n da Hood	Southern hip-hop, gangsta rap	Bad Boy South, Block, Atlantic	
June 21	Buckshot & 9th Wonder	Chemistry	Hip-hop	Duck Down Music	
June 21	Canibus	Mind Control	Hip-hop	Gladiator Music, Tommy Boy	
June 21	Clutch	Robot Hive/Exodus	Stoner rock, hard rock, blues rock	DRT	
June 21	Dredg	Catch Without Arms	Alternative rock, post-rock, progressive rock	Interscope	
June 21	Dropkick Murphys	The Warrior's Code	Celtic punk	Hellcat	
June 21	Eric Benét	Hurricane		Friday Records, Reprise	
June 21	John Hiatt	Master of Disaster	Heartland rock, roots rock, Americana	New West	
June 21	Keyshia Cole	The Way It Is	R&B	A&M, Interscope	
June 21	Laura Cantrell	Humming by the Flowered Vine	Country	Matador	
June 21	Master P	Ghetto Bill	Southern hip-hop, gangsta rap	The New No Limit, Koch	
June 21	The Redwalls	De Nova	Rock	Capitol	
June 21	Télépopmusik	Angel Milk	Electronic, trip hop, downtempo	Capitol	
June 21	Transplants	Haunted Cities	Rap rock, punk rock, alternative hip-hop	LaSalle, Atlantic	
June 21	Various artists	Look at All the Love We Found	Punk rock, ska, reggae	Cornerstone RAS	
June 22	Röyksopp	The Understanding	Electronica, Europop, electropop	Wall of Sound	
June 25	A	Teen Dance Ordinance	Alternative rock, pop-punk, hard rock	London, Hollywood	
June 27	Darkane	Layers of Lies	Melodic death metal, thrash metal	Nuclear Blast	
June 27	Melanie Brown	L.A. State of Mind	Pop	Amber Café	
June 28	Bif Naked	Superbeautifulmonster	Indie rock	Her Royal Majesty's, Warner	
June 28	Bizarre	Hannicap Circus	Hip-hop	Sanctuary Urban	
June 28	Cassidy	I'm a Hustla	East Coast hip-hop	J, Full Surface	
June 28	CKY	An Answer Can Be Found	Alternative metal, alternative rock, stoner rock	Island	
June 28	Clap Your Hands Say Yeah	Clap Your Hands Say Yeah	Indie rock	Wichita	
June 28	Darkest Hour	Undoing Ruin	Melodic death metal, metalcore	Victory	
June 28	Deerhoof	Green Cosmos	Indie rock	ATP	
June 28	DevilDriver	The Fury of Our Maker's Hand	Groove metal, melodic death metal	Roadrunner	
June 28	Esthero	Wikked Lil' Grrrls	Electronica, hip-hop, R&B	Reprise	
June 28	George Strait	Somewhere Down in Texas	Neotraditional country	MCA Nashville	
June 28	Haste the Day	When Everything Falls	Metalcore, Christian death metal	Solid State	
June 28	Hate Eternal	I, Monarch	Death metal	Earache	
June 28	Lesley Gore	Ever Since	Pop	Engine Company	
June 28	Longwave	There's a Fire	Indie rock, shoegaze	RCA	
June 28	The Posies	Every Kind of Light	Rock	Rykodisc	
June 28	PSC	25 to Life	Southern hip-hop, gangsta rap, trap	Grand Hustle, Atlantic	
June 28	Scary Kids Scaring Kids	The City Sleeps in Flames	Post-hardcore, emo, screamo	Immortal	
June 28	The String Cheese Incident	One Step Closer		SCI Fidelity	
June 28	Twiztid	Man's Myth (Vol. 1)	Horrorcore	Psychopathic	
June 28	Ying Yang Twins	U.S.A. (United State of Atlanta)	Hip-hop, Southern hip-hop, crunk	TVT	

== Third quarter ==
=== July ===
List of albums released in July 2005
Go to: January | February | March | April | May | June | July | August | September | October | November | December | Back to top
Release date	Artist	Album	Genre	Label	Ref.
July 4	Alice Cooper	Dirty Diamonds	Rock, hard rock, heavy metal	New West, Spitfire	
July 4	Armand van Helden	Nympho	House, electronica, nu-disco	Southern Fried	
July 4	Brakes	Give Blood	Indie rock	Rough Trade	
July 4	Hard-Fi	Stars of CCTV	Indie rock, post-punk revival	Necessary, Atlantic	
July 4	Missy Elliott	The Cookbook	Hip-hop, R&B	Goldmind, Atlantic	
July 4	The Subways	Young for Eternity	Garage rock	Infectious Music	
July 5	R. Kelly	TP.3 Reloaded		Jive	
July 5	Sufjan Stevens	Illinois	Indie folk, chamber folk, indie rock	Asthmatic Kitty, Secretly Canadian, Rough Trade	
July 11	Charlotte Church	Tissues and Issues	Dance-pop, pop rock, R&B	Daylight, Epic, Sony BMG	
July 11	Prefuse 73 and the Books	Prefuse 73 Reads the Books E.P.	Electronica	Warp	
July 11	Tony Iommi with Glenn Hughes	Fused	Heavy metal	Sanctuary	
July 12	Adrian Belew	Side Two	Rock, experimental rock, avant-garde	Sanctuary	
July 12	The All-American Rejects	Move Along	Pop-punk, power pop, alternative rock	Interscope, Doghouse	
July 12	The Black Dahlia Murder	Miasma	Melodic death metal	Metal Blade	
July 12	Bow Wow	Wanted	Hip-hop	Columbia, Sony Urban	
July 12	Brandi Carlile	Brandi Carlile	Folk rock	Columbia	
July 12	Bronson Arroyo	Covering the Bases	Grunge, alternative rock	Asylum	
July 12	Carole King	The Living Room Tour	R&B, pop	Rockingale, Hear Music	
July 12	Cool Calm Pete	Lost	Hip-hop	Embedded Records, Definitive Jux	
July 12	Daniel Lanois	Belladonna	Ambient, experimental	Anti-	
July 12	Felt	Felt 2: A Tribute to Lisa Bonet	Hip-hop	Rhymesayers	
July 12	Just Surrender	If These Streets Could Talk	Pop-punk, emo, post-hardcore	Broken English	
July 12	Slim Thug	Already Platinum	Hip-hop, Southern hip-hop	Boss Hogg Outlawz, Star Trak, Geffen	
July 12	Truckfighters	Gravity X	Stoner rock, desert rock	Fuzzorama Records, MeteorCity	
July 12	Various artists	Hustle & Flow: Music From and Inspired by the Motion Picture	Crunk, gangsta rap, hardcore hip-hop	Grand Hustle, Atlantic	
July 12	Xiu Xiu	La Forêt	Art rock, experimental, post-punk	5 Rue Christine	
July 14	Foetus	Love	Industrial	Ectopic Ents, Birdman	
July 15	Rehab	Graffiti the World	Southern hip-hop, alternative rock	Attica Sound	
July 18	Imogen Heap	Speak for Yourself	Electronic, alternative rock	Megaphonic, RCA Victor, White Rabbit	
July 19	Carly Simon	Moonlight Serenade	Pop standards	Columbia	
July 19	Frank Black	Honeycomb	Americana, alternative country, Southern soul	Back Porch, Cooking Vinyl	
July 19	J-Live	The Hear After	Hip-hop	Penalty	
July 19	Number One Gun	Promises for the Imperfect	Christian rock, alternative rock	Tooth & Nail	
July 19	Thalía	El Sexto Sentido	Latin pop, dance-pop	EMI Latin	
July 25	Björk	Drawing Restraint 9		One Little Indian	
July 25	Crazy Frog	Crazy Hits	Electronica, Eurodance	Universal	
July 25	Editors	The Back Room	Post-punk revival, gothic rock, indie pop	Kitchenware	
July 26	Ana Popović	Ana! Live in Amsterdam	Electric blues, blues rock	Ruf	
July 26	Arch Enemy	Doomsday Machine	Melodic death metal	Century Media	
July 26	Babyface	Grown & Sexy	Crunk, hip-hop	Arista	
July 26	Bob Mould	Body of Song	Alternative rock	Granary Music, Yep Roc	
July 26	Boys Night Out	Trainwreck	Emo, pop rock	Ferret	
July 26	Chiodos	All's Well That Ends Well	Post-hardcore, screamo	Equal Vision	
July 26	The Concretes	Layourbattleaxedown	Indie pop	Astralwerks	
July 26	Daniel Powter	Daniel Powter	Indie pop, pop rock	Warner Bros.	
July 26	Dope	American Apathy	Nu metal, industrial metal	Artemis	
July 26	Jason Aldean	Jason Aldean	Country	Broken Bow	
July 26	Jason Mraz	Mr. A–Z	Pop rock	Atlantic	
July 26	Nevermore	This Godless Endeavor	Progressive metal, thrash metal	Century Media	
July 26	Paramore	All We Know Is Falling	Pop-punk, emo, pop rock	Fueled by Ramen	
July 26	Trey Songz	I Gotta Make It	R&B, hip-hop soul	Atlantic	
July 26	Twiztid	Mutant (Vol. 2)	Horrorcore, hip-hop, rap rock	Psychopathic	
July 26	Yngwie Malmsteen	Unleash the Fury	Neoclassical metal, heavy metal	Spitfire	
July 26	Young Jeezy	Let's Get It: Thug Motivation 101	Hip-hop, Southern hip-hop, gangsta rap	Island Def Jam, Def Jam, Corporate Thugz	

=== August ===
List of albums released in August 2005
Go to: January | February | March | April | May | June | July | August | September | October | November | December | Back to top
Release date	Artist	Album	Genre	Label	Ref.
August 1	Hermitude	Tales of the Drift	Australian hip-hop	Elefant Traks	
August 1	Madball	Legacy			
August 2	Blindside	The Great Depression	Hardcore punk, alternative rock, hard rock	DRT, Wasa Recordings	
August 2	Emery	The Question	Post-hardcore, progressive rock	Tooth & Nail	
August 2	Faith Hill	Fireflies	Country	Warner Bros. Nashville	
August 2	Houston Calls	A Collection of Short Stories		Rushmore	
August 2	Michael Penn	Mr. Hollywood Jr., 1947	Rock	Mimeograph Records	
August 2	Teairra Marí	Roc-A-Fella Records Presents Teairra Marí		Roc-A-Fella	
August 2	Willie Nelson	Countryman	Reggae, country	Lost Highway	
August 8	Armin van Buuren	Shivers		Armada Music	
August 8	The Click Five	Greetings from Imrie House	Power pop, pop rock, pop-punk	Atlantic, Lava	
August 8	Hayley Westenra	Odyssey	Pop	Decca	
August 8	Matthew Herbert	Plat du Jour	Electronic	Accidental	
August 8	Nickel Creek	Why Should the Fire Die?	Progressive bluegrass	Sugar Hill	
August 9	Chimaira	Chimaira	Groove metal	Roadrunner	
August 9	Doomriders	Black Thunder	Stoner metal	Deathwish	
August 9	Earl Klugh	Naked Guitar		Koch	
August 9	Gogol Bordello	Gypsy Punks: Underdog World Strike	Folk punk, worldbeat, gypsy punk	SideOneDummy	
August 9	Hootie & the Blowfish	Looking for Lucky	Soft rock	Sneaky Long, Vanguard	
August 9	The Juan MacLean	Less Than Human	Electronic, dance-punk	DFA, EMI	
August 9	Juliana Hatfield	Made in China	Alternative rock	Ye Olde Records	
August 9	Pennywise	The Fuse	Punk rock, skate punk, melodic hardcore	Epitaph	
August 9	Proof	Searching for Jerry Garcia	Hip-hop, hardcore hip-hop	Iron Fist Records	
August 9	Richard Thompson	Front Parlour Ballads	Contemporary folk	Cooking Vinyl	
August 9	Staind	Chapter V	Post-grunge, alternative metal, nu metal	Flip, Atlantic	
August 9	Stephen Stills	Man Alive!	Rock	Titan/Pyramid Records	
August 9	The Suicide Machines	War Profiteering Is Killing Us All	Punk rock, ska punk, hardcore punk	SideOneDummy	
August 9	Tom Zé	Estudando o Pagode	MPB, avant-pop	Trama Records, Luaka Bop	
August 9	Tommy Lee	Tommyland: The Ride	Hard rock, alternative rock, post-grunge	TL Education Services Inc.	
August 9	Various artists	Killer Queen: A Tribute to Queen	Rock, hard rock	Hollywood	
August 15	The Rakes	Capture/Release	Post-punk revival	V2	
August 15	Supergrass	Road to Rouen	Alternative rock, art rock, psychedelic	Parlophone	
August 16	311	Don't Tread on Me		Volcano Entertainment	
August 16	Aly & AJ	Into the Rush	Pop rock, alternative rock	Hollywood	
August 16	Brad Paisley	Time Well Wasted	Country	Arista Nashville	
August 16	Cowboy Junkies	Early 21st Century Blues	Alternative country	Latent, Zoë, Cooking Vinyl	
August 16	The Fall of Troy	Doppelgänger	Emo, post-hardcore, progressive metal	Equal Vision	
August 16	Fun Lovin' Criminals	Livin' in the City		Sanctuary	
August 16	Madness	The Dangermen Sessions Vol. 1	Ska, reggae, 2 tone	Live and Intensified	
August 16	Pras Michel	Win Lose or Draw	Hip-hop, pop-rap, reggae fusion	Universal	
August 16	Silverstein	Discovering the Waterfront	Emo, post-hardcore	Victory	
August 16	Stryper	Reborn	Christian metal, nu metal	Big 3 Records	
August 16	Taproot	Blue-Sky Research	Post-grunge, alternative metal, nu metal	Atlantic, Velvet Hammer	
August 16	Todd Agnew	Reflection of Something	Christian rock, contemporary Christian music	Ardent, SRE, Epic	
August 16	The Trews	Den of Thieves	Hard rock, alternative rock	Epic, RED Distribution	
August 16	A Wilhelm Scream	Ruiner	Melodic hardcore, punk rock, math rock	Nitro	
August 17	Goldfrapp	Supernature	Electroclash, synth-pop, glam rock	Mute	
August 22	Alias and Ehren	Lillian	Instrumental hip-hop, electronica, jazz	Anticon	
August 22	Baxter Dury	Floor Show	Psychedelic	Rough Trade	
August 22	Black Rebel Motorcycle Club	Howl	Folk rock, blues rock, Americana	RCA, Echo	
August 22	Fear Factory	Transgression	Industrial metal, groove metal, alternative metal	Calvin Records	
August 22	Super Furry Animals	Love Kraft	Indie rock	Epic	
August 23	Bayside	Bayside	Emo, pop-punk, post-hardcore	Victory	
August 23	Beautiful Creatures	Deuce	Hard rock	Spitfire	
August 23	The Bled	Found in the Flood	Hardcore punk, mathcore, metalcore	Vagrant	
August 23	Boris with Merzbow	Sun Baked Snow Cave	Drone metal, dark ambient, noise	Hydra Head, Double H Noise Industries	
August 23	The Brian Jonestown Massacre	We Are the Radio	Rock	Tee Pee	
August 23	Every Time I Die	Gutter Phenomenon	Metalcore, Southern rock, hardcore punk	Ferret	
August 23	Hush	Bulletproof	Hip-hop, rap rock	Geffen	
August 23	I Wayne	Lava Ground	Reggae	VP	
August 23	Jack's Mannequin	Everything in Transit	Pop rock, power pop	Maverick	
August 23	Jim Jones	Harlem: Diary of a Summer	East Coast hip-hop	Diplomat, Koch	
August 23	June	If You Speak Any Faster	Pop-punk, emo	Victory	
August 23	Khanate	Capture & Release	Drone doom	Hydra Head	
August 23	Laura Veirs	Year of Meteors	Folk	Nonesuch	
August 23	Leo Kottke and Mike Gordon	Sixty Six Steps	Folk, Americana, new acoustic	RCA Victor	
August 23	Minus the Bear	Menos el Oso	Indie rock, math rock, experimental rock	Suicide Squeeze	
August 23	The New Pornographers	Twin Cinema	Indie rock, power pop, pop rock	Mint, Matador, P-Vine	
August 23	Orenda Fink	Invisible Ones	Indie rock, indie pop	Saddle Creek	
August 23	Scarling.	So Long, Scarecrow	Noise pop, gothic rock, shoegaze	Sympathy for the Record Industry	
August 23	Trick Pony	R.I.D.E.	Country	Asylum-Curb	
August 23	The Warlocks	Surgery	Psychedelic rock	Mute	
August 24	Junior Senior	Hey Hey My My Yo Yo		Crunchy Frog	
August 24	Swallow the Sun	Ghosts of Loss	Death-doom, melodic death metal, gothic metal	Firebox	
August 29	Bloc Party	Silent Alarm Remixed	Dance-punk, indie rock	Wichita	
August 29	Eric Clapton	Back Home	Blues rock, reggae, folk rock	Reprise	
August 29	Iron Maiden	Death on the Road	Heavy metal	EMI	
August 29	McFly	Wonderland	Pop rock, baroque pop	Island	
August 29	Opeth	Ghost Reveries	Progressive metal, progressive death metal	Roadrunner	
August 29	Rihanna	Music of the Sun	Dance-pop, dancehall, R&B	Def Jam	
August 29	Serena-Maneesh	Serena Maneesh	Shoegaze, indie rock, noise pop	HoneyMilk Records	
August 30	Audio Adrenaline	Until My Heart Caves In	Christian rock	ForeFront	
August 30	Becoming the Archetype	Terminate Damnation	Progressive death metal, metalcore	Solid State	
August 30	Biohazard	Means to an End	Hardcore punk, rapcore	SPV/Steamhammer	
August 30	Brooks & Dunn	Hillbilly Deluxe	Neotraditional country	Arista Nashville	
August 30	Casting Crowns	Lifesong	Christian rock, pop rock	Beach Street, Reunion	
August 30	The Clientele	Strange Geometry	Indie rock	Merge, Pointy	
August 30	Cold	A Different Kind of Pain	Post-grunge, alternative rock, alternative metal	Flip, Atlantic, Lava	
August 30	Death Cab for Cutie	Plans	Indie pop, indie rock, alternative rock	Atlantic, Barsuk	
August 30	From Autumn to Ashes	Abandon Your Friends	Screamo, metalcore, emo	Vagrant	
August 30	Heather Nova	Redbird	Indie rock		
August 30	Kanye West	Late Registration	Hip-hop, pop rap, progressive rap	Def Jam, Roc-A-Fella	
August 30	OK Go	Oh No	Alternative rock, power pop	Capitol	
August 30	Our Lady Peace	Healthy in Paranoid Times	Alternative rock, post-grunge	Columbia	
August 30	Protest the Hero	Kezia	Progressive metal, mathcore, skate punk	Underground Operations, Vagrant	
August 30	Thirty Seconds to Mars	A Beautiful Lie	Alternative rock, hard rock, post-hardcore	Immortal, Virgin	
August 30	Vendetta Red	Sisters of the Red Death	Emo, post-hardcore, screamo	Epic	

=== September ===
List of albums released in September 2005
Go to: January | February | March | April | May | June | July | August | September | October | November | December | Back to top
Release date	Artist	Album	Genre	Label	Ref.
September 1	Jonathan Coulton	Our Bodies, Ourselves, Our Cybernetic Arms			
September 2	Alain Souchon	La Vie Théodore	Pop		
September 2	Shaggy	Clothes Drop		Geffen	
September 5	Richard Hawley	Coles Corner	Chamber pop, soft rock	Mute	
September 5	Stratovarius	Stratovarius	Heavy metal, progressive metal, hard rock	Sanctuary	
September 6	Against Me!	Searching for a Former Clarity	Punk rock, folk punk	Fat Wreck Chords	
September 6	AZ	A.W.O.L.	East Coast hip-hop	Fast Life, Quiet Money, Koch	
September 6	Between the Buried and Me	Alaska	Progressive metal, technical death metal, progressive metalcore	Victory	
September 6	Blood on the Wall	Awesomer	Indie rock	Social Registry	
September 6	George Clinton & the P-Funk All-Stars	How Late Do U Have 2BB4UR Absent?	Funk, dance, hip-hop	The C Kunspyruhzy	
September 6	Heaven 17	Before After	Synth-pop	Ninthwave	
September 6	Ion Dissonance	Solace	Mathcore, deathcore, grindcore	Abacus	
September 6	James McMurtry	Childish Things	Country, Americana	Compadre	
September 6	North Mississippi Allstars	Electric Blue Watermelon	Southern rock	ATO	
September 6	The Proclaimers	Restless Soul	Alternative rock, folk rock, rhythm and blues	Persevere Records	
September 6	The Rolling Stones	A Bigger Bang	Rock	Virgin	
September 6	Ron Sexsmith & Don Kerr	Destination Unknown		V2	
September 6	Socratic	Lunch for the Sky		Drive-Thru	
September 9	The Guggenheim Grotto	...Waltzing Alone	Folk, alternative rock	Rykodisc	
September 12	Apoptygma Berzerk	You and Me Against the World	Futurepop, alternative rock, electronic rock	Metropolis	
September 12	Damian Marley	Welcome to Jamrock	Reggae, dancehall, ska	Universal	
September 12	David Gray	Life in Slow Motion	Folk rock	Atlantic, ATO	
September 12	dEUS	Pocket Revolution	Indie rock	Universal, V2	
September 12	Elbow	Leaders of the Free World	Alternative rock, art rock	V2	
September 12	Parkway Drive	Killing with a Smile	Metalcore	Resist Records, Epitaph	
September 12	Paul McCartney	Chaos and Creation in the Backyard	Rock	Parlophone, Capitol	
September 12	Rob Dickinson	Fresh Wine for the Horses	Alternative rock	Sanctuary	
September 12	Sigur Rós	Takk...	Post-rock	Geffen, EMI	
September 12	Simple Minds	Black & White 050505	Pop rock	Sanctuary	
September 12	TVXQ	Rising Sun	K-pop	SM	
September 13	Ali Farka Touré and Toumani Diabaté	In the Heart of the Moon	African blues	World Circuit	
September 13	Apollo Sunshine	Apollo Sunshine	Indie rock	SpinART	
September 13	Blues Traveler	¡Bastardos!	Rock	Vanugard	
September 13	Bonnie Raitt	Souls Alike	Rock	Capitol	
September 13	CocoRosie	Noah's Ark	Freak folk	Touch and Go	
September 13	The Dandy Warhols	Odditorium or Warlords of Mars	Neo-psychedelia	Capitol	
September 13	Devendra Banhart	Cripple Crow	Indie folk, Latin, psychedelia	XL	
September 13	The Fray	How to Save a Life	Alternative rock, pop rock	Epic	
September 13	Giant Drag	Hearts and Unicorns	Indie rock, alternative rock	Kickball Records	
September 13	Harvey Danger	Little by Little...	Indie rock, alternative rock, power pop	Phonographic Records	
September 13	Institute	Distort Yourself	Hard rock	Interscope	
September 13	The Juliana Theory	Deadbeat Sweetheartbeat	Emo, alternative rock, indie rock	Abacus, Paper Fist	
September 13	KMFDM	Hau Ruck	Industrial rock, industrial metal	Metropolis	
September 13	Lene Lovich	Shadows and Dust	New wave	The Stereo Society	
September 13	The Like	Are You Thinking What I'm Thinking?	Indie rock	Geffen	
September 13	Little Brother	The Minstrel Show	Hip-hop, jazz rap	Atlantic	
September 13	Lonestar	Coming Home	Country	BNA	
September 13	Paul Wall	The Peoples Champ	Hip-hop, Southern hip-hop	Atlantic, Asylum, Swishahouse	
September 13	The Pussycat Dolls	PCD	Pop, dance-pop, R&B	A&M	
September 13	Queen + Paul Rodgers	Return of the Champions	Rock, hard rock	Parlophone, Hollywood	
September 13	Spin Doctors	Nice Talking to Me	Pop rock	Ruff Nation Records	
September 13	Stellastarr	Harmonies for the Haunted	Indie rock, post-punk revival	RCA	
September 13	Switchfoot	Nothing Is Sound	Alternative rock, post-grunge, hard rock	Columbia, Sony BMG	
September 13	Tracy Chapman	Where You Live		Elektra	
September 13	Trapt	Someone in Control	Nu metal, alternative metal, alternative rock	Warner Bros.	
September 13	Trisha Yearwood	Jasper County	Country	MCA Nashville	
September 14	Children of Bodom	Are You Dead Yet?	Melodic death metal, power metal	Spinefarm, Century Media	
September 19	Arcturus	Sideshow Symphonies	Avant-garde metal, progressive metal, symphonic black metal	Season of Mist	
September 19	Broadcast	Tender Buttons	Electronic pop, dream pop	Warp	
September 19	Disturbed	Ten Thousand Fists	Alternative metal, heavy metal, nu metal	Reprise	
September 19	Goldie Lookin Chain	Safe as Fuck		Warner Music	
September 19	Hypocrisy	Virus	Melodic death metal	Nuclear Blast	
September 19	Jackson and His Computerband	Smash		Warp	
September 19	Oceansize	Everyone into Position	Progressive rock	Beggars Banquet	
September 20	The 88	Over and Over	Indie rock, power pop	EMK, Mootron	
September 20	The American Analog Set	Set Free	Indie rock	Arts & Crafts, Morr Music	
September 20	the Audition	Controversy Loves Company	Pop-punk	Victory	
September 20	The Bad Plus	Suspicious Activity?	Jazz	Columbia	
September 20	Barbra Streisand	Guilty Pleasures	Pop, soul		
September 20	Bon Jovi	Have a Nice Day	Pop rock, hard rock	Island, Mercury	
September 20	Burning Spear	Our Music	Roots reggae	Burning Music	
September 20	Cage	Hell's Winter	Emo rap, hip-hop	Definitive Jux	
September 20	Coheed and Cambria	Good Apollo, I'm Burning Star IV, Volume One: From Fear Through the Eyes of Madness	Progressive rock, progressive metal, emo	Columbia	
September 20	David Banner	Certified	Hip-hop, hardcore hip-hop, dirty rap	SRC, Universal	
September 20	Earth, Wind & Fire	Illumination	R&B, funk, neo soul	Sanctuary	
September 20	Echo & the Bunnymen	Siberia	Alternative rock, post-punk, neo-psychedelia	Cooking Vinyl	
September 20	God Forbid	IV: Constitution of Treason	Metalcore, thrash metal	Century Media	
September 20	Maroon 5	Live – Friday the 13th		A&M Octone	
September 20	Motörhead	BBC Live & In-Session	Heavy metal	Sanctuary	
September 20	Municipal Waste	Hazardous Mutation	Crossover thrash	Earache	
September 20	Nada Surf	The Weight Is a Gift	Alternative rock	Barsuk	
September 20	Ryan Cabrera	You Stand Watching	Pop rock	Atlantic	
September 23	Pugwash	Jollity	Chamber pop, power pop	1969 Records, Karmic Hit	
September 26	Forever Slave	Alice's Inferno		Armageddon Music	
September 26	Hatesphere	The Sickness Within	Death metal, thrash metal	SPV GmbH	
September 26	HIM	Dark Light	Gothic rock, pop rock	Sire, Heartagram	
September 26	Jamie Cullum	Catching Tales	Vocal jazz, blue-eyed soul	UCJ, Candid, Verve Forecast	
September 26	Katie Melua	Piece by Piece	Jazz, pop, blues	Dramatico	
September 26	Roger Waters	Ça Ira	Classical, opera	Sony Classical	
September 26	Ryan Adams	Jacksonville City Nights	Country rock, alternative country	Lost Highway	
September 26	Tokyo Dragons	Give Me the Fear	Hard rock		
September 26	Why?	Elephant Eyelash	Indie rock	Anticon	
September 27	BarlowGirl	Another Journal Entry	Christian rock	Fervent	
September 27	Big Star	In Space	Power pop	Rykodisc	
September 27	Blackalicious	The Craft	Hip-hop	Anti-	
September 27	Bloodhound Gang	Hefty Fine	Rap rock, comedy rock, dance-rock	Geffen	
September 27	Buddy Guy	Bring 'Em In	Chicago blues, electric blues	Jive, Silvertone	
September 27	Constantines	Tournament of Hearts	Indie rock, alternative rock	Three Gut	
September 27	David Crowder Band	A Collision or (3+4=7)	Christian rock, worship	sixsteps	
September 27	Gojira	From Mars to Sirius	Technical death metal, progressive metal, groove metal	Listenable, Prosthetic	
September 27	Grandaddy	Excerpts from the Diary of Todd Zilla	Indie rock	V2	
September 27	Gretchen Wilson	All Jacked Up	Country, rock	Epic Nashville	
September 27	Hinder	Extreme Behavior	Hard rock, post-grunge	Universal	
September 27	King's X	Ogre Tones	Hard rock, progressive metal	Inside Out Music	
September 27	Lil' Kim	The Naked Truth	Hip-hop	Queen Bee, Atlantic	
September 27	Metric	Live It Out	Indie rock, new wave, post-punk revival	Last Gang	
September 27	Ministry	Rantology	Industrial metal	Sanctuary	
September 27	Neil Young	Prairie Wind	Country rock, folk rock, Americana	Reprise	
September 27	Panic! at the Disco	A Fever You Can't Sweat Out	Pop-punk, emo pop, emo	Decaydance, Fueled by Ramen	
September 27	Ric Ocasek	Nexterday	New wave	Sanctuary	
September 27	Sean Paul	The Trinity	Dancehall, reggae	VP, Atlantic	
September 27	Sheryl Crow	Wildflower	Pop rock, country rock	A&M	
September 27	Stevie Wonder	A Time to Love		Motown	
September 27	The Thelonious Monk Quartet with John Coltrane	Thelonious Monk Quartet with John Coltrane at Carnegie Hall	Jazz	Blue Note	
September 27	Three 6 Mafia	Most Known Unknown	Hardcore hip-hop, Southern hip-hop, crunk	Hypnotize Minds, Columbia, Sony Urban	
September 27	Toni Braxton	Libra	R&B, pop, hip-hop	Blackground	
September 27	Wolf Parade	Apologies to the Queen Mary	Indie rock	Sub Pop	
September 28	Franz Ferdinand	You Could Have It So Much Better	Indie rock, post-punk revival, dance-punk	Domino	
September 30	U.D.O.	Mission No. X	Heavy metal	AFM	

== Fourth quarter ==
=== October ===
List of albums released in October 2005
Go to: January | February | March | April | May | June | July | August | September | October | November | December | Back to top
Release date	Artist	Album	Genre	Label	Ref.
October 3	Andy Bell	Electric Blue	Pop	Sanctuary	
October 3	Bullet for My Valentine	The Poison	Metalcore	Visible Noise, Trustkill, Sony BMG	
October 3	The Fall	Fall Heads Roll	Alternative rock	Slogan, Narnack	
October 3	The Herd	The Sun Never Sets	Australian hip-hop	Elefant Traks	
October 3	Jo O'Meara	Relentless	Pop	Sanctuary	
October 3	Ladytron	Witching Hour	Synth-pop, electronic rock, post-punk	Island	
October 3	Ms. Dynamite	Judgement Days	R&B, hip-hop	Polydor	
October 3	Shakra	Fall			
October 4	Aiden	Nightmare Anatomy	Post-hardcore, screamo	Victory	
October 4	Anita Baker	Christmas Fantasy	Christmas, jazz, R&B	Blue Note	
October 4	Atmosphere	You Can't Imagine How Much Fun We're Having	Hip-hop	Rhymesayers	
October 4	Broken Social Scene	Broken Social Scene	Indie rock	Arts & Crafts	
October 4	Chris Cagle	Anywhere but Here	Country	Capitol Nashville	
October 4	Clint Black	Drinkin' Songs and Other Logic	Country	Equity	
October 4	Deathspell Omega	Kénôse	Black metal, avant-garde metal	Norma Evangelium Diaboli	
October 4	Exodus	Shovel Headed Kill Machine	Thrash metal	Nuclear Blast	
October 4	Fiona Apple	Extraordinary Machine	Art pop	Epic	
October 4	Flyleaf	Flyleaf	Alternative metal, nu metal, Christian rock	Octone, Polydor	
October 4	Journey	Generations	Rock, hard rock	Sanctuary, Frontiers, King	
October 4	Kiss Me Deadly	Misty Medley	Indie rock, post-rock, shoegaze	Alien8	
October 4	Little Big Town	The Road to Here	Country	Equity	
October 4	Living Things	Ahead of the Lions	Alternative rock, glam rock, garage rock	Jive	
October 4	Liz Phair	Somebody's Miracle	Pop rock, alternative rock	Capitol	
October 4	Look What I Did	Minuteman for the Moment	Progressive metal, math rock	Combat, Koch	
October 4	My Morning Jacket	Z	Alternative country, indie pop, indie rock	ATO	
October 4	Nickelback	All the Right Reasons	Post-grunge, alternative rock, hard rock	Roadrunner, EMI	
October 4	The Reverend Horton Heat	We Three Kings	Christmas, rock	Yep Roc	
October 4	Robert Glasper	Canvas	Jazz fusion, post-bop	Blue Note	
October 4	Sara Evans	Real Fine Place	Country	RCA Nashville	
October 4	Shinedown	Us and Them	Hard rock, alternative metal, post-grunge	Atlantic	
October 4	Sinéad O'Connor	Throw Down Your Arms	Reggae	Chocolate and Vanilla	
October 4	Soulfly	Dark Ages	Thrash metal, groove metal, death metal	Roadrunner	
October 4	Trina	Glamorest Life	Southern hip-hop, R&B	Slip-n-Slide, Atlantic	
October 4	Twista	The Day After		Atlantic	
October 5	Son Volt	Okemah and the Melody of Riot	Alternative country	Transmit Sounds	
October 5	t.A.T.u.	Dangerous and Moving	Pop rock, dance-pop, alternative rock	Interscope	
October 7	Alicia Keys	Unplugged	R&B	J	
October 7	Sound Directions	The Funky Side of Life	Jazz, funk	Stones Throw	
October 9	CSS	Cansei de Ser Sexy	Punk funk	Trama	
October 10	Akercocke	Words That Go Unspoken, Deeds That Go Undone	Blackened death metal, progressive metal	Earache	
October 10	Danger Doom	The Mouse and the Mask	Underground hip-hop	Epitaph, Lex	
October 10	Ricky Martin	Life	Crunk, hip-hop, pop	Columbia	
October 10	Robert Wyatt	Theatre Royal Drury Lane 8th September 1974	Progressive rock, jazz fusion	Hannibal	
October 10	Sugababes	Taller in More Ways	Pop, electropop, R&B	Island	
October 11	Adult	Gimmie Trouble		Thrill Jockey	
October 11	Allister	Before the Blackout	Pop-punk, punk rock, alternative rock	Drive-Thru	
October 11	Deerhoof	The Runners Four	Pop rock, art pop	Kill Rock Stars, ATP, 5 Rue Christine	
October 11	Default	One Thing Remains	Hard rock, post-grunge, alternative rock	TVT	
October 11	Dolly Parton	Those Were the Days	Country folk, bluegrass	Sugar Hill, Blue Eye Records	
October 11	Early Man	Closing In	Heavy metal, speed metal, thrash metal	Matador	
October 11	Gary Allan	Tough All Over	Country	MCA Nashville	
October 11	Jackson Browne	Solo Acoustic, Vol. 1	Folk rock, American folk	Inside	
October 11	The Long Winters	Ultimatum	Indie rock	Barsuk	
October 11	Matt Pond PA	Several Arrows Later	Indie rock		
October 11	Modeselektor	Hello Mom!	IDM	BPitch Control	
October 11	Mouse on Mars	Live 04	IDM	Sonig	
October 11	Paul Weller	As Is Now	Rock	Yep Roc	
October 11	Roadrunner United	The All-Star Sessions	Heavy metal	Roadrunner	
October 11	Sevendust	Next	Alternative metal, nu metal	Winedark	
October 11	Story of the Year	In the Wake of Determination	Post-hardcore, alternative rock, alternative metal	Maverick	
October 11	Susan Tedeschi	Hope and Desire	Blues	Verve Forecast	
October 11	Warren G	In the Mid-Nite Hour	Hip-hop	Hawino Records	
October 13	Anda Adam	Confidențial	Pop, hip-hop, R&B	Roton	
October 14	The Cardigans	Super Extra Gravity	Rock, country rock, pop rock	Stockholm	
October 14	Old Man's Child	Vermin	Symphonic black metal	Century Media	
October 15	Bomb the Music Industry!	To Leave or Die in Long Island	Ska punk	Quote Unquote, Asbestos	
October 15	Primal Fear	Seven Seals	Heavy metal, power metal	Nuclear Blast	
October 17	Arab Strap	The Last Romance	Alternative rock	Chemikal Underground	
October 17	Boards of Canada	The Campfire Headphase	Electronic, downtempo, folktronica	Warp, music70	
October 17	Depeche Mode	Playing the Angel	Electronic rock, synth-pop	Mute	
October 17	Rachel Stevens	Come and Get It	Pop	19, Polydor	
October 17	Simply Red	Simplified	Soul, rock	Simplyred.com, Universal	
October 17	Starsailor	On the Outside	Alternative rock, indie rock	EMI	
October 17	Sunn O)))	Black One	Ambient, avant-garde, black metal	Southern Lord	
October 17	Vashti Bunyan	Lookaftering	Folk, psychedelic folk	FatCat	
October 17	The Veronicas	The Secret Life of...	Pop rock, pop-punk	Sire, London	
October 18	Animal Collective	Feels	Indie rock	FatCat	
October 18	Ashlee Simpson	I Am Me	Pop rock, pop-punk, alternative rock	Geffen	
October 18	Billy Currington	Doin' Somethin' Right	Country	Mercury Nashville	
October 18	Black Rob	The Black Rob Report	East Coast hip-hop	Bad Boy, Atlantic	
October 18	Blockhead	Downtown Science	Instrumental hip-hop	Ninja Tune	
October 18	Brian Wilson	What I Really Want for Christmas	Christmas	Arista	
October 18	Bun B	Trill	Southern hip-hop	Rap-A-Lot, Asylum, Atlantic	
October 18	Burnside Project	The Finest Example Is You		Bar/None	
October 18	Cryptopsy	Once Was Not	Technical death metal	Century Media	
October 18	Fireball Ministry	Their Rock Is Not Our Rock	Stoner metal, biker metal	Liquor and Poker	
October 18	Lightning Bolt	Hypermagic Mountain	Noise rock	Load	
October 18	Martina McBride	Timeless	Country	RCA	
October 18	Mest	Photographs	Pop-punk, alternative rock	Maverick	
October 18	Priestess	Hello Master	Hard rock, stoner rock	Indica Records, RCA	
October 18	Propagandhi	Potemkin City Limits		G7 Welcoming Committee, Fat Wreck Chords	
October 18	Rev. Run	Distortion	Hip-hop, rap rock	Russell Simmons Music Group, Island Def Jam	
October 18	Rod Stewart	Thanks for the Memory: The Great American Songbook, Volume IV	Traditional pop, jazz	J	
October 18	Silver Jews	Tanglewood Numbers	Indie rock	Drag City	
October 18	Thrice	Vheissu	Post-hardcore, experimental	Island	
October 21	Miho Hatori	Ecdysis	Avant-garde, indie rock, world music	Speedstar International, Rykodisc	
October 23	Earth	Hex; Or Printing in the Infernal Method	Post-metal	Southern Lord	
October 24	Dark Funeral	Attera Totus Sanctus	Black metal	Regain, Candlelight	
October 24	Deep Purple	Rapture of the Deep	Hard rock, progressive rock	Edel Music	
October 24	The Fiery Furnaces	Rehearsing My Choir	Indie rock, spoken word	Rough Trade	
October 24	Robbie Williams	Intensive Care	Pop rock	Chrysalis, EMI	
October 24	Stream of Passion	Embrace the Storm	Progressive metal	Inside Out Music	
October 25	Aberdeen City	The Freezing Atlantic	Indie rock, alternative rock	Dovecote	
October 25	Aerosmith	Rockin' the Joint	Hard rock, blues rock	Columbia	
October 25	Buckethead & Friends	Enter the Chicken	Avant-garde metal, experimental rock, alternative metal	Serjical Strike	
October 25	Chris Brokaw	Incredible Love	Alternative rock	12XU, Rock Action, Acuarela Discos	
October 25	Craig Wedren	Lapland	Alternative rock	Team Love	
October 25	Demon Hunter	The Triptych	Metalcore, groove metal, Christian metal	Solid State	
October 25	DJ Muggs vs. GZA	Grandmasters	Hip-hop	Angeles Records	
October 25	Joe Nichols	III	Country	Universal South	
October 25	Sadat X	Experience & Education	Hip-hop	Female Fun Music	
October 25	Slum Village	Slum Village	Hip-hop	Barak Records	
October 25	Through the Eyes of the Dead	Bloodlust	Deathcore, melodic death metal	Prosthetic	
October 25	Valencia	This Could Be a Possibility	Pop-punk	I Surrender	
October 25	Various artists	This Bird Has Flown – A 40th Anniversary Tribute to the Beatles' Rubber Soul		Razor & Tie	
October 26	Diana Krall	Christmas Songs	Jazz, Christmas	Verve	
October 28	Maritime	We, the Vehicles	Indie pop	Flameshovel	
October 28	Tapes 'n Tapes	The Loon	Indie rock	Ibid Records, XL	
October 28	Xavier Rudd	Food in the Belly	Folk, blues, indie folk	Salt X, Universal Music Australia	
October 31	Audio Bullys	Generation	Big beat, EDM	Source Records, Astralwerks	
October 31	Helloween	Keeper of the Seven Keys: The Legacy	Progressive metal	Steamhammer	
October 31	Santana	All That I Am	Latin rock	Arista	
October 31	Westlife	Face to Face	Pop	S, RCA, Sony BMG	
October 31	Wolfmother	Wolfmother	Hard rock, stoner rock, heavy metal	Modular	

=== November ===
List of albums released in November 2005
Go to: January | February | March | April | May | June | July | August | September | October | November | December | Back to top
Release date	Artist	Album	Genre	Label	Ref.
November 1	Burt Bacharach	At This Time	Pop, rock	Columbia	
November 1	Canibus	Hip-Hop for Sale	Hip-hop	Babygrande	
November 1	Holy Fuck	Holy Fuck	Electronica	Dependent Music	
November 1	Lagwagon	Resolve	Pop-punk, skate punk	Fat Wreck Chords	
November 1	O.C.	Smoke and Mirrors	Hip-hop	Hieroglyphics Imperium	
November 1	Ozzy Osbourne	Under Cover	Rock	Epic	
November 1	Public Enemy	New Whirl Odor	Political hip-hop, East Coast hip-hop, hardcore hip-hop	Slam Jamz	
November 1	Slipknot	9.0: Live	Nu metal	Roadrunner	
November 1	Sun Kil Moon	Tiny Cities	Folk rock	Caldo Verde	
November 1	Terri Clark	Life Goes On	Country	Mercury Nashville	
November 1	Third Day	Wherever You Are	Southern rock, Christian rock	Essential	
November 1	Trey Anastasio	Shine	Alternative rock, power pop, neo-psychedelia	Columbia	
November 4	A-ha	Analogue		Polydor	
November 6	Johnny Hallyday	Ma vérité	Rock	Mercury, Universal Music	
November 7	Delirious?	The Mission Bell	Rock, Christian rock	Sparrow, Furious? Records	
November 7	Kate Bush	Aerial	Art rock, progressive pop	EMI, Columbia	
November 8	Annihilator	Schizo Deluxe	Thrash metal	AFM	
November 8	August Burns Red	Thrill Seeker	Metalcore	Solid State	
November 8	Cyndi Lauper	The Body Acoustic	Pop rock	Epic, Daylight	
November 8	Elfonía	This Sonic Landscape		The Note Garden Records	
November 8	Floetry	Flo'Ology		Geffen	
November 8	Kenny Chesney	The Road and the Radio	Country	BNA	
November 8	The Mars Volta	Scabdates	Progressive rock, experimental rock	Gold Standard Laboratories, Universal, Strummer	
November 8	Neil Diamond	12 Songs	Rock, country	American/Columbia	
November 8	The Orb	Okie Dokie It's The Orb on Kompakt	Electronic	Kompakt	
November 8	Relient K	Apathetic EP	Christian rock, pop-punk	Gotee, Capitol	
November 8	Sepultura	Live in São Paulo	Groove metal, thrash metal, death metal	Steamhammer	
November 8	Sheek Louch	After Taxes	Hip-hop	D-Block Records, Koch	
November 8	TNT	All the Way to the Sun	Hard rock	MTM	
November 8	Various artists	Get Rich or Die Tryin': Music from and Inspired by the Motion Picture	Hip-hop	Interscope, G-Unit	
November 9	Madonna	Confessions on a Dance Floor	Dance-pop, nu-disco, EDM	Warner Bros.	
November 10	Theatres des Vampires	Pleasure and Pain	Gothic metal	Dreamcell11, Aural Music	
November 11	Bolt Thrower	Those Once Loyal	Death metal, heavy metal	Metal Blade	
November 11	Roine Stolt	Wallstreet Voodoo	Progressive blues	Inside Out Music	
November 12	Tally Hall	Marvin's Marvelous Mechanical Museum	Alternative rock, indie rock, power pop	Quack! Media, Atlantic, Needlejuice	
November 14	Szymon Wydra & Carpe Diem	Bezczas		Universal Music Poland	
November 15	Big & Rich	Comin' to Your City	Country	Warner Bros. Nashville	
November 15	Carrie Underwood	Some Hearts	Country, country pop	Arista Nashville, 19	
November 15	Ginuwine	Back II da Basics	R&B	Epic	
November 15	Green Day	Bullet in a Bible	Punk rock	Reprise, Warner Reprise	
November 15	Kardinal Offishall	Fire and Glory	Canadian hip-hop	EMI, Virgin, Black Jays	
November 15	Lady Sovereign	Vertically Challenged	Hip-hop, grime, UK garage	Chocolate Industries	
November 15	Mike Ladd	Father Divine	Hip-hop	ROIR	
November 15	P.O.D.	The Warriors EP, Volume 2	Alternative metal	Atlantic	
November 15	Pitbull	Money Is Still a Major Issue	Hip-hop, ragga hip-hop, reggaeton	TVT	
November 15	Various artists	Walk the Line: Original Motion Picture Soundtrack	Rock and roll, rockabilly, country	Wind-up, Fox Music, Sony BMG	
November 15	Wilco	Kicking Television: Live in Chicago	Rock	Nonesuch	
November 17	Sean Watkins	Blinders On	Indie folk, acoustic	Sugar Hill	
November 18	Boris	Pink	Metal, noise rock	Diwphalanx	
November 21	Enya	Amarantine	New-age	Warner Bros., Reprise	
November 22	Black Lips	Let It Bloom	Garage rock, lo-fi	In the Red	
November 22	The Bouncing Souls	Live		Chunksaah	
November 22	Britney Spears	B in the Mix: The Remixes	Electronic, dance-pop, house	Jive	
November 22	Chamillionaire	The Sound of Revenge	Southern hip-hop, gangsta rap	Chamilitary, Universal	
November 22	Dr. John and the Lower 911	Sippiana Hericane	Jazz	Blue Note, Parlophone	
November 22	Fort Minor	The Rising Tied	Alternative hip-hop, rap rock	Machine Shop, Warner Bros.	
November 22	John Mayer Trio	Try!		Columbia	
November 22	Juelz Santana	What the Game's Been Missing!	Hip-hop	Diplomat, Def Jam	
November 22	Okkervil River	Black Sheep Boy Appendix	Indie rock	Jagjaguwar	
November 22	Purple Ribbon All-Stars	Got Purp? Vol. 2	Southern hip-hop	Purple Ribbon, Virgin	
November 22	Queens of the Stone Age	Over the Years and Through the Woods	Hard rock	Interscope	
November 22	Scott Stapp	The Great Divide	Post-grunge, hard rock, alternative metal	Wind-up	
November 22	Seu Jorge	The Life Aquatic Studio Sessions	MPB, folk	Hollywood	
November 22	System of a Down	Hypnotize	Heavy metal, nu metal, alternative metal	Columbia, American	
November 22	Talib Kweli	Right About Now: The Official Sucka Free Mix CD	Underground hip-hop, alternative hip-hop	Koch	
November 22	Various artists	Hurricane Relief: Come Together Now	Rock, pop, country	Universal	
November 23	Per Gessle	Son of a Plumber	Pop	Elevator Entertainment, Capitol	
November 26	+/-	Let's Build a Fire	Alternative rock, indie rock	Absolutely Kosher, White Wabbit Records, & Records	
November 28	Cadence Weapon	Breaking Kayfabe	Hip-hop	Upper Class	
November 28	The Darkness	One Way Ticket to Hell... and Back	Hard rock, glam rock	Atlantic	
November 28	Fields of the Nephilim	Mourning Sun	Gothic rock, gothic metal	SPV	
November 28	Sacrificium	Escaping the Stupor		Black Lotus	
November 28	Shakira	Oral Fixation, Vol. 2	Pop rock	Epic	
November 29	Chris Brown	Chris Brown	R&B	Jive, CBE	
November 29	Dave Matthews Band	Weekend on the Rocks	Rock	RCA	
November 29	INXS	Switch	Funk rock	Epic	
November 30	Lindsay Lohan	A Little More Personal (Raw)	Pop rock	Casablanca	

=== December ===
List of albums released in December 2005
Go to: January | February | March | April | May | June | July | August | September | October | November | December | Back to top
Release date	Artist	Album	Genre	Label	Ref.
December 5	Super Junior	Twins	K-pop, bubblegum pop, dance	SM, Avex Taiwan	
December 6	Job for a Cowboy	Doom	Deathcore	King of the Monsters, Metal Blade	
December 6	Korn	See You on the Other Side	Nu metal, alternative metal, industrial rock	EMI, Virgin	
December 6	Lil Wayne	Tha Carter II	Hip-hop, hardcore hip-hop, R&B	Cash Money, Young Money, Universal	
December 6	Sonic Youth with Tim Barnes	SYR6: Koncertas Stan Brakhage prisiminimui	Free improvisation, experimental	SYR	
December 6	T-Pain	Rappa Ternt Sanga	R&B, hip-hop	Konvict, Jive, Zomba	
December 6	The White Stripes	Walking with a Ghost		V2	
December 13	Anthony Hamilton	Ain't Nobody Worryin'	R&B, soul, neo soul	So So Def, Zomba	
December 13	Beck	Guerolito	Alternative rock	Geffen	
December 13	Bo Bice	The Real Thing	Alternative rock	RCA, 19	
December 13	Daddy Yankee	Barrio Fino en Directo	Reggaeton, hip-hop	Interscope, El Cartel	
December 13	Lamb of God	Killadelphia	Groove metal, metalcore	Epic	
December 13	YoungBloodZ	Ev'rybody Know Me	Southern hip-hop, crunk	LaFace, Zomba	
December 14	Mono and World's End Girlfriend	Palmless Prayer / Mass Murder Refrain	Post-rock, neoclassical, electronic	Human Highway Records	
December 15	Christian Bautista	Completely	Pop	Warner	
December 19	Agnes	Agnes		Columbia	
December 19	The Notorious B.I.G.	Duets: The Final Chapter	Hip-hop	Bad Boy, Atlantic	
December 19	Ryan Adams	29	Alternative country, folk rock	Lost Highway	
December 20	Jamie Foxx	Unpredictable	R&B, hip-hop, pop	J	
December 20	Mary J. Blige	The Breakthrough	R&B	Geffen	
December 27	Trick Trick	The People vs.	Hip-hop, gangsta rap	Motown	
December 28	DragonForce	Inhuman Rampage	Power metal	Noise, Sanctuary, Roadrunner	
December 30	The Strokes	First Impressions of Earth	Indie rock, garage rock revival, post-punk revival	RCA, Rough Trade	
December 31	Clipse	We Got It 4 Cheap, Vol. 2	Hip-hop	Re-Up Records	
