= Care for You =

Care for You may refer to:

- "Care for You", a song by Dokken from Hell to Pay
- "Care for You", a song by I Wayne from Life Teachings
- "Care for You", a song by K-Ci from My Book
- "Care for You", a song by Mario from Dancing Shadows
- "Care for You", a song by Saleka from Lady Raven
- "Care for You", a song by Tory Lanez from Daystar
- "Care for You", a song by Alexia Jayy

== See also ==
- I Care for You (disambiguation)
