= The Great Bludgeoning =

Studio album by Hatesphere
- Released: 23 September 2011
- Genres: Thrash metal, melodic death metal
- Length: 36:58
- Label: Napalm

Hatesphere chronology
To the Nines (2009)	The Great Bludgeoning (2011)	Murderlust (2013)

Professional ratings
Review scores
Source	Rating
Dead Rhetoric	8/10
Heavymetal.dk	9/10; 8/10
Metal.de	7/10
Rock Hard	9/10
Scream Magazine	4/6

The Great Bludgeoning is the seventh studio album by the Danish melodeath/thrash metal band Hatesphere.

== Track listing ==
1. "The Killer" – 3:32
2. "Venom" – 6:09
3. "Smell of Death" – 3:43
4. "Decayer" – 4:55
5. "The Wail of My Threnode" – 1:17
6. "Resurrect with a Vengeance" – 4:20
7. "The Great Bludgeoning" – 4:34
8. "Need to Kill" – 5:28
9. "Devil in Your Own Hell" – 3:00
