= Something Old, Something New, Something Borrowed and Something Black =

EP by Hatesphere
- Released: 8 December 2003
- Venues: Voxhall, Aarhus (live tracks)
- Genres: Death metal, thrash metal
- Length: 27:59
- Label: Scarlet

Hatesphere chronology
Bloodred Hatred (2002)	Something Old, Something New, Something Borrowed and Something Black (2003)	Ballet of the Brute (2004)

Something Old, Something New, Something Borrowed and Something Black is the first EP by the Danish death/thrash metal band Hatesphere. It was released in 2003 through Scarlet Records.

A variation on something old, something new, something borrowed, something blue, the title refers to the EP containing a new track, old tracks played live, and "borrowed" cover versions including one from the former Black Sabbath frontman.

Norway's Scream Magazine declared that the new song "really kicks ass", the live versions were well-rendered, and the Anthrax cover fit Hatesphere well. The Ozzy cover was however more of a "misplaced" offering, and the EP felt unnecessary as it was "one of those 'while-we-wait-for-the-full-length'-releases". In the band's native Denmark, Heavymetal.dk opined that "Bark at the Moon" was "the best Ozzy Osbourne cover version I have ever heard". Despite Something Old only being an "appetizer", it was worth 8 out of 10 points. Likewise, Metal Express Radio wrote that "Fans of Hatesphere need to get their hands on this release. It’s worth the coin". Powermetal.de also described the EP as "a worthwhile purchase that no melodic death/thrash maniac should miss".

Vampster similarly wrote that while many mini-albums "contain a lot of uninteresting material that isn't worth the money", the opposite was true for Something Old. It was a "gem" and was "wholeheartedly" recommended. Metal.de gave 9 of 10 points. The cover versions were the "most enjoyable", the Ozzy cover being "simply incredible". The reviewer would have liked some other songs to be chosen for the live segment, but still, with these tracks, Hatesphere "utterly obliterate 90% of the melodic death/thrash competition".

== Track listing ==
No.	Title	Length
1.	"Release the Pain"	4:07
2.	"Bark at the Moon" (Ozzy Osbourne cover)	3:50
3.	"Caught in a Mosh" (Anthrax cover)	5:13
4.	"Low Life Vendetta" (Live version)	4:37
5.	"Bloodsoil" (Live version)	4:39
6.	"Plague" (Live version)	2:15
7.	"Hate" (Live version)	3:18
