= Ballet of the Brute =

Studio album by Hatesphere
- Released: June 7, 2004
- Recorded: February 2004
- Studios: Jailhouse Studios, Horsens
- Genres: Death metal, thrash metal
- Length: 36:28
- Labels: Scarlet, Century Media
- Producers: Tommy Hansen, Jacob Bredahl and Hatesphere

Hatesphere chronology
Something Old, Something New, Something Borrowed and Something Black (2003)	Ballet of the Brute (2004)	The Killing (EP) (2005)

Professional ratings
Review scores
Source	Rating
AllMusic	3.5/5 stars
Chronicles of Chaos	8.5/10
Heavymetal.dk	7/10
Metal.de	6/10
Noise.fi	4/5
Powermetal.de	
Rock Hard	9/10
Scream Magazine	4/6
Vampster	

Ballet of the Brute is the third studio album by the Danish thrash metal band Hatesphere.

== Track listing ==
No.	Title	Length
1.	"The Beginning and the End" (intro)	1:56
2.	"Deathtrip"	1:52
3.	"Vermin"	4:38
4.	"Downward to Nothing"	2:57
5.	"Only the Strongest..."	3:52
6.	"What I See I Despise"	5:11
7.	"Last Cut, Last Head"	4:18
8.	"Warhead"	3:55
9.	"Blankeyed"	2:31
10.	"500 Dead People"	5:13

Bonus tracks (U.S. Version).
No.	Title	Writer(s)	Length
11.	"Bark at The Moon" (Ozzy Osbourne Cover)	Osbourne
12.	"Caught in a Mosh"	Anthrax cover

Bonus tracks (Japanese version).
No.	Title	Writer(s)	Length
11.	"Release The Pain"
12.	"Bark at The Moon" (Ozzy Osbourne Cover)	Osbourne
13.	"Caught in a Mosh" (Anthrax cover)	Anthrax

== Personnel ==
- Anders Gyldenøhr – drums
- Henrik Bastrup Jacobsen – guitars
- Mikael Ehlert – bass
- Peter Lyse Hansen – guitars
- Jacob Bredahl – vocals
- Additional vocals on 8: Jacob "Invocator" Hansen
- Angel voices on 10: Tommy Hansen
- All keyboards by Tommy Hansen
