= Bloodred Hatred =

Studio album by Hatesphere
- Released: 22 September 2002
- Recorded: May-June 2002
- Studios: Jailhouse Studios, Horsens
- Genres: Death metal, thrash metal
- Length: 31:56
- Labels: Scarlet, Century Media
- Producers: Jacob Hansen and Hatesphere

Hatesphere chronology
Hatesphere (2001)	Bloodred Hatred (2002)	Something Old, Something New, Something Borrowed and Something Black (2003)

Professional ratings
Review scores
Source	Rating
Heavymetal.dk	7/10
Metal.de	9/10
Powermetal.de	
Rock Hard	8.5/10
Vampster	

Bloodred Hatred is the second album released by the Danish thrash/death metal band, Hatesphere.

== Track listing ==
No.	Title	Length
1.	"Intro"	0:53
2.	"Believer"	4:43
3.	"Hell Is Here"	3:44
4.	"Insanity Arise"	3:46
5.	"Disbeliever"	3:10
6.	"Plague"	2:06
7.	"Low Life Vendetta"	4:41
8.	"Deeper And Deeper"	4:42
9.	"Kicking Ahead"	4:10

== Credits ==
- Jacob Bredahl - Vocals
- Peter Lyse Hansen - Guitar
- Niels Peter 'Ziggy' Siegfredsen - Guitar
- Mikael Ehlert Hansen - Bass
- Morten Toft Hansen - Drums
