= Greater Portmore High School =

Coordinates: 17.931748°N 76.901647°W

Information
- School type: High school
- Established: 1995; 30 years ago

Greater Portmore High School (G.P.H.S) is a government high school located in Portmore, Saint Catherine, Jamaica and founded in 1995. The school excels in rugby as four-time champions of SBR (School Boy Rugby) as well as Altogether Sing.

== Notable alumni ==
- I Wayne, reggae singer
- Leford Green, Olympian Errol Stevens, Jermaul Adair, Tyrone Lewis, Hurvin Clarke, Monique Davis, Mark Wint
