= Serpent Smiles and Killer Eyes =

Studio album by Hatesphere
- Released: April 27, 2007
- Genres: Death metal, thrash metal
- Length: 41:03
- Label: SPV Records
- Producers: Tue Madsen and Hatesphere

Hatesphere chronology
The Sickness Within (2005)	Serpent Smiles and Killer Eyes (2007)	To the Nines (2009)

Professional ratings
Review scores
Source	Rating
AllMusic	3.5/5 stars
Blabbermouth	6/10
Heavymetal.dk	9/10
Metal.de	5/10
Noise.fi	3/5 stars
Ox-Fanzine	8/10
Powermetal.de	
Rock Hard	9/10
Soundi	4/5 stars
Vampster	

Serpent Smiles and Killer Eyes is a studio album by the Danish death/thrash metal band Hatesphere.

A video for "Drinking With the King of the Dead" was released on August 6, 2007.

Serpent Smiles and Killer Eyes made it to number 26 on the Danish album top 40, which is very unusual for a thrash metal band.

== Track listing ==
No.	Title	Length
1.	"Lies and Deceit"	3:16
2.	"The Slain"	5:12
3.	"Damned Below Judas"	4:39
4.	"Drinking with the King of the Dead"	5:30
5.	"Forever War"	4:44
6.	"Feeding the Demons"	4:27
7.	"Floating"	2:56
8.	"Let Them Hate"	5:20
9.	"Absolution"	4:47
10.	"Forever War (Video)"

== Personnel ==
- Henrik "Heinz" Jacobsen - lead guitar
- Mikael Ehlert - bass
- Peter "Pepe" Hansen - rhythm guitar
- Anders Gyldenøhr - drums
- Jacob "J" Bredahl - vocals
