= To the Nines (Hatesphere album) =

Studio album by Hatesphere
- Released: 23 March 2009
- Recorded: October 2008
- Studios: Antfarm Studio in Aarhus, Denmark
- Genres: Thrash metal, melodic death metal
- Length: 34:34
- Label: Napalm
- Producer: Tue Madsen

Hatesphere chronology
Serpent Smiles and Killer Eyes (2007)	To the Nines (2009)	The Great Bludgeoning (2011)

Professional ratings
Review scores
Source	Rating
Blabbermouth	7.5/10
Exclaim!	(favorable)
Heavymetal.dk	8/10
Metal.de	6/10
Powermetal.de	4.5/10
Rock Hard	9/10

To the Nines is the sixth studio album by the Danish melodeath/thrash metal band Hatesphere. To the Nines peaked at number 36 on the Tracklisten, the Danish top 40 record chart.

== Track listing ==
No.	Title	Writer(s)	Length
1.	"To the Nines"	Jonathan Albrechtsen, Peter Lyse Hansen, Hatesphere, Mixen Lindberg, Jakob Nyholm	2:27
2.	"Backstabber"	Albrechtsen, Hansen, Hatesphere, Lindberg, Nyholm	4:26
3.	"Cloaked in Shit"	Albrechtsen, Hansen, Hatesphere	4:29
4.	"Clarity"	Hansen, Hatesphere, Lindberg	5:19
5.	"Even If It Kills Me"	Hatesphere, Lindberg, Nyholm	1:22
6.	"Commencing a Campaign"	Hansen, Hatesphere	1:11
7.	"The Writing's on the Wall"	Albrechtsen, Hansen, Hatesphere, Lindberg	3:18
8.	"In the Trenches"	Albrechtsen, Hansen, Hatesphere, Lindberg	3:15
9.	"Aurora"	Albrechtsen, Hansen, Hatesphere, Lindberg	4:06
10.	"Oceans of Blood"	Albrechtsen, Hansen, Hatesphere, Lindberg	4:43

Limited edition bonus tracks
No.	Title	Writer(s)	Length
11.	"The Coming of Chaos" (live)	Hatesphere	4:39
12.	"Cloaked in Shit" (live)	Albrechtsen, Hansen, Hatesphere	4:30
13.	"In the Trenches" (demo version)	Albrechtsen, Hansen, Hatesphere, Lindberg	3:17

== Personnel ==
- Peter "Pepe" Lyse Hansen - rhythm guitar
- Mixen Lindberg - bass guitar
- Dennis Buhl - drums
- Jakob Nyholm - lead guitar
- Jonathan "Joller" Albrechtsen - vocals
