= Reduced to Flesh =

Studio album by Hatesphere
- Released: 19 October 2018
- Genres: Thrash metal, melodic death metal
- Length: 42:47
- Label: Scarlet

Hatesphere chronology
New Hell (2015)	Reduced to Flesh (2018)	Hatred Reborn (2023)

Professional ratings
Review scores
Source	Rating
Dead Rhetoric	7.5/10
Heavymetal.dk	8/10
Metal Hammer Germany	5/7
Powermetal.de	8/10
Rock Hard	7/10

Reduced to Flesh is the tenth studio album by the Danish melodeath/thrash metal band Hatesphere, released in 2018 by Scarlet Records.

== Track listing ==
1. "Praeludium" – 2:12
2. "Corpse of Mankind" – 4:41
3. "Nothing Is Definite" – 4:41
4. "Ruled by Domination" – 5:14
5. "Reduced to Flesh" – 5:06
6. "Can of Worms" – 4:21
7. "Lethal Mistakes" – 3:01
8. "Petty" – 2:46
9. "Afterlife" – 4:59
10. "Despicable You" – 5:46
