= Murderlust =

Studio album by Hatesphere
- Released: 27 September 2013
- Genres: Thrash metal, melodic death metal
- Length: 42:03
- Label: Massacre Records

Hatesphere chronology
The Great Bludgeoning (2011)	Murderlust (2013)	New Hell (2015)

Professional ratings
Review scores
Source	Rating
Heavymetal.dk	9/10
Metal Hammer Norway	4/10
Metal.de	9/10
Ox-Fanzine	3.5/5
Powermetal.de	8/10
Rock Hard	8.5/10
Vampster	

Murderlust is the eighth studio album by the Danish melodeath/thrash metal band Hatesphere, released in 2013 by Massacre Records.

== Track listing ==
1. "Murderlust" – 3:20
2. "Pandora's Hell" – 4:05
3. "Fear Me" – 6:07
4. "The Violent Act" – 4:29
5. "Punishable by Death" – 3:47
6. "In Process" – 3:22
7. "Iconoclast" – 3:55
8. "Darkest of Forces" – 4:29
9. "Refill the Chest" – 4:31
10. "Assassin" – 3:58 (Muse cover)
