= Hatred Reborn =

Studio album by Hatesphere
- Released: 24 March 2023
- Genres: Thrash metal, melodic death metal
- Length: 49:28
- Label: Scarlet

Hatesphere chronology
Reduced to Flesh (2018)	Hatred Reborn (2023)	Guillotine (2026)

Professional ratings
Review scores
Source	Rating
Heavymetal.dk	5/10
Inferno.fi	3/5
Metal.de	6/10
Powermetal.de	8.5/10
Rock Hard	8/10
Vampster	

Hatred Reborn is the eleventh studio album by the Danish melodeath/thrash metal band Hatesphere, released in 2023 by Scarlet Records.

== Track listing ==
1. "The Awakening" – 2:23
2. "Hatred Reborn" – 4:10
3. "Cutthroat" – 4:12
4. "Gravedigger" – 3:57
5. "918" – 6:01
6. "Darkspawn" – 4:28
7. "The Truest Form of Pain" – 5:11
8. "Brand of Sacrifice" – 4:56
9. "A Violent Compulsion" – 2:10
10. "Spitting Teeth" – 4:34
11. "Another Piece of Meat" – 3:01 (bonus track, Scorpions cover)
12. "The Fallen Shall Rise in a River of Blood" – 4:25 (bonus track, live)
