= New Hell =

Studio album by Hatesphere
- Released: 20 November 2013
- Genres: Thrash metal, melodic death metal
- Length: 40:38
- Label: Massacre Records

Hatesphere chronology
Murderlust (2013)	New Hell (2013)	Reduced to Flesh (2018)

Professional ratings
Review scores
Source	Rating
Dead Rhetoric	8/10
Heavymetal.dk	6/10
Metal Hammer Germany	4/7
Metal.de	8/10
Powermetal.de	7/10
Rock Hard	7/10
Scream Magazine	4/6

New Hell is the ninth studio album by the Danish melodeath/thrash metal band Hatesphere, released in 2015 by Massacre Records.

== Track listing ==
1. "The Executioner" – 3:36
2. "Lines Crossed Lives Lost" – 4:12
3. "Head on a Spike" – 5:07
4. "The Longest Haul" – 3:57
5. "Your Sad Existence" – 2:04
6. "On the Shores of Hell" – 2:16
7. "New Hell" – 4:43
8. "Master of Betrayal" – 4:25
9. "Human Cesspool" – 4:53
10. "The Grey Mass" – 5:25
