= My Way (Akufen album) =

Studio album by Akufen
- Released: May 14, 2002
- Genre: Microhouse
- Length: 70:16
- Label: Force Inc.
- Producer: Marc Leclair

Akufen chronology
| My Way (2002) | Fabric 17 (2004) |

Singles from My Way
- 1. "Deck the House" Released: 2002; 2. "My Way" Released: 2003

Professional ratings
Review scores
| Source | Rating |
|---|---|
| AllMusic | 4.5/5 stars |
| Entertainment Weekly | B+ |
| Muzik | 4/5 stars |
| NME | 8/10 |
| Now | 4/5 |
| Pitchfork | 6.8/10 |
| Stylus Magazine | B+ |
| Uncut | 3.5/5 stars |

My Way is the debut studio album by Akufen, an alias of electronic musician Marc Leclair. The album was released by Force Inc. Records on May 14, 2002. The album has over 2000 samples of radio feed on it.

== Critical reception ==
Andy Kellman of AllMusic described the album as "a terrifically delightful, upbeat record, tipsy with buoyant basslines, swooning textures, and unorthodox hooks." Olli Siebelt of BBC said, "My Way manages to walk a fine line between full-on commercial sensibility and left-field experimentation and yet somehow pulls off both simultaneously with no compromise on either side."

The album was listed on The Wire's "2002 Rewind" list. It was named the 12th best album of the decade by Resident Advisor. In 2015, it was named the 81st greatest dance album of all time by Thump.

== Track listing ==
All tracks are written by Marc Leclair.

| No. | Title | Length |
|---|---|---|
| 1. | "Even White Horizons" | 5:28 |
| 2. | "Installation" | 8:04 |
| 3. | "Skidoos" | 8:58 |
| 4. | "Deck the House" | 6:05 |
| 5. | "Wet Floors" | 6:18 |
| 6. | "Heaven Can Wait" | 5:05 |
| 7. | "In Dog We Trust" | 7:37 |
| 8. | "Jeep Sex" | 6:06 |
| 9. | "Late Night Munchies" | 10:02 |
| 10. | "My Way" | 6:29 |
| Total length: | | 70:16 |

2002 reissue edition bonus track
| No. | Title | Length |
|---|---|---|
| 11. | "Deck the House (Herbert Stops Like This Mix)" | 5:42 |
| Total length: | | 76:21 |

== Personnel ==
Credits adapted from the original edition's liner notes.

- Marc Leclair – production
- Marc Hohmann – art direction, design
- Akiko Tsuji – art direction, design
