= Life Teachings =

Studio album by I Wayne
- Released: October 11, 2011 (U.S.)
- Recorded: 2008–2010
- Genres: Reggae, dancehall
- Label: VP
- Producer: I Wayne (executive)

I Wayne chronology
Book of Life (album) (2007)	''Life Teachings'' (2011)	TBA (2012)

Life Teachings is the third studio album from Jamaican reggae artist I Wayne. It features his typically smooth voice over typical Jamaican rhythms. The album reflects I Wayne's personal philosophy of positivism and his stance against rude boy culture, which he blames for several of Jamaica's problems.

== Track listing ==
1. "Burn Down Soddom"
2. "Real and Clean"
3. "Empress Divine"
4. "Pure As the Nile"
5. "Herb Fi Legalize"
6. "The Fire Song" Featuring Assassin
7. "Drugs and Rum Vibes"
8. "Wise and Fearless"
9. "Change Them Ways"
10. "Life Teachings (Ital Sipp'ns)"
11. "Life Joy" Featuring Etana
12. "Life Service"
13. "Care for You"
14. "Do the Good"
