= I Care for You =

"I Care for You" may refer to:

- I Care 4 U, a compilation album by American singer Aaliyah.
- "I Care 4 U" (song), a song by Aaliyah from the album I Care 4 U.
- "I Care for You" (Jennifer Braun song), a song by German singer Jennifer Braun.
- "I Care for You", a song by the American funk band Cameo from Cameosis
- "I Care for You", a song by American pop singer Jody Watley from Affection

== See also ==
- Care for You (disambiguation)
