= Hatesphere =

Danish thrash metal band

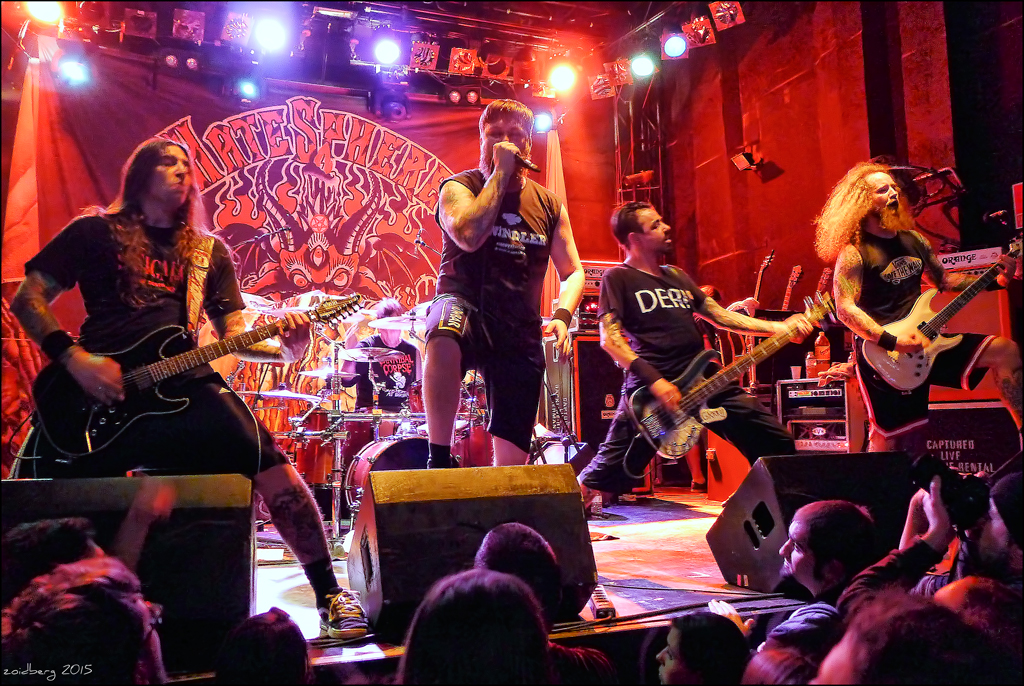
- HateSphere in 2015

Background information
- Origin: Aarhus, Denmark
- Genres: Thrash metal; death metal; melodic death metal
- Years active: 2000−present
- Labels: Scarlet, SPV, Napalm
- Members: Peter Lyse Hansen; Kasper Kirkegaard; Mike Park Nielsen; Jimmy Nedergaard; Mathias Uldall
- Past members: Mixen Lindberg Jonathan "Joller" Albrechtsen Dennis Buhl Jacob Bredahl; Henrik Jacobsen; Niels Peter "Ziggy" Siegfredsen; Morten Toft Hansen; Mikael Ehlert Hansen; Anders Gyldenøhr; Jakob Nyholm; Esben "Esse" Hansen
- Website: hatesphere.com

Hatesphere is a Danish thrash metal band from Aarhus, formed in 2000 by guitarist Peter "Pepe" Hansen. As of 2016, the band consists of vocalist Esben "Esse" Elnegaard Kjaer Hansen, guitarists Peter "Pepe" Lyse Hansen, and Kasper Kirkegaard, bass player Jimmy Nedergaard and drummer Mike Park Nielsen. The band has released ten albums and two EPs to date.

== History ==
Guitarist Peter "Pepe" Hansen formed HateShpere in Aarhus, Denmark, in 2000. Heavy metal fans across Europe acclaimed HateSphere's first three albums, Hatesphere, Bloodred Hatred and Ballet of the Brute. Under Scarlet Records, HateSphere toured Europe with The Haunted in 2003 and with Exodus in 2004. They appeared at Wacken Open Air, With Full Force, and Hellfest Festivals.

In 2005, HateSphere signed a deal with SPV and assembled a team of established Danish producers, including Tommy Hansen, Jacob Hansen, and Tue Madsen. The Sickness Within was released in September of that same year and received rave reviews from the worldwide metal media. HateSphere went on multiple tours of Europe with Kreator, Morbid Angel, Soilwork, Dark Tranquillity, and Chimaira. In addition to headlining shows in support of The Sickness Within, the band appeared at Wacken Open Air, Metal Camp, and Roskilde Festival.

HateSphere raised its international profile by touring Japan, co-headlining the UK with Gojira, and headlining the first edition of The Danish Dynamite tour with Raunchy and Volbeat. HateSphere was the first Danish band to tour China. Following the 2007 release of Serpent Smiles and Killer Eyes, HateSphere headlined Europe with Aborted and Dagoba, followed by performances at Wacken Open Air and Roskilde Festivals and a support tour of Poland with Behemoth in September.

Serpent Smiles and Killer Eyes reached 26 on the Danish National Music Charts. HateSphere amicably parted ways with vocalist Jacob Bredahl, who concentrated on other musical endeavors. HateSphere assembled a new lineup featuring frontman Joller Albrechtsen at the 2007 Danish Metal Awards (DMeA). This lineup embarked on a month-long co-headlining tour of Europe with Swedish death metal pioneers Dismember.

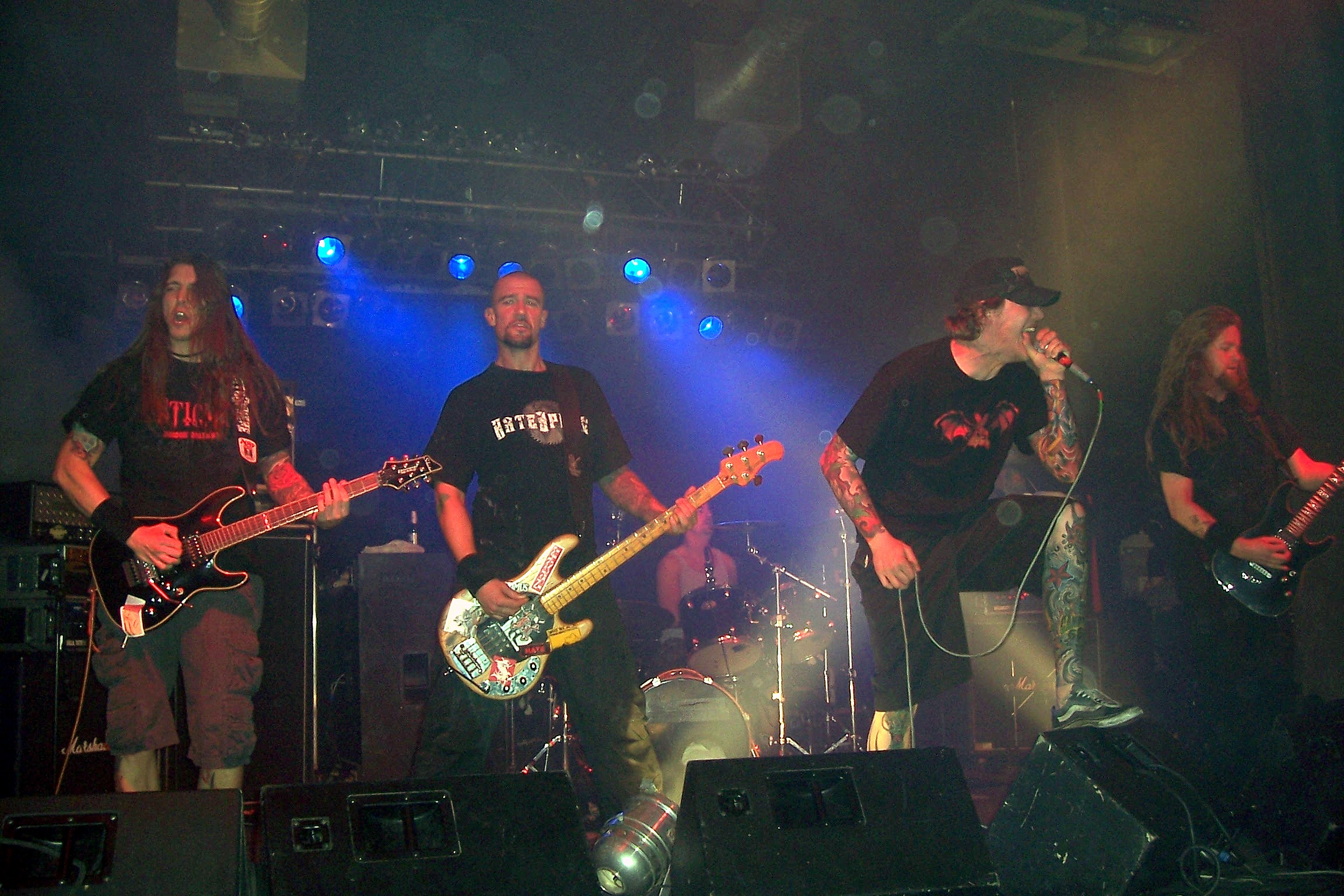
Hatesphere performing in 2005

HateSphere entered Antfarm Studios in November 2008 to record the album To the Nines. To the Nines was recorded, mixed and mastered in less than a month with producer Tue Madsen (Earth Crisis, The Haunted, Heaven Shall Burn) at AntFarm Studios in Aarhus and was released by Napalm Records.

In February 2010, vocalist Jonathan "Joller" Albrechtsen left Hatesphere. The band announced that Mevadio singer Morten "Kruge" Madsen would replace Albrechtsen on the February–March North American tour with The Black Dahlia Murder, Obscura, and Augury.

In July 2010, the band announced Esben "Esse" Hansen, also known from Danish metal band As We Fight, as Albrechtsen's permanent replacement. At the same point, bass player Mixen Lindberg left the band and was temporarily replaced with the band's former bassist and founding member Mikael Ehlert until the end of 2010. The band toured the US and Canada September–November 2010 supporting Nevermore and Parasite Inc. In May 2011, the band announced that Gob Squad bass player Jimmy Nedergaard had joined the band. The band released the album The Great Bludgeoning on 23 September 2011.

== Members ==
=== Current members ===
- Peter "Pepe" Lyse Hansen/Karmark – lead guitar (2000–present)
- Mike Park Nielsen – drums (2009–present)
- Jimmy Nedergaard – bass (2011–present)
- Kasper Kirkegaard – rhythm guitar (2016–present)
- Mathias Uldall – vocals (2022–present)

=== Touring members ===
- Morten "Kruge" Madsen – vocals (2010)
- Morten Løwe Sørensen – drums (2005)
- Henrik "Heinz" Bastrup Jacobsen – guitar (2008)
- Mikael Ehlert Hansen – bass (2010)
- Nikolaj Harlis Poulsen – bass (2013)

=== Former members ===
Vocals

- Esben "Esse" Hansen – vocals (2010–2021)
- Jacob "Dr. J" Bredahl (2000–2007)
- Jonathan "Joller" Albrechtsen (2007–2010)

Rhythm guitar

- Niels Peter "Ziggy" Siegfredsen (2000–2002)
- Henrik "Heinz" Bastrup Jacobsen (2002–2007)
- Jakob Nyholm (2007–2015)

Bass

- Mikael Ehlert Hansen (2000–2007)
- Mixen Lindberg (2007–2010)

Drums

- Morten Toft Hansen (2000–2003)
- Anders "Andy Gold" Gyldenøhr (2003–2007)
- Dennis Buhl (2007–2009)

== Discography ==
=== Studio albums ===
- Hatesphere (2001)
- Bloodred Hatred (2002)
- Ballet of the Brute (2004)
- The Sickness Within (2005)
- Serpent Smiles and Killer Eyes (2007)
- To the Nines (2009)
- The Great Bludgeoning (2011)
- Murderlust (2013)
- New Hell (2015)
- Reduced to Flesh (2018)
- Hatred Reborn (2023)
- Guillotine (2026)

=== EPs ===
- Something Old, Something New, Something Borrowed and Something Black (EP, 2003)
- The Killing (EP, 2005)

=== Split ===
- Versus (2013)

== Videography ==
- Sickness Within
- Reaper of Life
- Forever War
- Drinking with the King of the Dead
- Floating
- To the Nines
- Resurrect with a Vengeance
- Smell of Death
- Pandora's Hell
- Lines Crossed Lives Lost
- Ruled by Domination
- Cutthroat
