= The Sickness Within =

Studio album by Hatesphere
- Released: September 26, 2005
- Genres: Death metal, thrash metal
- Length: 44:39
- Label: SPV GmbH
- Producers: Tommy Hansen, Jacob Hansen and Hatesphere

Hatesphere chronology
The Killing (EP) (2005)	The Sickness Within (2005)	Serpent Smiles and Killer Eyes (2007)

Professional ratings
Review scores
Source	Rating
AllMusic	3.5/5 stars
Blabbermouth	7/10
Heavymetal.dk	9/10
Metal.de	9/10
Powermetal.de	
Rock Hard	9/10
Scream Magazine	3/6
Vampster	
Visions	9/12

The Sickness Within is the fourth studio album by the Danish death/thrash metal band Hatesphere.

== Track listing ==
No.	Title	Music	Length
1.	"The White Fever"		4:24
2.	"The Fallen Shall Rise in a River of Blood"		4:20
3.	"Reaper of Life"		4:19
4.	"Sickness Within"		3:48
5.	"Murderous Intent"	Hansen and Hatesphere	3:36
6.	"The Coming of Chaos"		4:15
7.	"Bleed to Death"		3:33
8.	"Heaven Is Ready to Fall"		4:30
9.	"Seeds of Shame"		3:48
10.	"Chamber Master"		2:57
11.	"Marked by Darkness"		5:09

== Credits ==
- Jacob Bredahl – vocals
- Peter 'Pepe' Lyse Hansen – guitar
- Henrik 'Heinz' Bastrup Jacobsen – guitar
- Mikael Ehlert – bass
- Anders Gyldenøhr – drums

Steve Smyth – additional lead guitar on 11
Tommy Hansen – all keyboards and Hammond

Produced by Tommy Hansen, Jacob Hansen and Hatesphere
