= Isolée =

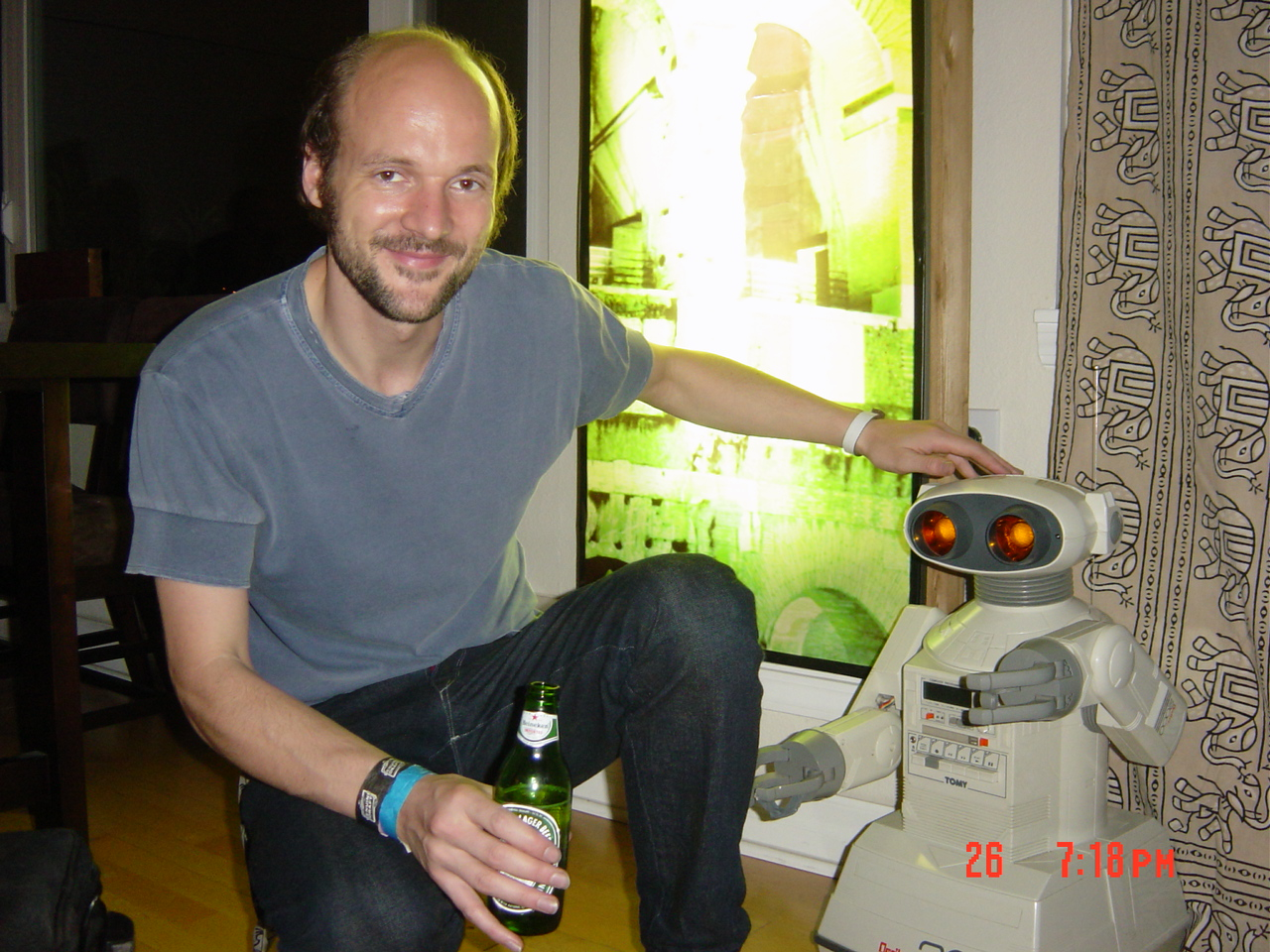
- Isolée in 2005

Background information
- Born: Rajko Müller
- Origin: Frankfurt, Germany
- Genres: Electronic, microhouse, dance, ambient techno
- Occupations: Producer, remixer
- Years active: 1998–present
- Labels: Playhouse Records
- Website: www.isolee.de

Rajko Müller, better known by his stage name Isolée, is a German electronic music producer. He is noted for his work in the microhouse genre, reminiscent of indie electronic pop music of the early eighties and ambient techno from a decade on. Isolée is credited with creating the very first microhouse record to reach the club charts. Isolée's 2000 album Rest, containing the hit "Beau Mot Plage", was arguably the first microhouse full-length.

== History ==
Rajko Müller was born in Frankfurt, Germany but lived with his family in Algeria from the age of 7 to 12 and went to a French primary school. Around that time, his parents bought an organ for Christmas and he and a school friend attempted to make some synthpop. These experiments led them to buy a synthesizer and a drum machine. By the end of the eighties, Rajko grew tired of synthpop and EBM and listened more to rock music and independent music. In the early nineties, Müller's friends led him to discover house music, hip-hop and techno, and he embarked upon a fresh attempt to record electronic music. Müller gave a tape to his friend and DJ Andreas Baumecker, owner of Freundinnen records, who worked in a record store where the members of Playhouse Records used to work.

Müller's first Isolée material appeared on the music label Playhouse in 1997. Rest, Isolée's full-length album, followed in 2000, also on Playhouse. Müller has received wide acclaim, including being listed as the third-best reviewed album of the year on Metacritic for his 2005 album We Are Monster. His work is highly regarded in underground cultures of electronic music connoisseurs and aficionados.

== Discography ==
Original albums

- Rest (2000)
- We Are Monster (2005)
- Well Spent Youth (2011)
- Resort Island (2023)

Compilations and non-album EPs

- Western Store (2006, early singles compilation)
- System (1996)
- Initiate (1998)
- WesternStore (1998)
- I Owe You (1999)
- It's About (2002)
- Can't Sleep All Night (2003)
- Brazil.com (2003)
- Hermelin (2006)
- October Nightingale (2009)
- Albacares/Les Andalouses (2009)
- The Fantastic Researches of Yushin Maru (2010)
- Allowance (2013)
- Dennis (2013)
- Mangroove (2017)
- Candy Apple Red (2020)
