= The Killing (EP) =

EP by Hatesphere
- Released: 31 January 2005
- Studios: Jailhouse Studios, Horsens, Denmark
- Genres: Death metal, thrash metal
- Length: 14:57
- Label: SPV GmbH
- Producers: Tommy Hansen, Jacob Hansen and Hatesphere

Hatesphere chronology
| Ballet of the Brute (2004) | The Killing (2005) | The Sickness Within (2005) |

Professional ratings
Review scores
| Source | Rating |
|---|---|
| Heavymetal.dk | 8/10 |
| Noise.fi | 4/5 |
| Ox-Fanzine | 8/10 |
| Powermetal.de | |
| Rock Hard | |
| Vampster | |

The Killing is the second EP by the Danish death/thrash metal band Hatesphere. The song "Murderous Intent" would later appear on their full length album The Sickness Within.

== Track listing ==
| No. | Title | Lyrics | Music | Length |
|---|---|---|---|---|
| 1. | "Murderous Intent" | Ehlert | Hansen and Hatesphere | 3:35 |
| 2. | "You're The Enemy" | Gyldenøhhr and Ehlert | Hansen, Bredahl, and Jacobsen | 3:34 |
| 3. | "The Will of God" | Hansen | Hansen and Hatesphere | 3:42 |
| 4. | "Trip At The Brain" (Suicidal Tendencies cover) | Muir | Clark | 4:06 |

== Credits ==
- Jacob Bredahl - Vocals
- Peter Lyse Hansen - Guitar
- Henrik Jacobsen - Guitar
- Mikael Ehlert - Bass
- Anders Gyldenøhhr - Drums

Produced by Tommy Hansen, Jacob Hansen and HateSphere
Mixed by Tommy Hansen and HateSphere.
