= Lava Ground =

Studio album by I Wayne
- Released: August 23, 2005 (U.S.)
- Recorded: 2004
- Genre: Reggae
- Length: 70:01
- Label: VP
- Producer: I Wayne (executive); M. Chin; P. Henry; D. Dennis; M. Miller; R. Marley; E. Lowe; W.Lewis; R.Ellis; D.Buchanan; S. Gibson; N. Listrian; M. Irving; O. Hibbert D. De'Agre; S. Facey R.Dawkins D.BESSON

I Wayne chronology
Lava Ground (2005)	Book of Life (2007)

Lava Ground is the debut album from Jamaican reggae artist I Wayne. The album features guest appearances from Fire Chess, Harmony and Fire Star. As well as production from P. Henry, M.Miller, O. Hibbert etc. The album includes the hits Living In Love and Can't Satisfy Her.

== Track listing ==
1. "Life Seeds
2. "Lava Ground"
3. "Rastafari Liveth"
4. "More Life"
5. "Bleacher"
6. "Don't Worry"
7. "Ma Ma and Pa Pa" (feat. Fire Chess)
8. "Nah Draw Nil"
9. "Touch Her Softly"
10. "Ready Fe Live Up"
11. "Kid Artist"
12. "Living in Love"
13. "Conquer" (feat. Fire Star)
14. "Can't Satisfy Her (Prelude)"
15. "Can't Satisfy Her"
16. "Grow Proper"
17. "Cool as the Breeze"
18. "Keep Burning Rome" (feat. Harmony)
