= Book of Life (album) =

Studio album by I Wayne
- Released: November 6, 2007 (U.S.)
- Recorded: 2007
- Genre: Reggae
- Label: VP
- Producer: I Wayne (executive)

I Wayne chronology
Lava Ground (2005)	Book of Life (2007)	Life Teachings (2011)

Professional ratings
Review scores
Source	Rating
AllMusic	3.5/5 stars

Book of Life is the second album by the Jamaican reggae artist I Wayne. It features his typically smooth voice over typical Jamaican rhythms. The album reflects I Wayne's personal philosophy of positivism and his stance against rude boy culture, which he blames for several of Jamaica's problems.

In "Life Is Easy," he expresses his view that the only way out of suffering is to be grateful for the positives in one's life. "Jealousy and Abuse" deals with the problem of domestic violence. "Annihilation" has a deceivingly mild and upbeat tune while calling for the annihilation of Babylon (Rastafari collectively refer to the people in power within the established system as "Babylon," and believe that they conspire to oppress the poor).

The album peaked at #4 on Billboard's Reggae Albums chart.

== Critical reception ==
AllMusic wrote that "I Wayne is actually at his best when he focuses on the reggae verities and steers clear of experimentation; the lovely 'Free the People' makes excellent use of a vintage reggae rhythm, and the album's highlight is a bouncy combination track with Deva Brat on which both singer and deejay dance lightly over a tense high-tempo rocker's beat." The East Bay Express wrote that "I Wayne comes off as an impassioned, concerned visionary, with an entire disc's work of solid songs which hint that roots reggae is actually advancing in the dancehall age." Pitchfork called the album "an absolute peach, too, providing the perfect platform for this singer's lilting alto voice to work its magic from."

== Track listing ==
1. "Book of Life"
2. "Words of Liberation"
3. "Free the People"
4. "Annihilation" (feat. Icoflamez)
5. "Smart Attack"
6. "Life Is Easy"
7. "Need Her in I Arms"
8. "No Vanity Love"
9. "Jealousy and Abuse" (feat. Lady G.)
10. "Good Enough"
11. "Politics and Religion"
12. "No Unnecessary War"
13. "Money dem a Run Down"
14. "Could a Never" (feat. Iniball)
15. "Dart to Them Heart" (feat. Deva Bratt)
16. "Natural Ites" (feat. Iyah V)
