= Akufen =

Canadian electronic musician

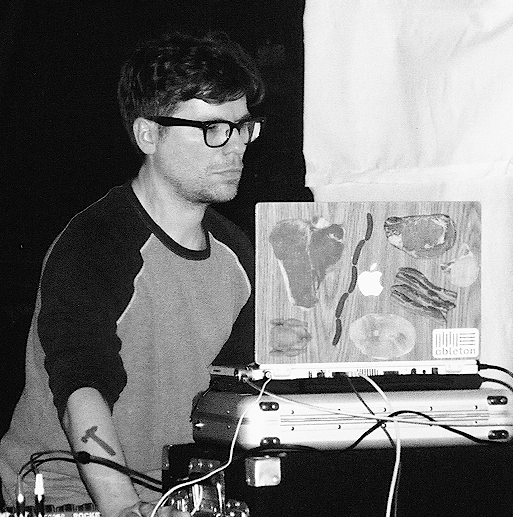
- Akufen in 2004

Background information
- Also known as: Nefuka; Anna Kaufen; Horror Inc.
- Born: Marc Leclair; August 13, 1966 (age 60)
- Origin: Montreal, Quebec, Canada
- Genres: Electronic; microhouse
- Years active: 1996–present
- Label: Force Inc.

Marc Leclair (born August 13, 1966), better known by his stage name Akufen, is a Canadian electronic musician. His music is electronic music that is often described as minimal house, minimal techno, glitch, or microhouse.

His 2002 debut studio album My Way introduced his concept of "microsampling", which was essentially a way of using extremely small and short clips of samples he had randomly recorded from FM radio broadcasts as a key musical element.

Leclair's pseudonym comes from the French word for tinnitus (ringing of the ears), acouphène, and he has also gone under the pseudonyms Horror Inc., David Scott, Nefuka, and Anna Kaufen.

== Discography ==
=== As Akufen ===
==== Studio albums ====
- My Way (2002)
- Blu TribunL (split with Freeform and the Rip Off Artist) (2004)

==== EPs ====
- Quebec Nightclub (2001)
- Hawaiian Wodka Party (2003)
- Battlestar Galacticlown (2012)

==== Mixes and remixes ====
- Fabric 17 (mix album) (2004)
- J Gabriel – "Levity" (remixes) (2020, Eyedyllic Music)

=== As Marc Leclair ===
- Musique pour 3 Femmes Enceintes (2006)

=== As Horror Inc. ===
- Briefly Eternal (2013)
