= We Are Monster =

Studio album by Isolée
- Released: 6 June 2005
- Studio: Pinnasberg 74 (Germany)
- Genre: Microhouse
- Length: 59:39
- Label: Playhouse
- Producer: Rajko Müller

Isolée chronology
Rest (2000)	We Are Monster (2005)	Well Spent Youth (2011)

We Are Monster is the second studio album by German electronic music producer Rajko Müller under the alias Isolée, released in 2005.

== Critical reception ==
Professional ratings
Aggregate scores
Source	Rating
Metacritic	89/100
Review scores
Source	Rating
AllMusic	4.5/5 stars
Cokemachineglow	80%
Now	4/5 stars
Pitchfork	8.4/10
Playlouder	4/5 stars
Q	3.5/5 stars
Stylus	A
Tiny Mix Tapes	3.5/5 stars
Tom Hull	A−
Uncut	8/10

We Are Monster was named the 53rd best album of the 2000s by Resident Advisor. "Schrapnell" was listed as the 328th best song of the 2000s by Pitchfork.

== Track listing ==
No.	Title	Length
1.	"Pictureloved"	4:37
2.	"Schrapnell"	5:23
3.	"Enrico"	5:14
4.	"Mädchen mit Hase"	6:56
5.	"My Hi-Matic"	5:58
6.	"Do Re Mi"	6:22
7.	"Face B"	5:44
8.	"Jelly Baby/Fish"	4:52
9.	"Today"	4:33
10.	"Pillowtalk"	10:00
