= Musique pour 3 Femmes Enceintes =

Studio album by Marc Leclair
- Released: April 11, 2005
- Length: 71:35
- Label: Mutek

Musique pour 3 Femmes Enceintes (lit. 'Music for 3 Pregnant Women') is a 2005 album by Marc Leclair. The album was conceived while Leclair's wife and several of her friends were simultaneously pregnant. Over the course of the album, each track is labeled according to a point in the pregnancy ("64th Day," "205th Day,") with Leclair's attempts to convey the moods of the experience.

== Production ==
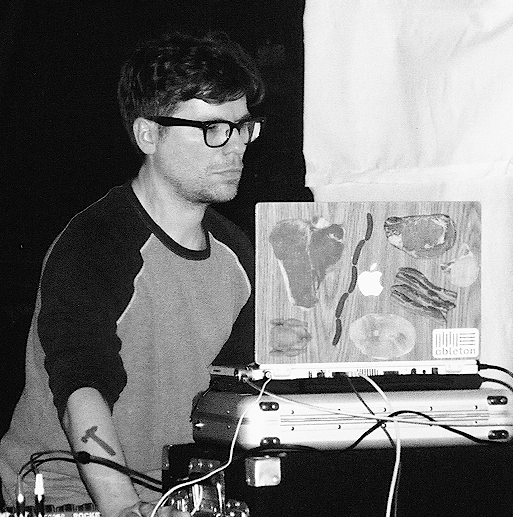
LeClair in 2004

The album began development when Leclair's wife and two close friends became pregnant around the same time. Leclair began work on what became the album, which tracks the progression of a fetus in the womb with track titles "64e Jour" (lit. '64th day'). The album attempts to convey the moods and feelings of the experience.

The track "1er Jour" is a collaboration with the German minimalists Rechenzentrum.

== Release ==
Musique pour 3 Femmes Enceintes was initially released on April 11, 2005 with what Pitchfork Media writer Mark Richardson described as a "low-key release". It was later re-issued on compact disc by Mutek Records on June 6, 2006.

== Reception ==
Professional ratings
Review scores
Source	Rating
AllMusic	4/5 stars
Montreal Mirror	(8.5/10)
Pitchfork Media	(8.1/10)
PopMatters	(5/10)
Stylus Magazine	B-

Raf Katigbak of the Montreal Mirror declared the album as "beautiful" and "a hauntingly personal album" awarding it an 8.5 out of 10 rating. Mark Richardson of Pitchfork Media gave the album an 8.1 out of ten rating declaring that "Leclair has created an excellent and varied record that sounds really good in a single go straight through." Rick Anderson stated that "there's more complexity to much of this music than initially meets the ear" and that LeClair had "succeeded at creating interesting and enjoyable music"

Dan Raper of PopMatters gave the album a five out of ten rating, finding that if the album were separated from its concept that the compositions on the album could represent anything, finding that "individual tracks take a long time to establish individual character, often expanding in warm ambient synths for a few minutes before a distinctive theme establishes itself." and that between the tracks once percussion fades "there are multiple lulls where the expected development seems to have halted." Raper concluded that the album "has some great moments" but that it could be "tough-going for those used to tracks with a beginning, a middle, and an end."

== Track listing ==
1. Marc LeClair vs. Rechenzentrum – "1er Jour" 8:41
2. "33e Jour" – 8:02
3. "64e Jour" – 5:29
4. "85e Jour" – 7:48
5. "114e Jour" – 9:48
6. "150e Jour" – 9:20
7. "180e Jour" – 7:44
8. "205e Jour" – 6:33
9. "236e Jour" – 8:10
