= I Wayne =

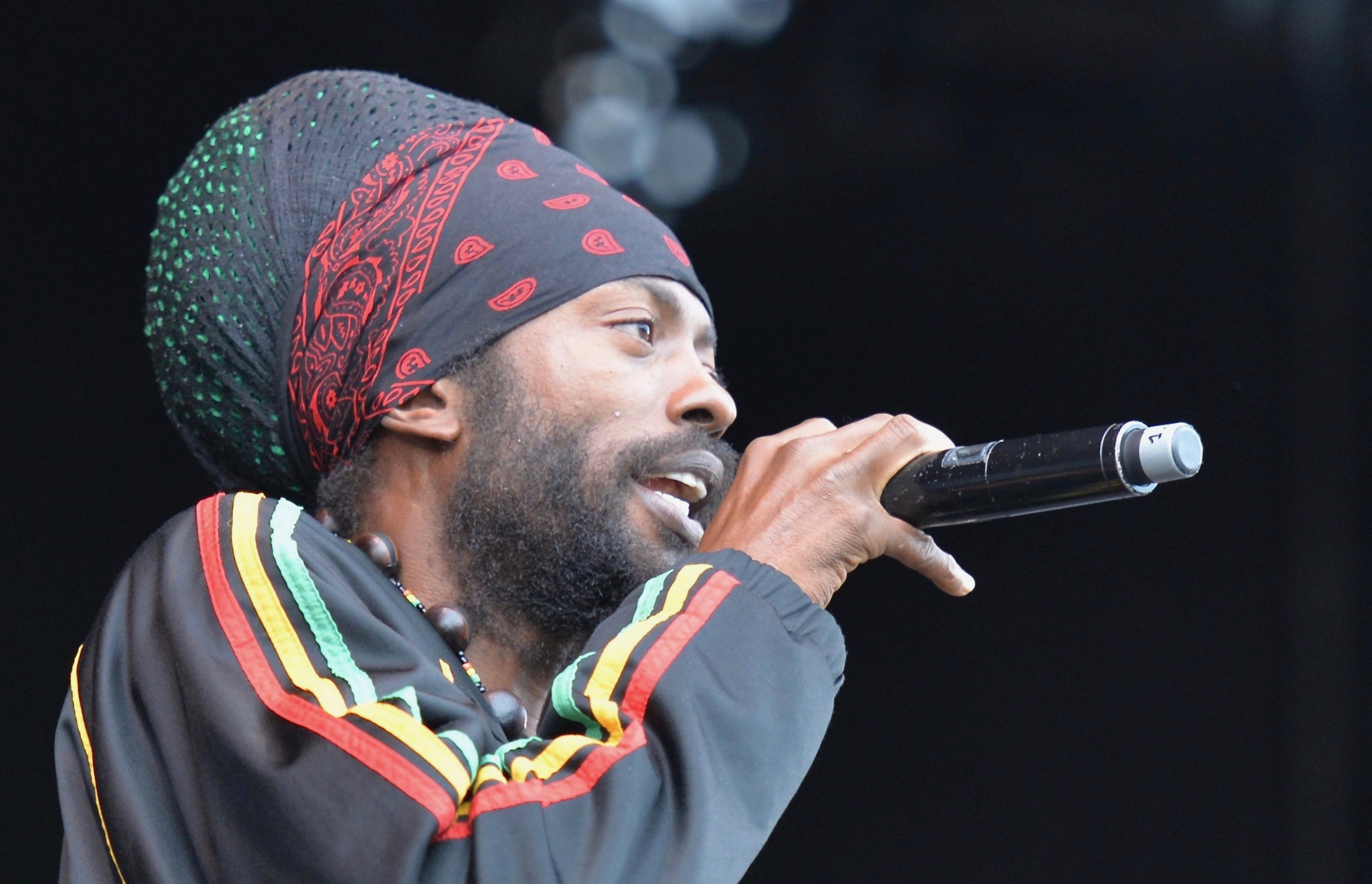
- I Wayne, Reggae Geel, 2 August 2019, Belgium.

Background information
- Born: Cliffroy Taylor; 6 August 1980 (age 46); Portmore, Jamaica
- Origin: Portmore, Jamaica
- Genres: Reggae, roots reggae, reggae ballads, Nyabinghi chants
- Occupation: Singer
- Years active: 2000–present
- Label: VP
- Website: http://www.vprecords.com/i-wayne/

I Wayne, Rastafarian stage name for Cliffroy Taylor (born August 6, 1980 in Portmore, Jamaica), is a roots reggae singer. He is known for his hit singles "Living In Love" and "Can't Satisfy Her" from his debut album, Lava Ground.

== Biography ==
I Wayne was raised by his aunt and her husband Ansell Collins, a renowned keyboard player. This young artist has been refining his craft since age seven. Coming from a musical family, I Wayne had first made his venture into performance as a student at Greater Portmore High School, joining a local group Vibes Machine. The group, consisting of singers and DJs, used to perform at afterwork parties at popular clubs such as Cactus and Asylum. One night, the artiste was forced to perform alone due to the fact that his bandmates were running late. The response was tremendous, and I Wayne was motivated to perfect his solo act.

In the summer of 2004, Wayne released Can't Satisfy Her, in the new wave of reggae. The track was reportedly the first roots reggae song to be added to the influential Hot 97 playlist.

In November 2004, I Wayne signed a recording contract with VP Records to release his debut album, Lava Ground. Lava Ground was praised for returning to reggae's "essential roots" in contrast to popular reggae artists who induce listeners to "dance and groove to their carefree music".

== Discography ==
Young Lions Volume 1 (Chuck Fender, Richie Spice, Jah Cure and I Wayne)

- Released: 7 June 2005
- Format: CD & LP
- Label: Charm, Jet Star
- Tracks: Fifteen
- Singles: "Fire Burning Red", "Living in Love", "Rome a Crumble"

Lava Ground (album)

- Released: 23 August 2005
- Format: CD _{(Catalog VP1702.2)} & LP _{(Catalog VP1702.1)}
- Label: VP Records
- Producer: Patrick Henry, & Nigel Burrel
- Director: Nigel Burrel
- Chart position: Top Reggae Albums: 5
- Tracks: Eighteen
- Singles: "Living In Love", "Can't Satisfy Her"

Book of Life (album)

- Released: 6 November 2007
- Format: CD _{(Catalog VP1798.2)} & LP _{(Catalog VP1798.1)}
- Label: VP Records
- Producer: Patrick Henry; Sherry Williams, Don Corleone, Garfield McKenzie, Paul "JJ" Stephenson, Imran "Fire Peter" Passard, Jon FX, Richard "Baby Lion Face" Thoma, Richard Mahabeer, Billy Zee Clarke, Cliffroy "I-Wayne" Taylor, Robert Mais, Michael "Mighty Mike" Jones, Dwight Heslop, & Ricardo "Humphry" Tickersgill
- Chart position: Top Reggae Albums: 4
- Tracks: Sixteen
- Singles: "Book of Life", "Need Her in I Arms"

Life Teachings (album)

- Released: 11 October 2011
- Format: CD _{(Catalog VP1798.2)} & LP _{(Catalog VP1798.1)}
- Label: VP Records
- Tracks: Fourteen
