= List of 2011 albums =

The following is a list of albums, EPs, and mixtapes released in 2011. These albums are (1) original, i.e. excluding reissues, remasters, and compilations of previously released recordings, and (2) notable, defined as having received significant coverage from reliable sources independent of the subject.

For additional information for deaths of musicians and for links to other music lists, see 2011 in music.

== First quarter ==
=== January ===
List of albums released in January 2011
Go to: January | February | March | April | May | June | July | August | September | October | November | December | Back to top
Release date	Artist	Album	Genre	Label	Ref.
January 7	Iceage	New Brigade	Art punk, garage rock, no wave	What's Your Rupture?	
January 7	Jenn Grant	Honeymoon Punch		Six Shooter	
January 9	Ed Sheeran	No. 5 Collaborations Project	Acoustic, folk, pop rap	Ed Sheeran	
January 10	British Sea Power	Valhalla Dancehall	Alternative rock, indie rock	Rough Trade	
January 10	Emma's Imagination	Stand Still	Indie pop	Future, Polydor	
January 10	MBLAQ	BLAQ Style	Dance, R&B	J. Tune	
January 11	Cage the Elephant	Thank You, Happy Birthday	Alternative rock, garage rock, indie rock	Jive	
January 11	Cake	Showroom of Compassion	Alternative rock	Upbeat	
January 11	Edie Brickell	Edie Brickell	Folk rock	RacecarLOTTA Records	
January 11	Joyce Manor	Joyce Manor	Punk rock, indie rock, pop-punk	Asian Man	
January 11	Lecrae	Rehab: The Overdose	Christian hip-hop	Reach	
January 11	Schoolboy Q	Setbacks	West Coast hip-hop, hip-hop	TDE	
January 11	Steel Magnolia	Steel Magnolia	Country	Big Machine	
January 11	Tapes 'n Tapes	Outside	Indie rock	Ibid Records	
January 12	Stratovarius	Elysium	Power metal, progressive metal, neoclassical metal	Victor	
January 13	Awol One and Factor Chandelier	The Landmark	Hip-hop	Fake Four Inc.	
January 14	Anna Calvi	Anna Calvi	Art rock	Domino	
January 14	The Decemberists	The King Is Dead	Indie folk, indie rock, folk rock	Capitol, Rough Trade	
January 17	Covenant	Modern Ruin	Synth-pop, futurepop, industrial	Metropolis	
January 17	Pearl Jam	Live on Ten Legs	Alternative rock, grunge, hard rock	Monkeywrench	
January 17	White Lies	Ritual	Indie rock, post-punk revival	Fiction	
January 18	The Aquabats	Hi-Five Soup!	Pop-punk, new wave, synth-pop	Fearless	
January 18	Brandon Heath	Leaving Eden	Contemporary Christian	Reunion	
January 18	Cowboy Junkies	Demons	Alternative country	Latent, Zoë	
January 18	Eulogies	Tear the Fences Down		Dangerbird	
January 18	Social Distortion	Hard Times and Nursery Rhymes	Punk rock, cowpunk, roots rock	Epitaph	
January 18	Times of Grace	The Hymn of a Broken Man	Metalcore, alternative metal	Roadrunner	
January 19	Architects	The Here and Now	Metalcore, post-hardcore, melodic hardcore	Century Media	
January 20	Seungri	V.V.I.P	R&B, dance-pop, pop	YG	
January 21	Amanda Palmer	Amanda Palmer Goes Down Under	Alternative rock, dark cabaret	Liberator Music	
January 21	John Waite	Rough & Tumble		Frontiers	
January 21	Sirenia	The Enigma of Life	Symphonic metal	Nuclear Blast	
January 24	Adele	21	Soul, pop, R&B	XL, Columbia	
January 24	Gang of Four	Content	Alternative rock	Grönland, Yep Roc	
January 24	The Streets	Cyberspace and Reds		The Streets	
January 25	Amos Lee	Mission Bell	Folk, neo soul	Blue Note	
January 25	Cold War Kids	Mine Is Yours	Indie rock	Downtown, Interscope, V2	
January 25	Corinne Bailey Rae	The Love EP		Capitol	
January 25	Deerhoof	Deerhoof vs. Evil	Indie rock, experimental rock	Polyvinyl	
January 25	Destroyer	Kaputt	Soft rock, smooth jazz, synth-pop	Merge, Dead Oceans	
January 25	The Ex	Catch My Shoe	Art punk, noise rock	Fish Tank Records, Carrot Top Records	
January 25	The Gaddabouts	The Gaddabouts	Folk rock	RacecarLOTTA Records	
January 25	The Get Up Kids	There Are Rules	Indie rock, new wave, post-punk	Quality Hill	
January 25	Iron & Wine	Kiss Each Other Clean	Indie folk, indie pop, blues	Warner Bros., 4AD	
January 25	Lori McKenna	Lorraine	Folk	Signature Sounds	
January 25	Roger Miret and the Disasters	Gotta Get Up Now	Street punk	Century Media	
January 25	Talib Kweli	Gutter Rainbows	Hip-hop	Javotti Media	
January 25	Ulcerate	The Destroyers of All	Technical death metal	Willowtip Records	
January 25	Vinicius Cantuária and Bill Frisell	Lágrimas Mexicanas	World	Naïve	
January 26	Battlelore	Doombound	Symphonic metal, gothic metal	Napalm	
January 28	Chase & Status	No More Idols	Drum and bass, electronic rock, dubstep	Vertigo, Mercury, RAM	
January 28	Hercules and Love Affair	Blue Songs	Nu-disco, house	Moshi Moshi	
January 28	Nicolas Jaar	Space Is Only Noise	Electronic, experimental	Circus Company	
January 28	Pavlov's Dog	Live and Unleashed	Progressive rock, art rock	Rockville Music	
January 31	The Go! Team	Rolling Blackouts	Indie pop, alternative dance, alternative hip-hop	Memphis Industries	
January 31	Ricky Martin	Música + Alma + Sexo	Pop, pop rock, reggae	Columbia, Sony Music Latin	
January 31	Seefeel	Seefeel		Warp	

=== February ===
List of albums released in February 2011
Go to: January | February | March | April | May | June | July | August | September | October | November | December | Back to top
Release date	Artist	Album	Genre	Label	Ref.
February 1	Abysmal Dawn	Leveling the Plane of Existence	Death metal	Relapse	
February 1	Christine Fellows	Femmes de chez nous		Six Shooter	
February 1	The Civil Wars	Barton Hollow	Folk rock, alternative country, indie folk	sensibility	
February 1	Lazarus A.D.	Black Rivers Flow	Thrash metal	Metal Blade	
February 1	Matisyahu	Live at Stubb's, Vol. 2	Reggae	MRI Associated Labels	
February 1	Red	Until We Have Faces	Christian rock, alternative rock, post-grunge	Essential, Sony Music	
February 4	...And You Will Know Us by the Trail of Dead	Tao of the Dead	Alternative rock, post-hardcore, progressive rock	Richter Scale, Superball Music, Century Media	
February 4	Cut Copy	Zonoscope	Synth-pop, indie electronic, dance-rock	Modular	
February 7	The Boxer Rebellion	The Cold Still	Indie rock	Absentee Recordings	
February 7	James Blake	James Blake	Electro-soul	ATLAS	
February 7	The Streets	Computers and Blues		Atlantic	
February 7	Teddy Thompson	Bella	Pop, folk	Decca, Verve Forecast	
February 8	Akron/Family	Akron/Family II: The Cosmic Birth and Journey of Shinju TNT	Folk, psychedelic rock, experimental rock	Dead Oceans	
February 8	Crowbar	Sever the Wicked Hand	Sludge metal	E1 Music, Housecore, Century Media	
February 8	Hawk Nelson	Crazy Love	Christian rock, pop-punk, punk rock	BEC	
February 8	Miles Davis	Bitches Brew Live	Jazz	Columbia, Legacy	
February 8	Nicole Atkins	Mondo Amore	Indie rock	Razor & Tie	
February 8	Peaking Lights	936	Neo-psychedelia, dub	Not Not Fun, Weird World	
February 8	Slaughterhouse	Slaughterhouse	Hardcore hip-hop, underground hip-hop	E1	
February 8	Yanni	Truth of Touch	Easy listening, new-age	Yanni/Wake Entertainment	
February 9	Alexandros	I Wanna Go to Hawaii.	Alternative rock, indie rock	RX-Records	
February 11	Roxette	Charm School	Power pop	EMI	
February 14	Asobi Seksu	Fluorescence	Shoegaze, dream pop	Polyvinyl	
February 14	The Babies	The Babies	Indie rock	Shrimper Records	
February 14	Drive-By Truckers	Go-Go Boots	R&B, Southern soul	ATO, Play It Again Sam	
February 14	Gay for Johnny Depp	What Doesn't Kill You, Eventually Kills You	Hardcore	Captains of Industry	
February 14	Mogwai	Hardcore Will Never Die, but You Will	Post-rock	Rock Action	
February 14	PJ Harvey	Let England Shake	Folk rock	Island, Vagrant	
February 14	Tim Hecker	Ravedeath, 1972	Ambient, drone, experimental	Kranky	
February 14	The Twilight Singers	Dynamite Steps	Indie rock	Sub Pop	
February 15	Bright Eyes	The People's Key	Indie rock, indie pop	Saddle Creek	
February 15	The Dears	Degeneration Street	Indie rock	Dangerbird, Pheromone Recordings	
February 15	Emmure	Speaker of the Dead	Metalcore	Victory	
February 15	Five O'Clock Heroes	Different Times		Glaze Records	
February 15	Hayes Carll	KMAG YOYO	Americana, country	Lost Highway	
February 15	Rev Theory	Justice	Hard rock, heavy metal	Interscope	
February 15	Runner Runner	Runner Runner	Pop rock, power pop	Worldwide Pants, Capitol, Merovingian Music	
February 15	Sims	Bad Time Zoo	Hip-hop, alternative hip-hop	Doomtree	
February 15	A Skylit Drive	Identity on Fire	Post-hardcore, screamo, metalcore	Fearless, Hassle	
February 15	Yuck	Yuck	Indie rock, noise rock, shoegaze	Fat Possum, Mercury	
February 16	Frank Ocean	Nostalgia, Ultra	Alternative R&B		
February 18	Radiohead	The King of Limbs	Experimental rock, electronic	Radiohead	
February 21	Deicide	To Hell with God	Death metal	Century Media	
February 21	Gil Scott-Heron and Jamie xx	We're New Here	Post-dubstep	Young Turks, XL	
February 21	Stateless	Matilda	Electronica, alternative rock, trip hop	Ninja Tune	
February 21	Thirteen Senses	Crystal Sounds			
February 22	The Aggrolites	Rugged Road	Reggae	Young Cub Records	
February 22	Bayside	Killing Time	Punk rock, melodic hardcore, alternative rock	Wind-up	
February 22	Colin Stetson	New History Warfare Vol. 2: Judges	Postminimalism, experimental	Constellation	
February 22	Danielson	Best of Gloucester County	Alternative rock	Sounds Familyre, Fire	
February 22	DevilDriver	Beast	Groove metal, melodic death metal	Roadrunner	
February 22	Earth	Angels of Darkness, Demons of Light I	Experimental rock, post-rock	Southern Lord	
February 22	I See Stars	The End of the World Party	Electronicore	Sumerian	
February 22	Patrick Stump	Truant Wave	R&B, synth-pop, alternative rock	Nervous Breakdance Media	
February 23	Beady Eye	Different Gear, Still Speeding	Britpop	Beady Eye Records	
February 25	Alexis Jordan	Alexis Jordan	Dance-pop, pop, R&B	Roc Nation, StarRoc, Columbia	
February 25	In Extremo	Sterneneisen			
February 25	Jessie J	Who You Are	Pop	Lava, Island, Universal Republic	
February 25	Lykke Li	Wounded Rhymes	Indie pop, electropop	Atlantic	
February 25	Vijay Iyer with Prasanna and Nitin Mitta	Tirtha	Jazz	ACT Music	
February 28	Clare Maguire	Light After Dark	Pop, electropop, soul	Polydor	
February 28	DeVotchKa	100 Lovers	Indie folk, gypsy punk	Anti-	
February 28	Schandmaul	Traumtänzer	Medieval folk rock, folk rock, folk metal	Fame Recordings	

=== March ===
List of albums released in March 2011
Go to: January | February | March | April | May | June | July | August | September | October | November | December | Back to top
Release date	Artist	Album	Genre	Label	Ref.
March 1	Dropkick Murphys	Going Out in Style	Celtic punk, folk punk	Born & Bred Records	
March 1	Dum Dum Girls	He Gets Me High		Sub Pop	
March 1	Eisley	The Valley		Equal Vision	
March 1	Go Radio	Lucky Street	Pop rock, alternative rock	Fearless	
March 1	Lucinda Williams	Blessed		Lost Highway	
March 1	The Rural Alberta Advantage	Departing	Indie rock	Saddle Creek, Paper Bag	
March 1	Scale the Summit	The Collective	Heavy metal	Prosthetic	
March 2	Avril Lavigne	Goodbye Lullaby	Pop rock	RCA	
March 4	Elbow	Build a Rocket Boys!	Alternative rock, indie rock	Fiction, Polydor	
March 4	Noah and the Whale	Last Night on Earth	Indie pop	Mercury	
March 7	Blancmange	Blanc Burn	New wave, synth-pop	Proper	
March 7	Erland and the Carnival	Nightingale	Neofolk	Full Time Hobby	
March 7	Jesca Hoop	Snowglobe	Folk	Last Laugh Records, Republic of Music	
March 7	Lupe Fiasco	Lasers	Hip-hop	1st & 15th, Atlantic	
March 7	R.E.M.	Collapse into Now	Alternative rock	Warner Bros.	
March 8	Childish Gambino	EP	Hip-hop		
March 8	Children of Bodom	Relentless Reckless Forever	Melodic death metal, thrash metal	Spinefarm, Fearless, Nuclear Blast	
March 8	The Color Morale	My Devil in Your Eyes	Metalcore, post-hardcore	Rise	
March 8	Dance Gavin Dance	Downtown Battle Mountain II	Post-hardcore, experimental rock	Rise	
March 8	The Human Abstract	Digital Veil	Progressive metal, neoclassical metal, metalcore	E1	
March 8	Kurt Vile	Smoke Ring for My Halo	Indie rock, lo-fi	Matador	
March 8	Mayday Parade	Valdosta	Acoustic, alternative rock	Fearless, Atlantic	
March 8	Raekwon	Shaolin vs. Wu-Tang	Hip-hop	Ice H2O, EMI	
March 8	Rival Schools	Pedals	Emo, pop rock, post-hardcore	Photo Finish	
March 8	Sara Evans	Stronger	Country	RCA Nashville	
March 8	Starfucker	Reptilians	Indie rock, electronic, synth-pop	Polyvinyls	
March 8	Trust Company	Dreaming in Black and White	Nu metal	Entertainment One	
March 8	Wye Oak	Civilian	Indie rock, indie folk	Merge, City Slang	
March 9	Whitesnake	Forevermore	Hard rock	Frontiers, WEA	
March 11	Sylosis	Edge of the Earth	Thrash metal, progressive metal	Nuclear Blast	
March 11	The Vaccines	What Did You Expect from the Vaccines?	Indie rock, garage pop, surf punk	Columbia	
March 12	Imagine Dragons	It's Time	Alternative rock, indie rock, pop rock	Imagine Dragons	
March 13	Cornershop	Cornershop and the Double 'O' Groove Of		Ample Play Records	
March 14	Funeral for a Friend	Welcome Home Armageddon	Post-hardcore, melodic hardcore	Distiller Records, Good Fight Music	
March 14	Hype Williams	One Nation	Hypnagogic pop	Hippos in Tanks	
March 14	Oh Land	Oh Land	Club, dance, electropop	Fake Diamond, Epic, A:larm Music	
March 14	Tennant/Lowe	The Most Incredible Thing	Electronic, classical	Parlophone	
March 14	The Unthanks	Last	Folk	EMI, Rough Trade	
March 14	Yelle	Safari Disco Club	Electropop, synth-pop	Barclay	
March 15	As Blood Runs Black	Instinct	Deathcore, melodic death metal	Mediaskare	
March 15	Awolnation	Megalithic Symphony	Indie rock, electronic rock, alternative rock	Red Bull	
March 15	The Chemical Brothers	Hanna	Electronica	Back Lot Music, Relativity, Sony Classical	
March 15	The Dodos	No Color	Indie folk, Alternative rock	Frenchkiss	
March 15	J Mascis	Several Shades of Why	Folk rock	Sub Pop	
March 15	New York Dolls	Dancing Backward in High Heels	Glam punk, rock and roll	429	
March 15	Rise Against	Endgame	Melodic hardcore	DGC, Interscope	
March 15	Travis Barker	Give the Drummer Some	Rap rock	Interscope	
March 16	Boris	New Album	Alternative rock	Tearbridge, Daymare, Sargent House	
March 17	Underworld	Frankenstein: Music from the Play		underworldlive.com	
March 18	Chris Brown	F.A.M.E.	R&B, pop, hip-hop	Jive	
March 18	Edita Abdieski	One		Sony Music	
March 18	Kesha	I Am the Dance Commander + I Command You to Dance: The Remix Album		RCA	
March 18	Nicole Scherzinger	Killer Love	Pop, Eurodance, R&B	Interscope	
March 18	The Strokes	Angles	Indie rock, power pop	RCA	
March 19	The Dead Milkmen	The King in Yellow	Punk rock, alternative rock	The Dead Milkmen	
March 21	CNBLUE	First Step	Rock	FNC	
March 21	The Human League	Credo	Synth-pop	Wall of Sound	
March 21	Kassidy	Hope St.	Alternative rock	Mercury	
March 21	Roddy Woomble	The Impossible Song & Other Songs	Folk	Greenvoe Records	
March 21	The Weeknd	House of Balloons	Alternative R&B	XO	
March 22	Agnostic Front	My Life My Way	Hardcore punk	Nuclear Blast	
March 22	Art of Dying	Vices and Virtues	Hard rock, post-grunge	Reprise	
March 22	CunninLynguists	Oneirology	Alternative hip-hop	QN5 Music, APOS Music	
March 22	Green Day	Awesome as Fuck	Punk rock	Reprise	
March 22	Jennifer Hudson	I Remember Me	R&B	Arista, J	
March 22	Kirk Franklin	Hello Fear	Urban contemporary gospel	Verity	
March 22	The Lonely Forest	Arrows	Alternative rock, indie rock, emo	Trans Records	
March 22	Panic! at the Disco	Vices & Virtues	Alternative rock, pop rock, emo pop	Decaydance, Fueled by Ramen	
March 22	Protest the Hero	Scurrilous	Progressive metal, post-hardcore, thrash metal	Underground Operations, Vagrant	
March 22	Soundgarden	Live on I-5	Alternative metal, grunge, alternative rock	A&M	
March 22	Tommy Shaw	The Great Divide	Bluegrass	Pazzo Music	
March 22	Yellowcard	When You're Through Thinking, Say Yes	Pop-punk	Hopeless	
March 22	Zion I and the Grouch	Heroes in the Healing of the Nation	Hip-hop	Z & G Music	
March 25	Britney Spears	Femme Fatale	Dance-pop, electropop	Jive	
March 25	Gevolt	AlefBase	Folk, industrial	Gevolt Productions	
March 25	Raphael Saadiq	Stone Rollin'	Rhythm and blues, rock, soul	Columbia	
March 25	Within Temptation	The Unforgiving	Symphonic metal, symphonic rock	Dragnet, Sony, Roadrunner	
March 28	Big K.R.I.T.	Return of 4Eva	Hip-hop, Southern hip-hop	Cinematic	
March 28	Blackfield	Welcome to My DNA		Kscope	
March 28	Burial	Street Halo	Downtempo, dubstep, 2-step garage	Hyperdub	
March 28	King Creosote and Jon Hopkins	Diamond Mine	Folk, folktronica	Domino	
March 29	Aiden	Disguises	Horror punk, hardcore punk, heavy metal	Victory	
March 29	Amon Amarth	Surtur Rising	Melodic death metal	Metal Blade	
March 29	Becoming the Archetype	Celestial Completion	Progressive death metal	Solid State	
March 29	Cavalera Conspiracy	Blunt Force Trauma	Groove metal, thrash metal, death metal	Roadrunner	
March 29	Emery	We Do What We Want	Post-hardcore, metalcore	Tooth & Nail, Solid State	
March 29	Havok	Time Is Up	Thrash metal	Candlelight	
March 29	The Pains of Being Pure at Heart	Belong	Indie pop, dream pop, alternative rock	Slumberland	
March 29	Snoop Dogg	Doggumentary	Hip-hop, gangsta rap		
March 29	The Sounds	Something to Die For	New wave, post-punk revival, indie rock	SideOneDummy	
March 29	Sum 41	Screaming Bloody Murder	Heavy metal, punk rock, hard rock	Island	
March 29	Wiz Khalifa	Rolling Papers	Pop-rap	Rostrum, Atlantic	

== Second quarter ==
=== April ===
List of albums released in April 2011
Go to: January | February | March | April | May | June | July | August | September | October | November | December | Back to top
Release date	Artist	Album	Genre	Label	Ref.
April 1	Katy B	On a Mission	Dance, UK garage	Columbia	
April 1	k.d. lang and the Siss Boom Bang	Sing It Loud		Nonesuch	
April 1	The Kills	Blood Pressures	Indie rock	Domino	
April 1	Natalia Kills	Perfectionist	Dance-pop, synth-pop	will.i.am, Cherrytree, KonLive	
April 4	The Blackout	Hope	Electropop, alternative metal	Cooking Vinyl	
April 4	Glasvegas	Euphoric Heartbreak	Indie rock	Columbia	
April 4	Hollywood Undead	American Tragedy	Rap rock	A&M Octone	
April 4	The Pigeon Detectives	Up, Guards and at 'Em!	Indie rock	Dance to the Radio	
April 4	The Raveonettes	Raven in the Grave		Vice	
April 4	Young Knives	Ornaments from the Silver Arcade	Indie rock, post-punk revival	Gadzook	
April 5	Asking Alexandria	Reckless & Relentless	Metalcore	Sumerian	
April 5	Bill Callahan	Apocalypse	Folk, psychedelic folk, Americana	Drag City	
April 5	Cold Cave	Cherish the Light Years	Dark wave, synth-pop	Matador	
April 5	Daft Punk	Tron: Legacy Reconfigured	House, electro house	Walt Disney	
April 5	Jim Jones	Capo	Hip-hop	E1 Music	
April 5	Timber Timbre	Creep on Creepin' On		Arts & Crafts	
April 8	Architecture in Helsinki	Moment Bends	Indie pop	Modular	
April 8	Metronomy	The English Riviera	Indietronica, new wave, electronic rock	Because	
April 8	Paul Simon	So Beautiful or So What	Folk rock	Hear Music	
April 8	Rainbow	So Girls	K-pop, dance-pop	DSP	
April 11	Crystal Stilts	In Love with Oblivion		Slumberland, Fortuna Pop!	
April 11	Daedelus	Bespoke	Electronic	Ninja Tune	
April 11	TV on the Radio	Nine Types of Light	Art rock, soul	Interscope	
April 12	Alison Krauss & Union Station	Paper Airplane	Bluegrass	Rounder	
April 12	Atmosphere	The Family Sign	Hip-hop	Rhymesayers	
April 12	Between the Buried and Me	The Parallax: Hypersleep Dialogues	Progressive metal, technical death metal, avant-garde metal	Metal Blade	
April 12	Brett Dennen	Loverboy		Dualtone	
April 12	The Feelies	Here Before	Post-punk, jangle pop, college rock	Bar/None	
April 12	Foo Fighters	Wasting Light	Alternative rock, post-grunge, hard rock	Roswell, RCA	
April 12	Low	C'mon	Dream pop, slowcore	Sub Pop	
April 12	Maná	Drama y Luz	Latin rock, pop rock	Warner Music Latina	
April 12	Panda Bear	Tomboy	Psychedelia, ambient pop	Paw Tracks	
April 12	Thursday	No Devolución	Post-hardcore, post-rock	Epitaph	
April 12	Uriah Heep	Into the Wild	Hard rock	Frontiers	
April 12	Vivian Girls	Share the Joy	Garage rock, psychedelic pop	Polyvinyl	
April 13	Mýa	K.I.S.S. (Keep It Sexy & Simple)	R&B	Manhattan, Planet 9	
April 15	Marius Neset	Golden Xplosion	Free jazz	Edition	
April 17	The King Blues	Punk & Poetry	Ska punk, alternative rock, punk rock	Transmission	
April 18	Explosions in the Sky	Take Care, Take Care, Take Care	Post-rock	Temporary Residence Limited	
April 18	Grimes and d'Eon	Darkbloom	Electropop, R&B, avant-pop	Arbutus, Hippos in Tanks	
April 18	Guillemots	Walk the River	Indie rock	Polydor	
April 18	Hugh Laurie	Let Them Talk	Blues	Warner Bros.	
April 18	Jamie Woon	Mirrorwriting		Candent Songs, Polydor	
April 18	Sophie Ellis-Bextor	Make a Scene	Dance-pop, house, nu-disco	EBGB's	
April 19	Del the Funky Homosapien	Golden Era	Hip-hop	The Council	
April 19	The Head and the Heart	The Head and the Heart	Folk rock	Sub Pop	
April 19	Loaded	The Taking	Hard rock, punk rock	Eagle Rock	
April 19	Matthewdavid	Outmind	Electronic	Brainfeeder	
April 19	Tune-Yards	Whokill	Art pop, noise pop	4AD	
April 20	Currensy and Alchemist	Covert Coup	Hip-hop	Jet Life, ALC Records	
April 20	f(x)	Pinocchio	K-pop, dance-pop, electronica	SM	
April 22	Leaves' Eyes	Meredead	Symphonic metal	Napalm	
April 22	The Wombats	This Modern Glitch	Indie pop, alternative dance, new wave	14th Floor, Bright Antenna	
April 25	Bowling for Soup	Fishin' for Woos	Pop-punk	Que-so Records, Brando Records	
April 25	Death Grips	Exmilitary	Rap rock, experimental hip-hop		
April 25	Dutch Uncles	Cadenza	Indie rock	Memphis Industries	
April 25	Girls Names	Dead to Me	Alternative rock, post-punk, surf rock	Tough Love Records, Slumberland	
April 25	Prefuse 73	The Only She Chapters		Warp	
April 25	Skindred	Union Black	Nu metal, reggae rock, electronic rock	BMG	
April 25	Ulver	Wars of the Roses	Art rock, dark ambient	Kscope	
April 26	Augustana	Augustana	Rock, pop rock, roots rock	Epic	
April 26	Bill Frisell	Sign of Life: Music for 858 Quartet	Jazz	Savoy	
April 26	Blue Sky Black Death	Noir		Fake Four Inc.	
April 26	Cass McCombs	Wit's End		Domino	
April 26	Emmylou Harris	Hard Bargain	Country folk, Americana	Nonesuch	
April 26	Joe Lally	Why Should I Get Used to It	Rock	Dischord, Tollotta	
April 26	KMFDM	WTF?!	Industrial rock, electro-industrial	Metropolis, KMFDM Records	
April 26	Krallice	Diotima	Black metal, experimental metal	Profound Lore	
April 26	Memphis May Fire	The Hollow	Metalcore, post-hardcore	Rise	
April 26	Otep	Atavist	Nu metal, groove metal	Victory	
April 26	Silverstein	Rescue	Post-hardcore, emo	Hopeless	
April 26	Steve Earle	I'll Never Get Out of This World Alive	Country, rockabilly, blues	New West	
April 27	Jay Park	Take a Deeper Look	R&B, hip-hop	SidusHQ	
April 29	Jennifer Lopez	Love?	Dance-pop, pop, R&B	Island	
April 29	Twin Atlantic	Free	Rock, alternative rock	Red Bull	
April 30	Giles Corey	Giles Corey		Enemies List Home Recordings, The Flenser	

=== May ===
List of albums released in May 2011
Go to: January | February | March | April | May | June | July | August | September | October | November | December | Back to top
Release date	Artist	Album	Genre	Label	Ref.
May 3	Beastie Boys	Hot Sauce Committee Part Two	Hip-hop, electro	Capitol	
May 3	Fleet Foxes	Helplessness Blues	Indie folk, folk rock	Sub Pop	
May 3	Sixx:A.M.	This Is Gonna Hurt	Hard rock, alternative metal	Eleven Seven Music	
May 3	Stevie Nicks	In Your Dreams	Rock	Reprise	
May 3	Title Fight	Shed		SideOneDummy	
May 6	Miles Kane	Colour of the Trap	Indie rock, alternative rock	Columbia	
May 9	Alva Noto & Ryuichi Sakamoto	Summvs	Electronic	Raster-Noton	
May 9	Manchester Orchestra	Simple Math	Indie rock, post-hardcore, symphonic rock	Favorite Gentlemen Recordings	
May 9	Wild Beasts	Smother	Indie rock, dream pop	Domino	
May 9	Young Legionnaire	Crisis Works	Post-hardcore	Wichita	
May 9	The Zombies	Breathe Out, Breathe In	Pop rock	Rhino	
May 10	The Antlers	Burst Apart	Indie rock, chamber pop	Frenchkiss, Transgressive	
May 10	The Cars	Move Like This	Art rock, garage rock, power pop	Hear Music, Concord Bicycle	
May 10	The Lonely Island	Turtleneck & Chain	Comedy hip-hop, hip-hop, electro	Universal Republic	
May 10	Lou Canon	Lou Canon		Hardwood, Universal	
May 10	Novembers Doom	Aphotic	Death-doom, progressive death metal, gothic metal	The End	
May 10	Okkervil River	I Am Very Far	Indie rock, folk rock	Jagjaguwar	
May 10	Thee Oh Sees	Castlemania	Garage rock, psychedelic rock, psychedelic folk	In the Red	
May 10	Randy Newman	The Randy Newman Songbook Vol. 2		Nonesuch	
May 10	Roseanna Vitro	The Music of Randy Newman	Vocal jazz	Motéma Music	
May 10	Saul Williams	Volcanic Sunlight	Dance-pop	Columbia	
May 10	Sleeping with Sirens	Let's Cheers to This	Post-hardcore	Rise	
May 10	Sloan	The Double Cross	Power pop	Outside	
May 10	Tyler, the Creator	Goblin	Alternative hip-hop	XL	
May 10	Urge Overkill	Rock & Roll Submarine	Alternative rock	UO Records	
May 11	Krista Muir	Between Atoms			
May 11	Moving Mountains	Waves	Emo, post-rock, post-hardcore	Triple Crown	
May 12	13 & God	Own Your Ghost	Hip-hop, indie rock, electronica	Anticon, Alien Transistor	
May 13	Austra	Feel It Break	Synth-pop, dark wave	Domino	
May 13	Moby	Destroyed	Electronic	Little Idiot, Mute	
May 16	Danger Mouse & Daniele Luppi	Rome	Indie rock, folk rock	Parlophone, EMI, Lex	
May 16	Friendly Fires	Pala	Alternative dance, funk	XL	
May 16	Kate Bush	Director's Cut		Fish People, EMI	
May 16	Wadada Leo Smith	Heart's Reflections	Jazz	Cuneiform	
May 17	Arsonists Get All the Girls	Motherland	Death metal, progressive rock	Century Media	
May 17	Beast	Fiction and Fact	K-pop, dance-pop, electropop	Cube	
May 17	New Boyz	Too Cool to Care	Pop-rap	Shotty Music, Asylum, Warner Bros.	
May 17	Sarah Jarosz	Follow Me Down	Bluegrass	Sugar Hill	
May 17	Seether	Holding Onto Strings Better Left to Fray	Post-grunge, alternative metal, hard rock	Wind-up	
May 20	Whitesnake	Live at Donington 1990	Hard rock	Frontiers, Columbia Music Entertainment	
May 23	Art Brut	Brilliant! Tragic!	Indie rock, garage rock, garage punk	Cooking Vinyl, Downtown	
May 23	Foster the People	Torches	Indie pop, indietronica, synth-pop	Startime, Columbia	
May 23	Lady Gaga	Born This Way	Dance-pop	Streamline, KonLive, Interscope	
May 23	Neal Morse	Testimony 2	Progressive rock	Metal Blade, Radiant Records	
May 23	Planningtorock	W	Electronica, synth-pop	DFA, Rostron Records	
May 24	Against Me!	Total Clarity	Punk rock	Fat Wreck Chords	
May 24	Boris	Attention Please	Noise pop, dream pop, shoegaze	Sargent House	
May 24	Boris	Heavy Rocks	Stoner metal, post-metal, sludge metal	Sargent House	
May 24	For the Fallen Dreams	Back Burner	Metalcore	Rise	
May 24	Journey	Eclipse	Hard rock, arena rock, heavy metal	Nomota, Frontiers, Universal	
May 24	Stephen Marley	Revelation Pt. 1 – The Root of Life	Reggae	Universal, Tuff Gong	
May 24	Thurston Moore	Demolished Thoughts	Acoustic rock	Matador	
May 24	Los Tigres del Norte	MTV Unplugged: Los Tigres del Norte and Friends	Norteño	Fonovisa	
May 24	White Denim	D	Indie rock, garage rock, progressive rock	Downtown	
May 25	Amorphis	The Beginning of Times		Nuclear Blast	
May 27	Papa vs Pretty	United in Isolation	Rock, indie rock, alternative rock	Peace & Riot	
May 27	Status Quo	Quid Pro Quo	Hard rock, blues rock	Eagle Rock	
May 30	Blondie	Panic of Girls	Alternative rock, new wave, post-punk revival	Five Seven Music, EMI	
May 30	Jakszyk, Fripp and Collins	A Scarcity of Miracles	Ambient, progressive rock, jazz fusion	Discipline Global Mobile	
May 30	Sebastian	Total	House, electro house, experimental	Because Music, Ed Banger	
May 31	Death Cab for Cutie	Codes and Keys	Indie pop, alternative rock, indie rock	Atlantic, Barsuk	
May 31	Eddie Vedder	Ukulele Songs	Folk rock	Monkeywrench	
May 31	Flogging Molly	Speed of Darkness	Celtic punk, punk rock	Borstal Beat Records	
May 31	Matthew Good	Lights of Endangered Species	Alternative rock	Universal Music Canada	
May 31	My Morning Jacket	Circuital	Indie rock	ATO	
May 31	Vast Aire	OX 2010: A Street Odyssey	Hip-hop	Fat Beats Records, Man Bites Dog Records	

=== June ===
List of albums released in June 2011
Go to: January | February | March | April | May | June | July | August | September | October | November | December | Back to top
Release date	Artist	Album	Genre	Label	Ref.
June 3	Alestorm	Back Through Time	Power metal, folk metal	Napalm	
June 3	Def Leppard	Mirror Ball – Live & More	Heavy metal, hard rock, glam metal	Bludgeon Riffola	
June 3	Falconer	Armod	Folk metal	Metal Blade	
June 3	Jackie Evancho	Dream with Me	Classical crossover	Columbia, 143, Syco	
June 3	Kaiser Chiefs	The Future Is Medieval	Indie rock	Fiction, B-Unique, Universal	
June 3	Saxon	Call to Arms	Heavy metal	Militia Guard Music, UDR, EMI	
June 3	The Vines	Future Primitive	Alternative rock, garage rock, neo-psychedelia	Sony Music	
June 5	Anna Nalick	Broken Doll & Odds & Ends	Pop rock, acoustic	Nyctograph Records	
June 6	All Time Low	Dirty Work	Emo pop, pop rock	Interscope	
June 6	Arctic Monkeys	Suck It and See	Indie rock, psychedelic rock, garage rock	Domino	
June 6	Battles	Gloss Drop	Experimental rock, math rock	Warp	
June 6	Frank Turner	England Keep My Bones		Xtra Mile	
June 6	Fucked Up	David Comes to Life	Hardcore punk, punk rock, indie rock	Matador	
June 6	Martin Solveig	Smash	House	Mixture Stereophonic, Mercury	
June 7	Adelitas Way	Home School Valedictorian	Alternative metal, hard rock, post-grunge	Virgin	
June 7	Atari Teenage Riot	Is This Hyperreal?	Digital hardcore, noise, electronic	Digital Hardcore, Dim Mak	
June 7	Benny Benassi	Electroman	Progressive house, electro house, dance-pop	Ultra Music	
June 7	Black Lips	Arabia Mountain	Garage rock, garage punk	Vice	
June 7	City and Colour	Little Hell	Indie rock, alternative rock	Dine Alone, Vagrant	
June 7	The Coathangers	Larceny & Old Lace	Punk rock	Suicide Squeeze	
June 7	Cults	Cults	Indie pop, noise pop	In the Name Of, Columbia	
June 7	Dawes	Nothing Is Wrong	Folk rock, roots rock	ATO	
June 7	Ford & Lopatin	Channel Pressure	Synth-funk	Software Recording Co.	
June 7	Lee Konitz	Live at Birdland	Jazz	ECM	
June 7	Morbid Angel	Illud Divinum Insanus	Death metal, industrial metal	Season of Mist	
June 7	Tech N9ne	All 6's and 7's	Hardcore hip-hop	Strange Music	
June 7	Touché Amoré	Parting the Sea Between Brightness and Me	Post-hardcore, melodic hardcore, screamo	Deathwish	
June 7	Tricia Brock	The Road	Contemporary Christian, worship	Inpop	
June 11	Burgerkill	Venomous	Groove metal, death metal	Xenophobic, Revolt!	
June 13	Emmy the Great	Virtue	Alternative rock, anti-folk	Close Harbour Records	
June 13	Junior Boys	It's All True	Synth-pop	Domino	
June 13	WU LYF	Go Tell Fire to the Mountain	Indie rock, post-rock, art rock	LYF Recordings	
June 14	Bad Meets Evil	Hell: The Sequel	Hip-hop	Shady, Interscope	
June 14	Black Veil Brides	Set the World on Fire	Glam metal, hard rock, heavy metal	Lava, Universal Republic	
June 14	Dananananaykroyd	There Is a Way	Post-hardcore, alternative rock	Pizza College	
June 14	The Dear Hunter	The Color Spectrum	Progressive rock, experimental rock, alternative rock	Triple Crown	
June 14	Ledisi	Pieces of Me	R&B	Verve Forecast	
June 14	Marissa Nadler	Marissa Nadler	Folk, country	Box of Cedar Records	
June 14	Michael Franks	Time Together	Jazz, vocal jazz, smooth jazz	Shanachie	
June 14	Neil Young	A Treasure	Country, rock	Reprise	
June 14	Of Mice & Men	The Flood	Metalcore, post-hardcore	Rise	
June 14	Owl City	All Things Bright and Beautiful	Synth-pop, indietronica, electropop	Universal Republic	
June 14	Random Axe	Random Axe	Hip-hop	Duck Down Music	
June 14	Various artists	Cars 2 soundtrack		Walt Disney	
June 14	The Wonder Years	Suburbia I've Given You All and Now I'm Nothing	Emo, pop-punk, melodic hardcore	Hopeless	
June 14	Woods	Sun and Shade	Folk, psychedelic folk	Woodsist	
June 14	Ziggy Marley	Wild and Free	Reggae	Tuff Gong Worldwide	
June 15	In Flames	Sounds of a Playground Fading	Alternative metal	Century Media, Razzia	
June 15	Versailles	Holy Grail	Neoclassical metal, symphonic power metal	Warner Music Japan	
June 17	The Black Dahlia Murder	Ritual	Melodic death metal	Metal Blade	
June 17	Bon Iver	Bon Iver	Post-rock, chamber folk, chamber pop	Jagjaguwar, 4AD	
June 17	Cascada	Original Me	Dance-pop, electropop	Zooland Records, Universal	
June 17	LMFAO	Sorry for Party Rocking	Hip house	Interscope	
June 17	Pitbull	Planet Pit	Dance-pop, hip-hop, hip house	Polo Grounds Music, J, Sony Music	
June 17	Rhapsody of Fire	From Chaos to Eternity	Symphonic power metal, neoclassical metal	Nuclear Blast	
June 17	Symphony X	Iconoclast	Progressive metal, neoclassical metal, power metal	Nuclear Blast	
June 20	2PM	Hands Up	Electronic, R&B, hip-hop	JYP	
June 20	Devin Townsend Project	Deconstruction	Progressive metal, symphonic metal, industrial metal	HevyDevy, Inside Out	
June 20	Devin Townsend Project	Ghost	New-age, progressive rock, experimental rock	HevyDevy, Inside Out	
June 20	The Feeling	Together We Were Made	Pop, electro rock	UMG, Island	
June 20	Patrick Wolf	Lupercalia	Indie pop	Mercury	
June 20	Ty Segall	Goodbye Bread	Garage rock, folk rock	Drag City	
June 20	Wiley	100% Publishing	Grime	Big Dada	
June 21	August Burns Red	Leveler	Melodic metalcore	Solid State	
June 21	The Crimson Armada	Conviction	Metalcore	Artery	
June 21	Crossfade	We All Bleed	Post-grunge, alternative metal	Eleven Seven	
June 21	Grieves	Together/Apart	Hip-hop	Rhymesayers	
June 21	Jill Scott	The Light of the Sun	Neo soul	Blue Babe Records, Warner Bros.	
June 21	Matt Nathanson	Modern Love	Pop rock	Vangaurd	
June 21	Peter Furler	On Fire	Contemporary Christian, pop rock	Sparrow	
June 21	Queensrÿche	Dedicated to Chaos	Alternative metal, progressive rock	Loud & Proud, Roadrunner	
June 21	Selena Gomez & the Scene	When the Sun Goes Down	Electropop, dance-pop	Hollywood	
June 21	Simple Plan	Get Your Heart On!	Pop-punk, power pop, pop rock	Atlantic	
June 21	The Story So Far	Under Soil and Dirt	Pop-punk	Pure Noise	
June 21	Tally Hall	Good & Evil	Alternative rock	Quack! Media	
June 21	Unknown Mortal Orchestra	Unknown Mortal Orchestra		Fat Possum, True Panther	
June 21	"Weird Al" Yankovic	Alpocalypse	Comedy, parody	Volcano, Jive, Way Moby	
June 22	Yes	Fly from Here	Progressive rock	Frontiers	
June 23	Draconian	A Rose for the Apocalypse	Gothic metal, doom metal, death-doom	Napalm	
June 24	Beyoncé	4	R&B	Parkwood, Columbia	
June 24	Sepultura	Kairos	Groove metal, thrash metal, death metal	Nuclear Blast	
June 27	John Maus	We Must Become the Pitiless Censors of Ourselves	Lo-fi, synth-pop	Ribbon Music, Upset the Rhythm	
June 28	Big Sean	Finally Famous	Hip-hop	GOOD Music, Def Jam	
June 28	David Cook	This Loud Morning	Rock, alternative rock, pop rock	RCA, 19	
June 28	Dolly Parton	Better Day	Country	Warner Music Nashville	
June 28	Falling Up	Your Sparkling Death Cometh	Experimental rock, Christian rock	Falling Up	
June 28	Gillian Welch	The Harrow & the Harvest	Folk	Acony Records	
June 28	Handsome Furs	Sound Kapital	Electropunk	Sub Pop	
June 28	Limp Bizkit	Gold Cobra	Nu metal, rap metal	Flip, Interscope	
June 28	Rival Sons	Pressure & Time	Blues rock, hard rock	Earache	
June 28	Shabazz Palaces	Black Up	Experimental hip-hop	Sub Pop	
June 28	Son Lux	We Are Rising	Post-rock	Anticon	
June 28	Taking Back Sunday	Taking Back Sunday	Rock	Sire, Warner Bros.	
June 28	There for Tomorrow	The Verge	Alternative rock, emo	Hopeless	
June 29	Lil B	I'm Gay (I'm Happy)	Hip-hop	Amalgam Digital	

== Third quarter ==
=== July ===
List of albums released in July 2011
Go to: January | February | March | April | May | June | July | August | September | October | November | December | Back to top
Release date	Artist	Album	Genre	Label	Ref.
July 2	Kendrick Lamar	Section.80	Conscious hip-hop	Top Dawg	
July 4	Brian Eno	Drums Between the Bells	Electronic, experimental, ambient	Warp	
July 4	Earth Crisis	Neutralize the Threat		Century Media	
July 4	Mallory Knox	Pilot	Alternative rock, post-hardcore	A Wolf at Your Door Records	
July 5	Basement	I Wish I Could Stay Here	Emo, post-hardcore, pop-punk	Run for Cover	
July 5	Exhumed	All Guts, No Glory	Death metal	Relapse	
July 5	Hands	Give Me Rest	Christian metal, metalcore, progressive metal	Facedown	
July 5	Hyuna	Bubble Pop!	K-pop	Cube	
July 5	Unearth	Darkness in the Light	Metalcore	Metal Blade	
July 6	Colbie Caillat	All of You	Pop, pop rock, folk pop	Universal Republic	
July 8	Alex Clare	The Lateness of the Hour	Drum and bass, electronica, electronic rock	Island	
July 8	Twenty One Pilots	Regional at Best			
July 11	Fair to Midland	Arrows and Anchors	Alternative metal, progressive rock	E1 Music	
July 11	Gazelle Twin	The Entire City	Electronic, art pop	Anti-Ghost Moon Ray Records	
July 11	The Horrors	Skying	Neo-psychedelia, shoegaze, post-punk	XL	
July 11	Prurient	Bermuda Drain	Electro-industrial, darkwave	Hydra Head	
July 11	Zomby	Dedication	Electronic	4AD	
July 12	Blake Shelton	Red River Blue	Country	Warner Bros. Nashville	
July 12	Breathe Carolina	Hell Is What You Make It	Electronicore, electropop, trance	Fearless	
July 12	Chris Young	Neon	Neotraditional country	RCA Nashville	
July 12	David Bromberg	Use Me	Folk rock, blues	Appleseed	
July 12	Decapitated	Carnival Is Forever	Technical death metal, groove metal	Nuclear Blast, Mystic Production, Nippon Columbia	
July 12	Eleanor Friedberger	Last Summer	Indie pop	Merge	
July 12	Incubus	If Not Now, When?	Soft rock, alternative rock	Epic, Immortal	
July 12	Sublime with Rome	Yours Truly	Ska, reggae, alternative rock	Fueled by Ramen	
July 12	Suicide Silence	The Black Crown	Deathcore, nu metal	Century Media	
July 12	Theory of a Deadman	The Truth Is...	Hard rock	604, Roadrunner	
July 13	Lil Wayne	Sorry 4 the Wait	Hip-hop	Young Money, Cash Money	
July 18	Miss A	A Class	K-pop, dance-pop	JYP	
July 19	3 Doors Down	Time of My Life	Alternative rock, hard rock	Universal Republic	
July 19	311	Universal Pulse	Reggae rock	ATO	
July 19	The Dangerous Summer	War Paint	Alternative rock, emo pop	Hopeless	
July 19	Portugal. The Man	In the Mountain in the Cloud	Psychedelic rock, progressive rock, glam rock	Atlantic	
July 19	Sole and the Skyrider Band	Hello Cruel World	Hip-hop	Fake Four Inc.	
July 19	The Summer Set	Everything's Fine	Emo pop, pop, pop-punk	Razor & Tie	
July 19	Terri Lyne Carrington	The Mosaic Project	R&B, jazz	Concord Jazz	
July 19	They Might Be Giants	Join Us	Indie pop	Idlewild	
July 20	Fountains of Wayne	Sky Full of Holes	Alternative rock, power pop	Yep Roc, Lojinx, Warner Music	
July 21	Joss Stone	LP1	Blues, soul, R&B	Stone'd, Surfdog	
July 21	Little Dragon	Ritual Union	Synth-pop, trip hop, downtempo	Peacefrog	
July 22	Ivi Adamou	San Ena Oniro	Pop, dance-pop	Sony Music Greece, Day 1	
July 22	Kelly Rowland	Here I Am	Pop, dance-pop, R&B	Universal Motown	
July 25	Wolf Gang	Suego Faults	Pop	Atlantic, Elektra	
July 26	All Shall Perish	This Is Where It Ends	Deathcore, metalcore, melodic death metal	Nuclear Blast	
July 26	Bomb the Music Industry!	Vacation	Pop-punk, indie rock, power pop	Quote Unquote, Ernest Jenning, Really Records	
July 26	Falling in Reverse	The Drug in Me Is You	Post-hardcore, emo, pop-punk	Epitaph	
July 26	The Features	Wilderness	Indie rock, new wave	Bug Music, Serpents and Snakes	
July 26	Karmakanic	In a Perfect World		Inside Out	
July 26	Vanessa Carlton	Rabbits on the Run	Pop, indie pop	Razor & Tie	
July 27	B'z	C'mon	Hard rock, pop rock	Vermillion	

=== August ===
List of albums released in August 2011
Go to: January | February | March | April | May | June | July | August | September | October | November | December | Back to top
Release date	Artist	Album	Genre	Label	Ref.
August 2	The Decemberists	iTunes Session	Indie folk		
August 2	Dir En Grey	Dum Spiro Spero	Avant-garde metal, progressive metal, death metal	The End	
August 2	The Ettes	Wicked Will		Sympathy for the Record Industry	
August 2	Greyson Chance	Hold On 'til the Night	Pop rock	eleveneleven, Maverick, Geffen	
August 2	Moonface	Organ Music Not Vibraphone Like I'd Hoped	Indie rock	Jagjaguwar	
August 2	Serengeti	Family & Friends	Hip-hop	Anticon	
August 2	Trace Adkins	Proud to Be Here	Country	Show Dog-Universal Music	
August 2	Trivium	In Waves	Heavy metal, metalcore	Roadrunner	
August 5	Boy & Bear	Moonfire	Indie rock, indie folk	Island Records Australia, Universal Motown Republic	
August 6	Full of Hell	Roots of Earth Are Consuming My Home	Grindcore, powerviolence, noise	A389 Records	
August 7	Total Control	Henge Beat	Post-punk, new wave, indie rock	Iron Lung Records	
August 8	Fionn Regan	100 Acres of Sycamore	Folk	Heavenly	
August 8	Jay-Z & Kanye West	Watch the Throne	Hip-hop	Roc-A-Fella, Roc Nation, Def Jam	
August 8	Mary-Jess Leaverland	Shine	Pop, classical crossover	Decca	
August 8	Peatbog Faeries	Dust	Celtic fusion, world fusion, experimental	Peatbog Records	
August 9	Ace Hood	Blood, Sweat & Tears	Hip-hop	We the Best, Def Jam	
August 9	Royce da 5'9"	Success Is Certain	Hip-hop	Gracie Productions, Orchard	
August 9	Shlohmo	Bad Vibes	Electronic	Friends of Friends	
August 15	Baxter Dury	Happy Soup	Indie pop	Regal	
August 15	Danny Brown	XXX	Alternative hip-hop	Fool's Gold	
August 15	Thee Faction	Up The Workers! or, Capitalism is Good For Corporations That's Why You've Been Told Socialism is Bad All Your Life		Soviet Beret	
August 16	Ana Popović	Unconditional	Blues, blues rock, soul blues	Eclecto Groove Records	
August 16	Blue October	Any Man in America	Alternative rock, post-grunge, progressive rock	RED, Megaforce, earMUSIC	
August 16	Chimaira	The Age of Hell	Groove metal	E1 Music	
August 16	Eli Young Band	Life at Best	Country	Republic Nashville	
August 16	Maria Taylor	Overlook	Folk rock	Saddle Creek	
August 16	The War on Drugs	Slave Ambient	Indie rock, indie folk, neo-psychedelia	Secretly Canadian	
August 16	Yellow Ostrich	The Mistress		Barsuk	
August 17	Kyary Pamyu Pamyu	Moshi Moshi Harajuku	J-pop, electropop	Unborde	
August 18	The Weeknd	Thursday	Alternative R&B	XO	
August 19	Frenzal Rhomb	Smoko at the Pet Food Factory	Punk rock	Shock, Fat Wreck Chords	
August 19	Ghost Brigade	Until Fear No Longer Defines Us	Melodic death metal, doom metal	Season of Mist	
August 19	Gotye	Making Mirrors	Indie rock, indie pop	Eleven	
August 19	Hard-Fi	Killer Sounds	Indie rock, alternative rock	Necessary, Warner Music	
August 19	Joe McElderry	Classic	Classical, pop	Decca	
August 19	Pugwash	The Olympus Sound	Chamber pop, power pop	1969 Records, EMI, Lojinx	
August 22	CSS	La Liberación		Cooperative Music	
August 23	Apathy	Honkey Kong	Hip-hop	Dirty Version Records	
August 23	Barbra Streisand	What Matters Most	Traditional pop	Columbia	
August 23	Black Tide	Post Mortem	Heavy metal, metalcore	Interscope	
August 23	The Cab	Symphony Soldier			
August 23	Various artists	Muppets: The Green Album	Pop rock, alternative rock, indie rock	Walt Disney	
August 26	Edguy	Age of the Joker	Power metal, hard rock	Nuclear Blast	
August 26	David Guetta	Nothing but the Beat	Electropop	Virgin, EMI	
August 26	Red Hot Chili Peppers	I'm with You	Funk rock, alternative rock	Warner Bros.	
August 29	Kimbra	Vows	Art pop	Warner Bros.	
August 29	Lenny Kravitz	Black and White America	Funk rock	Roadrunner, Loud & Proud	
August 29	Lil Wayne	Tha Carter IV	Hip-hop	Young Money, Cash Money, Universal Republic	
August 29	The Nightwatchman	World Wide Rebel Songs	Folk rock, anti-folk, folk punk	New West	
August 29	Thundercat	The Golden Age of Apocalypse	Jazz fusion, electronic, R&B	Brainfeeder	
August 29	Tinariwen	Tassili	African blues, world	Anti-	
August 30	Alias	Fever Dream	Instrumental hip-hop	Anticon	
August 30	Beirut	The Rip Tide	Indie pop, Balkan folk	Pompeii	
August 30	Blood Orange	Coastal Grooves	New wave, indie pop, funk	Domino	
August 30	Cymbals Eat Guitars	Lenses Alien	Indie rock	Memphis Industries, Barsuk	
August 30	Jake Owen	Barefoot Blue Jean Night	Country	RCA Nashville	
August 30	Jill Scott	The Original Jill Scott from the Vault, Vol. 1	R&B, neo soul	Hidden Beach	
August 30	Juliana Hatfield	There's Always Another Girl	Indie rock	Ye Olde Records	
August 30	Kittie	I've Failed You	Death metal, heavy metal	EOne	
August 30	Mike Doughty	Yes and Also Yes	Rock	SNACK BAR Records	
August 30	The Red Jumpsuit Apparatus	Am I the Enemy	Post-hardcore, alternative rock	Collective Sounds, RED Distribution	
August 30	Ry Cooder	Pull Up Some Dust and Sit Down	Americana, American roots	Nonesuch	
August 31	Ayumi Hamasaki	Five	Pop, R&B, pop rock	Avex Trax	
August 31	Dev	The Night the Sun Came Up	Electropop, dance-pop	Universal Republic	
August 31	The-Dream	1977	R&B	Radio Killa	

=== September ===
List of albums released in September 2011
Go to: January | February | March | April | May | June | July | August | September | October | November | December | Back to top
Release date	Artist	Album	Genre	Label	Ref.
September 2	Jonathan Coulton	Artificial Heart	Folk rock, alternative rock, indie folk	Jocoserious Records	
September 2	Melanie C	The Sea	Pop	Red Girl Records, Warner	
September 4	The Selecter	Made in Britain	Ska, two-tone	Vocaphone Records	
September 5	The Field	Looping State of Mind	Ambient techno, minimal techno	Kompakt	
September 5	Grouplove	Never Trust a Happy Song	Alternative rock, indie pop	Canvasback, Atlantic	
September 6	Belanova	Sueño Electro II	Pop		
September 6	George Strait	Here for a Good Time	Neotraditional country	MCA Nashville	
September 6	Lindsey Buckingham	Seeds We Sow	Rock	Mind Kit Records, Eagle Rock, Back On Black	
September 6	Thrice	Major/Minor	Experimental rock, alternative rock, post-hardcore	Vagrant	
September 7	Girls	Father, Son, Holy Ghost	Indie rock	True Panther Sounds	
September 7	Neon Indian	Era Extraña	Chillwave, indietronica	Static Tongues, Mom + Pop	
September 9	Ball Park Music	Happiness and Surrounding Suburbs		Stop Start, EMI Australia	
September 9	Ed Sheeran	+	Folk-pop	Asylum, Atlantic	
September 9	Howling Bells	The Loudest Engine	Indie rock	Cooking Vinyl	
September 9	Laura Marling	A Creature I Don't Know	Folk	Virgin	
September 11	Mikal Cronin	Mikal Cronin	Garage rock, psychedelic pop, power pop	Trouble in Mind	
September 12	Anthrax	Worship Music	Thrash metal, groove metal	Megaforce, Nuclear Blast	
September 12	Dream Theater	A Dramatic Turn of Events	Progressive metal, progressive rock	Roadrunner	
September 12	Ladytron	Gravity the Seducer	Synth-pop, baroque pop	Nettwerk	
September 12	Primus	Green Naugahyde	Funk rock, experimental rock	ATO, Prawn Song	
September 12	Slow Club	Paradise	Folk, indie pop	Moshi Moshi	
September 12	Suspekt	Elektra	Hip-hop, horrorcore, classical	Universal, Tabu Records	
September 13	Alice Cooper	Welcome 2 My Nightmare	Hard rock	Universal	
September 13	Astronautalis	This Is Our Science	Hip-hop	Fake Four Inc.	
September 13	Blitzen Trapper	American Goldwing	Alternative country	Sub Pop	
September 13	Bush	The Sea of Memories	Alternative rock, post-grunge	Zuma Rock, eOne, earMUSIC	
September 13	Das Racist	Relax	Hip-hop	Greedhead Music	
September 13	The Devil Wears Prada	Dead Throne	Metalcore	Ferret Music, Roadrunner	
September 13	The Drums	Portamento	Indie pop, new wave, post-punk revival	Moshi Moshi, Island	
September 13	Jonathan Wilson	Gentle Spirit	Folk, psychedelic	Bella Union	
September 13	Kevin Devine	Between the Concrete and Clouds		Razor & Tie, Favorite Gentlemen Recording, Big Scary Monsters	
September 13	Madina Lake	World War III	Post-hardcore, alternative rock	Razor & Tie	
September 13	Mates of State	Mountaintops	Indie pop	Barsuk	
September 13	Nick Lowe	The Old Magic	Soft rock	Proper, Yep Roc	
September 13	Opeth	Heritage	Progressive rock	Roadrunner	
September 13	The Pack A.D.	Unpersons	Garage rock	Mint	
September 13	Polar Bear Club	Clash Battle Guilt Pride	Post-hardcore, punk rock, emo	Bridge Nine	
September 13	Saves the Day	Daybreak	Alternative rock, punk rock, emo	Razor & Tie	
September 13	St. Vincent	Strange Mercy	Art pop, baroque pop	4AD	
September 13	Staind	Staind	Alternative metal, nu metal	Atlantic, Roadrunner, Flip	
September 13	We Came as Romans	Understanding What We've Grown to Be	Metalcore, post-hardcore	Equal Vision, Nuclear Blast	
September 13	Wild Flag	Wild Flag	Rock, post-punk	Merge	
September 13	Wolves in the Throne Room	Celestial Lineage	Post-black metal	Southern Lord	
September 14	Loudness	Eve to Dawn	Heavy metal, progressive metal	Tokuma Japan	
September 16	Kasabian	Velociraptor!	Electronic rock, electronica, neo-psychedelia	RCA	
September 16	SuperHeavy	SuperHeavy		A&M	
September 16	Tori Amos	Night of Hunters	Classical crossover	Deutsche Grammophon	
September 17	Deus	Keep You Close	Indie rock	Universal	
September 17	Kjersti Stubø Quartet	How High Is the Sky	Jazz	Bolage Records	
September 19	Inna	I Am the Club Rocker	Europop, dance-pop, techno	Roton Music	
September 19	Mel Parsons	Red Grey Blue	Alternative country, indie folk	Cape Road Recordings, Border Music	
September 19	Scroobius Pip	Distraction Pieces	Hip-hop, spoken word, rap rock	Speech Development, Strange Famous	
September 19	The Waterboys	An Appointment with Mr Yeats		Puck Records	
September 20	Brad Mehldau and Kevin Hays	Modern Music	Classical, avante-garde	Nonesuch	
September 20	Clap Your Hands Say Yeah	Hysterical	Indie rock		
September 20	Demi Lovato	Unbroken	Pop, R&B	Hollywood	
September 20	Gavin DeGraw	Sweeter	Pop rock, blue-eyed soul	RCA	
September 20	Needtobreathe	The Reckoning	Alternative rock, Christian rock, Southern rock	Atlantic	
September 20	Of Monsters and Men	My Head Is an Animal	Indie folk, indie pop, indie rock	Record Records, Republic	
September 20	Veronica Falls	Veronica Falls		Slumberland, Bella Union	
September 20	Wavves	Life Sux		Ghost Ramp	
September 21	Dead by April	Incomparable	Alternative metal, melodic metalcore	Universal, Spinefarm	
September 21	Sebastian Bach	Kicking & Screaming	Heavy metal	Frontiers, Get Off My Bach! Productions, Avalon Records	
September 23	Amebix	Sonic Mass	Crust punk, heavy metal, post-metal	Amebix Records	
September 23	Fit for a King	Descendants	Metalcore		
September 23	Hatesphere	The Great Bludgeoning	Thrash metal, melodic death metal	Napalm	
September 23	Kasey Chambers	Storybook	Country	Liberation Music	
September 23	Machine Head	Unto the Locust	Thrash metal, groove metal	Roadrunner	
September 23	Nicola Roberts	Cinderella's Eyes	Indie pop, electropop, dance-pop	Polydor	
September 23	Ricardo Arjona	Independiente	Latin pop, rock	Metamorfosis, Warner Music	
September 26	Brett Anderson	Black Rainbows	Indie rock	BA Songs	
September 26	Death in Vegas	Trans-Love Energies	Electronica	Portobello Records	
September 26	Steve Hackett	Beyond the Shrouded Horizon	Progressive rock	Inside Out, Century Media	
September 26	Steven Wilson	Grace for Drowning	Progressive rock, experimental rock, jazz fusion	Kscope	
September 26	Zola Jesus	Conatus	Art pop, synth-pop, electronic	Sacred Bones	
September 27	9th Wonder	The Wonder Years	Underground hip-hop	It's a Wonderful World	
September 27	Apparat	The Devil's Walk	Electronic	Mute	
September 27	The Bangles	Sweetheart of the Sun	Pop rock	Model Music Group	
September 27	Bearfoot	American Story	Bluegrass, Americana	Compass	
September 27	Blink-182	Neighborhoods	Alternative rock, pop-punk	DGC, Interscope	
September 27	Chickenfoot	Chickenfoot III	Hard rock, heavy metal, blues rock	eOne Music	
September 27	Christian McBride Big Band	The Good Feeling	Jazz	Mack Avenue	
September 27	Dum Dum Girls	Only in Dreams		Sub Pop	
September 27	J. Cole	Cole World: The Sideline Story	Hip-hop	Roc Nation, Columbia, Sony Music	
September 27	Jim Cuddy	Skyscraper Soul	Country rock	5 Corners Productions	
September 27	LeAnn Rimes	Lady & Gentlemen	Country	Curb	
September 27	Mastodon	The Hunter	Heavy metal, stoner metal	Reprise, Roadrunner	
September 27	The Mekons	Ancient & Modern 1911–2011	Folk rock	Bloodshot	
September 27	Poncho Sanchez and Terence Blanchard	Chano y Dizzy!	Latin jazz	Concord	
September 27	Seth MacFarlane	Music Is Better Than Words	Swing, big band, vocal jazz	Universal Republic	
September 27	Switchfoot	Vice Verses	Alternative rock, post-grunge, hard rock	lowercase people, Atlantic	
September 27	Van Hunt	What Were You Hoping For?	Psychedelic soul, rock	Godless Hotspot, Thirty Tigers	
September 27	Wilco	The Whole Love	Art rock, indie rock	dBpm	
September 27	Youth Lagoon	The Year of Hibernation	Dream pop, lo-fi, neo-psychedelia	Fat Possum	
September 30	Ben Howard	Every Kingdom	Folk, indie folk	Island	
September 30	DJ Shadow	The Less You Know, the Better	Hip-hop, instrumental hip-hop, trip hop	Island	
September 30	DRC Music	Kinshasa One Two		Warp, Oxfam	
September 30	Feist	Metals		Arts & Crafts, Cherrytree, Polydor	
September 30	Meat Loaf	Hell in a Handbasket	Hard rock, heavy metal	Legacy	
September 30	Modeselektor	Monkeytown	IDM	Monkeytown	
September 30	New Found Glory	Radiosurgery	Pop-punk	Epitaph	

== Fourth quarter ==
=== October ===
List of albums released in October 2011
Go to: January | February | March | April | May | June | July | August | September | October | November | December | Back to top
Release date	Artist	Album	Genre	Label	Ref.
October 2	Julian Lennon	Everything Changes	Rock	Conehead	
October 3	The Answer	Revival	Hard rock, blues rock	Spinefarm	
October 3	Aqua	Megalomania	Dance-pop	Universal	
October 3	Emika	Emika	Electronic, dubstep, trip hop	Ninja Tune	
October 3	Erasure	Tomorrow's World	Synth-pop	Mute	
October 3	Paul McCartney	Ocean's Kingdom	Contemporary classical	Decca, Hear Music/Telarc	
October 3	Roots Manuva	4everevolution	Hip-hop	Big Dada	
October 3	The Union	Siren's Song	Rock, hard rock, blues rock	Payola Records	
October 3	You Me at Six	Sinners Never Sleep	Alternative rock, pop rock	Virgin	
October 4	Blessthefall	Awakening	Metalcore, post-hardcore	Fearless	
October 4	Bonnie "Prince" Billy	Wolfroy Goes to Town	Americana, alternative country, folk	Drag City	
October 4	Exile	4TRK Mind	Underground hip-hop	Soulspazm	
October 4	Jack's Mannequin	People and Things	Alternative rock	Sire	
October 4	Lights	Siberia	Synth-pop, new wave, dubstep	Last Gang, Lights Music, Universal	
October 4	Mayday Parade	Mayday Parade	Pop-punk, pop rock, emo	ILG, Fearless, MDP	
October 4	Misfits	The Devil's Rain	Heavy metal, horror punk	Misfits	
October 4	Mutemath	Odd Soul	Alternative rock, psychedelic soul	Teleprompt, Warner Bros.	
October 4	Radical Face	The Family Tree: The Roots			
October 4	Rodney Atkins	Take a Back Road	Country	Curb	
October 4	Scotty McCreery	Clear as Day	Country	Mercury Nashville, 19	
October 4	Styles P	Master of Ceremonies	Hip-hop	D-Block Records, E1 Music	
October 4	Various artists	The Lost Notebooks of Hank Williams	Country	Columbia, Third Man	
October 4	Wayne Static	Pighammer	Industrial metal	Dirthouse Records	
October 4	We Were Promised Jetpacks	In the Pit of the Stomach	Indie rock, post-punk revival	FatCat	
October 5	Björk	Biophilia	Electronic, experimental	One Little Indian	
October 5	Charice	Infinity	Pop, R&B	Warner Bros.	
October 5	The Gazette	Toxic	Nu metal, alternative metal, metalcore	Sony Music	
October 5	One Ok Rock	Zankyo Reference	Alternative rock, power pop, post-hardcore	A-Sketch	
October 7	Big Scary	Vacation	Pop rock		
October 7	Evanescence	Evanescence	Symphonic metal, gothic rock, nu metal	Wind-up	
October 10	Martyn	Ghost People	Electronic	Brainfeeder	
October 10	Of the Wand & the Moon	The Lone Descent	Neofolk	Heiðrunar Myrkrunar	
October 10	Peter Gabriel	New Blood		Real World, Virgin	
October 10	Rustie	Glass Swords	Electronic	Warp	
October 10	Ryan Adams	Ashes & Fire	Alternative country	PAX AM, Capitol	
October 10	Tim Hecker	Dropped Pianos	Ambient, experimental	Kranky	
October 11	Andrew Cyrille	Route de Frères	Jazz, world	Tum Records	
October 11	Lauren Alaina	Wildflower	Country	Mercury Nashville, Interscope, 19	
October 11	A Lot Like Birds	Conversation Piece		Doghouse	
October 11	Electric Six	Heartbeats and Brainwaves		Metropolis	
October 11	Five Finger Death Punch	American Capitalist	Groove metal, alternative metal, hard rock	Prospect Park	
October 11	Martina McBride	Eleven	Country	Republic Nashville	
October 11	Murs and Ski Beatz	Love & Rockets Vol. 1: The Transformation	Alternative hip-hop	BluRoc	
October 11	Radio Moscow	The Great Escape of Leslie Magnafuzz		Alive Naturalsound	
October 11	Rich Robinson	Through a Crooked Sun	Blues rock, hard rock	Circle Sound, Thirty Tigers	
October 11	Various artists	ZZ Top: A Tribute from Friends	Rock	RCA	
October 11	William Shatner	Seeking Major Tom	Rock, spoken word	Cleopatra	
October 13	Anoushka Shankar	Traveller	Flamenco	Deutsche Grammophon	
October 14	Kerser	The Nebulizer		Obese	
October 14	Matt Cardle	Letters	Pop rock	Syco, Sony, Columbia	
October 17	Cowboy Junkies	Sing in My Meadow	Alternative country	Latent	
October 17	Iced Earth	Dystopia	Power metal, heavy metal, thrash metal	Century Media	
October 17	Noel Gallagher's High Flying Birds	Noel Gallagher's High Flying Birds	Alternative rock	Sour Mash	
October 17	Yann Tiersen	Skyline	Folk rock, acoustic, indie rock	Mute	
October 18	Casting Crowns	Come to the Well	Pop rock, rock, worship	Beach Street, Reunion	
October 18	Chris Isaak	Beyond the Sun	Rockabilly	Vanguard	
October 18	The City Harmonic	I Have a Dream (It Feels Like Home)	Christian rock, contemporary worship, indie rock	Kingsway Music	
October 18	Freestyle Fellowship	The Promise	Hip-hop	Decon	
October 18	Jane's Addiction	The Great Escape Artist	Art rock, hard rock	Capitol	
October 18	M83	Hurry Up, We're Dreaming	Electronic rock, synth-pop, ambient	Naïve	
October 18	Montgomery Gentry	Rebels on the Run	Country	Average Joes	
October 18	Patrick Stump	Soul Punk	Soul, R&B, synth-pop	Island	
October 18	Psychic Ills	Hazed Dream		Sacred Bones	
October 19	Coldplay	Mylo Xyloto	Alternative rock, pop rock	Parlophone, Capitol	
October 21	Kelly Clarkson	Stronger	Pop rock	RCA, 19	
October 21	King Gizzard & the Lizard Wizard	Willoughby's Beach	Garage rock, noise rock	King Gizzard & the Lizard Wizard	
October 21	Riot V	Immortal Soul	Heavy metal, power metal, speed metal	Marquee/Avalon, SPV/Steamhammer	
October 21	Tom Waits	Bad as Me	Experimental rock, blues	Anti-	
October 24	Buraka Som Sistema	Komba		Enchufada	
October 24	Deer Tick	Divine Providence	Indie rock, alternative country	Partisan	
October 24	Justice	Audio, Video, Disco	Electronic, electronic rock	Ed Banger, Because Music	
October 24	She & Him	A Very She & Him Christmas	Indie pop, Christmas	Merge	
October 24	Yo-Yo Ma, Stuart Duncan, Edgar Meyer & Chris Thile	The Goat Rodeo Sessions	Bluegrass, classical	Sony Masterworks	
October 25	Aiden	Some Kind of Hate	Horror punk, melodic hardcore	Victory, Riot!	
October 25	Black Tusk	Set the Dial	Sludge metal, hardcore punk, stoner metal	Relapse	
October 25	honeyhoney	Billy Jack	Americana, indie rock, country	honeyhoney Records, Lost Highway	
October 25	James Ferraro	Far Side Virtual	Vaporwave, muzak, avant-garde	Hippos in Tanks	
October 25	Jedi Mind Tricks	Violence Begets Violence	Hip-hop	Enemy Soil	
October 25	Kathryn Calder	Bright and Vivid	Folk-pop, indie pop	File Under: Music	
October 25	Prurient	Time's Arrow	Industrial, noise	Hydra Head	
October 25	Russian Circles	Empros	Post-metal	Sargent House	
October 25	Skinny Puppy	HanDover	Electro-industrial, noise, glitch	SPV GmbH	
October 25	Statik Selektah	Population Control	Hip-hop	Showoff Records, Duck Down Music	
October 25	Surfer Blood	Tarot Classics	Indie rock	Kanine	
October 25	Toby Keith	Clancy's Tavern	Country	Show Dog-Universal Music	
October 25	Vince Gill	Guitar Slinger	Country	MCA Nashville	
October 26	Various artists	AHK-toong BAY-bi Covered	Rock	Mercury, Interscope, Universal	
October 27	Megadeth	Th1rt3en	Thrash metal	Roadrunner	
October 28	Florence and the Machine	Ceremonials	Baroque pop, art pop, indie pop	Island	
October 28	Gugun Blues Shelter	Solid Ground	Blues rock	Grooveyard Records	
October 28	Professor Green	At Your Inconvenience	British hip-hop, UK garage, R&B	Virgin	
October 31	ASAP Rocky	Live. Love. ASAP	Hip-hop	Polo Grounds, RCA	
October 31	Lou Reed and Metallica	Lulu	Avant-garde metal	Warner Bros., Vertigo	

=== November ===
List of albums released in November 2011
Go to: January | February | March | April | May | June | July | August | September | October | November | December | Back to top
Release date	Artist	Album	Genre	Label	Ref.
November 1	Black Milk and Danny Brown	Black and Brown!	Alternative hip-hop	Fat Beats Records	
November 1	Carole King	A Holiday Carole	Pop, Holiday	Hear Music, Concord	
November 1	Justin Bieber	Under the Mistletoe	Christmas	Island	
November 1	Miranda Lambert	Four the Record	Country, alternative country	RCA Nashville	
November 1	Phantogram	Nightlife	Electronic rock, indie pop, trip hop	Barsuk	
November 1	Wale	Ambition	Hip-hop	Maybach Music, Allido, Warner Bros.	
November 2	Cast	Troubled Times	Rock	Cast Recordings	
November 4	Birdy	Birdy	Indie folk, indie pop, indie rock	14th Floor, Atlantic	
November 4	Cher Lloyd	Sticks and Stones	Pop, dubstep, hip-hop	Syco, Epic, Sony Music	
November 4	The Wanted	Battleground	Dance-pop	Island	
November 7	Atlas Sound	Parallax	Pop, dream pop	4AD	
November 7	Cœur de pirate	Blonde	Pop	Grosse Boîte	
November 7	David Lynch	Crazy Clown Time	Blues, electropop, avant-garde	PIAS, Sunday Best	
November 7	Sigur Rós	Inni	Post-rock, ambient		
November 7	The Sound of Arrows	Voyage	Synth-pop	Skies Above Records	
November 8	Cass McCombs	Humor Risk	Indie folk, indie rock	Domino	
November 8	Christian McBride	Conversations with Christian	Jazz	Mack Avenue	
November 8	Joe Nichols	It's All Good	Country	Show Dog-Universal Music	
November 8	Like Moths to Flames	When We Don't Exist	Metalcore, post-hardcore	Rise	
November 8	Mac Miller	Blue Slide Park	Hip-hop	Rostrum	
November 8	Oneohtrix Point Never	Replica	Ambient, plunderphonics	Mexican Summer, Software	
November 8	Thee Oh Sees	Carrion Crawler/The Dream	Garage rock, psychedelic rock, krautrock	In the Red	
November 8	Pusha T	Fear of God II: Let Us Pray	Hip-hop	GOOD Music, Decon, Re-Up Records	
November 8	Quilt	Quilt	Indie folk, psychedelic folk	Mexican Summer	
November 8	Tycho	Dive	Chillwave, downtempo, chill-out	Ghostly International	
November 8	Various artists	The Twilight Saga: Breaking Dawn – Part 1 soundtrack	Alternative rock, indie rock, pop	Atlantic	
November 9	Elephant9	Live at the BBC	Progressive rock	Rune Grammofon	
November 11	Angels & Airwaves	Love: Part Two	Alternative rock, space rock	To the Stars Records	
November 11	The Checks	Deadly Summer Sway		Pie Club Records	
November 11	Laura Pausini	Inedito	Latin pop	Atlantic, Warner Music	
November 11	Mr. Oizo	Stade 2	Electronic, avant-garde	Ed Banger	
November 11	Nina Hagen	Volksbeat	Punk, rock	Koch	
November 11	Northlane	Discoveries	Metalcore, progressive metal	UNFD, Distort	
November 11	Pixie Lott	Young Foolish Happy	Pop, R&B	Mercury	
November 11	Snow Patrol	Fallen Empires		Fiction, Island	
November 14	Los Campesinos!	Hello Sadness	Indie pop, indie rock	Wichita, Arts & Crafts	
November 14	The Fall	Ersatz GB	Alternative rock	Cherry Red	
November 15	Bryan Webb	Provider		Idée Fixe	
November 15	Childish Gambino	Camp	Hip-hop	Glassnote	
November 15	Drake	Take Care	Hip-hop, R&B, pop	Young Money, Cash Money, Republic	
November 15	Eligh and Amp Live	Therapy at 3	Alternative hip-hop	Legendary Music, Live Up	
November 15	Gym Class Heroes	The Papercut Chronicles II	Pop rap, alternative hip-hop, rap rock	Warner Bros., Decaydance, Fueled by Ramen	
November 16	Pinch and Shackleton	Pinch & Shackleton	Dubstep, techno	Honest Jon's	
November 18	One Direction	Up All Night	Pop	Syco, Columbia	
November 18	Rihanna	Talk That Talk	Pop, dance, R&B	Def Jam	
November 21	Big Time Rush	Elevate	Pop, dance-pop	Nickelodeon, Columbia	
November 21	Chris Cornell	Songbook	Acoustic, alternative rock	Universal	
November 21	Daughtry	Break the Spell	Post-grunge	RCA, 19	
November 21	Hollywood Undead	American Tragedy Redux	Rap rock, dubstep, electronica	A&M Octone, Polydor, Universal Music Australia	
November 21	James Durbin	Memories of a Beautiful Disaster	Rock	Wind-up	
November 21	Kate Bush	50 Words for Snow	Art pop, chamber pop	Fish People	
November 21	MadGibbs	Thuggin'	Hip-hop, jazz	Madlib Invazion	
November 21	Marianas Trench	Ever After	Pop-punk, symphonic rock	604	
November 21	Mary J. Blige	My Life II... The Journey Continues (Act 1)	R&B, hip-hop soul	Matriarch Records, Geffen	
November 21	Mobb Deep	Black Cocaine	Hip-hop	Infamous Records, RED	
November 21	Nickelback	Here and Now	Post-grunge, hard rock, alternative metal	Roadrunner, Universal Music Canada	
November 21	Office of Future Plans	Office of Future Plans	Punk rock	Dischord	
November 21	The Saturdays	On Your Radar	Pop, dance-pop, electropop	Polydor, Fascination	
November 21	Sepalcure	Sepalcure	Future garage, post-dubstep, techno	Hotflush	
November 21	Taylor Swift	Speak Now World Tour – Live	Country pop	Big Machine	
November 21	Willie Nelson	Remember Me, Vol. 1	Country	R&J	
November 21	Yelawolf	Radioactive	Hip-hop	DGC, Interscope, Shady	
November 22	Doomtree	No Kings	Hip-hop	Doomtree	
November 22	Lady Gaga	A Very Gaga Holiday	Jazz pop	Interscope, KonLive	
November 22	Michael W. Smith	Glory	CCM	Reunion	
November 22	M.O.P. and Snowgoons	Sparta	Hardcore hip-hop	Babygrande	
November 25	Joe McElderry	Classic Christmas	Christmas, pop, classical	Decca	
November 25	Olly Murs	In Case You Didn't Know	Pop	Syco, Epic	
November 28	Kylie Minogue	Aphrodite Les Folies – Live in London	Pop	Parlophone	
November 28	The Unthanks	The Songs of Robert Wyatt and Antony & the Johnsons		Rabble Rouser, Rough Trade, High Note Records	
November 29	Hot Chelle Rae	Whatever	Pop rock	RCA	
November 30	Nightwish	Imaginaerum	Symphonic metal	Nuclear Blast, Roadrunner	

=== December ===
List of albums released in December 2011
Go to: January | February | March | April | May | June | July | August | September | October | November | December | Back to top
Release date	Artist	Album	Genre	Label	Ref.
December 2	Bugge Wesseltoft	Songs		Jazzland	
December 2	Taio Cruz	TY.O	Dance-pop, electropop	Island	
December 4	Patrick Wolf	Brumalia EP	Indie pop	Mercury	
December 5	Gallows	Death Is Birth	Hardcore punk	Thirty Days of Night Records, 6131 Records	
December 5	Rebecca Ferguson	Heaven		Syco, RCA, Columbia	
December 6	The Black Keys	El Camino	Garage rock, blues rock	Nonesuch	
December 6	Chevelle	Hats Off to the Bull	Alternative metal, hard rock, post-grunge	Epic	
December 6	Korn	The Path of Totality	Nu metal, dubstep	Roadrunner	
December 6	Robin Thicke	Love After War	R&B, blue-eyed soul	Star Trak, Geffen	
December 6	The Roots	Undun	Alternative hip-hop	Def Jam	
December 6	T-Pain	Revolver	Pop, R&B, electropop	RCA	
December 13	Anthony Hamilton	Back to Love		RCA	
December 13	Charlotte Gainsbourg	Stage Whisper		Because Music, Elektra	
December 13	Snoop Dogg and Wiz Khalifa	Mac & Devin Go to High School	Hip-hop	Atlantic, Rostrum, Doggy Style	
December 19	Common	The Dreamer/The Believer	Hip-hop	Warner Bros., Think Common Music Inc.	
December 20	Guided by Voices	Let's Go Eat the Factory	Indie rock	Fire	
December 20	The Internet	Purple Naked Ladies	Hip-hop soul, R&B, trip hop	Odd Future	
December 20	Skrillex	Bangarang	EDM	Owsla, Big Beat, Atlantic	
December 20	Young Jeezy	TM103 Hustlerz Ambition	Hip-hop	CTE World, Def Jam	
December 21	The Weeknd	Echoes of Silence	Alternative R&B	XO	
