= Shadowboxing (album) =

Studio album by Zion I
- Released: October 2, 2012
- Genre: Hip-hop
- Length: 43:13
- Label: Live Up Records
- Producers: Amp Live; Dex Beats; Traxamillion; Zion I

Zion I chronology
| Atomic Clock (2010) | Shadowboxing (2012) | The Labyrinth (2016) |

Shadowboxing is a studio album by Zion I. It was released by Live Up Records on October 2, 2012. It includes contributions from Collie Buddz, Goapele, The Grouch, Eligh, and Bassnectar. It peaked at number 75 on the Billboard Top R&B/Hip-Hop Albums chart.

== Critical reception ==
Professional ratings
Review scores
| Source | Rating |
|---|---|
| AllMusic | 4/5 stars |
| RapReviews.com | 6.5/10 |

Rick Anderson of AllMusic gave the album 4 out of 5 stars, writing, "One or two tracks hit less hard than the others, but in each of those cases it's because Zion I took a risk and it didn't quite pay off -- and the willingness to take musical risks is one that needs to be encouraged in today's hip-hop world." Meanwhile, Patrick Taylor of RapReviews.com gave the album a 6.5 out of 10, stating that "I wish they would experiment in music that I found less objectionable." Imran Khan of PopMatters wrote, "The album was stripped down to mainly just beats and vocals, revealing the bare essentials of the duo's aestheticism."

== Track listing ==
| No. | Title | Producer(s) | Length |
|---|---|---|---|
| 1. | "ShadowBoxing" | Amp Live | 2:39 |
| 2. | "Human Being" | Amp Live | 3:48 |
| 3. | "Sex Wax" (featuring Collie Buddz) | Amp Live | 2:57 |
| 4. | "Joe Frazzzier" | Amp Live | 6:11 |
| 5. | "Life's Work" (featuring Goapele) | Amp Live | 3:44 |
| 6. | "Anymore" | DexBeats | 3:12 |
| 7. | "Buck Em" | Traxamillion | 3:35 |
| 8. | "Whydaze" | Amp Live & Zumbi | 2:10 |
| 9. | "Rock On" | Amp Live | 3:43 |
| 10. | "Trapped Out" (featuring D.U.S.T.) | Amp Live | 3:49 |
| 11. | "Re-Load" | DexBeats | 4:37 |
| 12. | "We Don't" (featuring The Grouch & Eligh) | Amp Live & Timeline | 3:49 |
| 13. | "Human Being (Bassnectar Edit)" | Amp Live & Bassnectar | 2:25 |

== Charts ==
| Chart | Peak position |
|---|---|
| US Top R&B/Hip-Hop Albums (Billboard) | 75 |
