= Heroes in the City of Dope =

Studio album by Zion I & the Grouch
- Released: October 10, 2006
- Genre: Hip-hop
- Length: 50:49
- Label: Om Records
- Producers: Amp Live, Eligh, Headnodic, The Grouch

Zion I & the Grouch chronology
Heroes in the City of Dope (2006)	Heroes in the Healing of the Nation (2011)

Zion I chronology
Break a Dawn (2006)	Heroes in the City of Dope (2006)	The Takeover (2009)

The Grouch chronology
No More Greener Grasses (2003)	Heroes in the City of Dope (2006)	Show You the World (2008)

Singles from Heroes in the City of Dope
- 1. "Hit 'Em" Released: 2006; 2. "Lift Me Up" Released: 2007

Heroes in the City of Dope is the first collaborative studio album by Zion I and the Grouch. It was released on Om Records on October 10, 2006. It peaked at number 29 on the Billboard Heatseekers Albums chart, as well as number 34 on the Independent Albums chart.

== Critical reception ==
Professional ratings
Review scores
Source	Rating
AllHipHop	3.5/5
AllMusic	3/5 stars
Exclaim!	favorable
MVRemix	8.5/10
Okayplayer	3.5/5 stars
Prefix	7.0/10
RapReviews.com	8/10
SF Weekly	favorable

Kevin Jones of Exclaim! gave the album a favorable review, saying: "With no shortness of inspiration, Zion I and the Grouch ensure that not a minute of this record goes to waste, matching engaging auditory pleasure with words that actually amount to something." Marisa Brown of AllMusic called it "partially introspection, partially consciousness, and partially hyphy-inspired dance music." Eric K. Arnold of East Bay Express wrote: "This collaborative effort presented an alternate view of Bay Area rap, one more concerned with quality-of-life issues than grill-pieces and rims."

== Track listing ==
No.	Title	Producer(s)	Length
1.	"Noon Time"	Amp Live	1:01
2.	"Hit 'Em" (featuring Mistah F.A.B.)	Amp Live	3:37
3.	"Lift Me Up"	Eligh	2:54
4.	"Trains & Planes"	Headnodic	4:19
5.	"Current Affairs"	Amp Live	2:43
6.	"Too Much" (featuring Chali 2na)	Amp Live	3:30
7.	"Faint of Heart"	Amp Live	3:33
8.	"Make U Fly" (featuring Esthero)	Amp Live	3:44
9.	"Smack" (featuring DJ Platurn)	Amp Live	3:37
10.	"Open the Door"	The Grouch	3:19
11.	"Trigger"	Amp Live	3:36
12.	"Digital Dirt"	Amp Live	5:21
13.	"10 Fingers, 10 Toes, 10 lbs, 10 oz" (featuring Deuce Eclipse)	Amp Live	4:24
14.	"Hero"	Amp Live	1:28
15.	"Bad Lands"	Amp Live	3:36

== Personnel ==
Credits adapted from liner notes.

- Zumbi (Zion I) – vocals
- Amp Live (Zion I) – production (except 3, 4, 10)
- The Grouch – vocals, production (10)
- Indela Mass – vocals (1, 11), guitar (1), electric piano (1)
- Mistah F.A.B. – vocals (2)
- John Lucasey – vocals (2)
- Geechi T. – trumpet (2)
- Martin Luther – vocals (3)
- Eligh – production (3)
- Headnodic – production (4), guitar (13), bass guitar (13, 15)
- Jennifer Epp – vocals (5)
- Madame Mangle – vocals (5)
- Chali 2na – vocals (6)
- Kevin Choice – keyboards (7)
- Esthero – vocals (8)
- Errol Cooney – guitar (8)
- Marguerite Ostro – violin (8)
- DJ Platurn – turntables (9)
- Jason Moss – guitar (11), mixing
- Jeremy Miller – guitar (11, 15)
- Brandon Jordan – vocals (11), guitar (11)
- C. Holiday – vocals (12)
- David Goodlett – guitar (12)
- Joe Cohen – saxophone (12)
- Adam Theis – trombone (12)
- Deuce Eclipse – vocals (13)
- Justin Weis – mastering
- Motivate Movement – layout, design
- Paul Beresniewicz – illustration
- Snap Jackson – photography

== Charts ==
Chart	Peak position
US Heatseekers Albums (Billboard)	29
US Independent Albums (Billboard)	34
