= Break a Dawn =

Studio album by Zion I
- Released: June 13, 2006
- Genre: Hip-hop
- Length: 42:52
- Labels: Live Up Records; Handcuts Records
- Producer: Amp Live

Zion I chronology
True & Livin' (2005)	Break a Dawn (2006)	The Takeover (2009)

Singles from Break a Dawn
- 1. "Act Right" / "Target Practice" Released: 2006

Break a Dawn is a studio album by Zion I. It was released by Live Up Records and Handcuts Records in 2006.

Imran Khan of PopMatters wrote, "Break a Dawn traded on the strut of '70s funk, adding some summery spring to the cool, turntablist swings."

== Track listing ==
No.	Title	Length
1.	"Rebel Intro"	0:41
2.	"Act Right" (featuring Ms. Marianna)	2:51
3.	"Target Practice" (featuring Deuce Eclipse and D.U.S.T.)	3:32
4.	"Count It Down" (featuring Raashan Ahmad)	3:42
5.	"My Life"	3:31
6.	"Understanding"	4:16
7.	"Beat Aquariouns"	2:07
8.	"Lets Go"	2:07
9.	"Oxygen"	3:02
10.	"Heavens Gate"	2:23
11.	"One"	3:29
12.	"Live 4 Today"	3:27
13.	"Yes Yes" (featuring Lyrics Born and Gift of Gab)	4:39
14.	"Borderline"	4:15

== Personnel ==
Credits adapted from liner notes.

- Zion (Zion I) – vocals
- Amp Live (Zion I) – production
- Ms. Marianna – vocals (2)
- Mike Tiger – guitar (2, 6), bass guitar (6)
- Headnodic – bass guitar (2, 4), guitar (4), piano (9)
- Deuce Eclipse – vocals (3)
- D.U.S.T. – vocals (3)
- Raashan Ahmad – vocals (4)
- David Boyce – saxophone (5)
- Danny AA – vocals (6)
- Peter De Lion – bass guitar (9)
- Lyrics Born – vocals (13)
- Gift of Gab – vocals (13)
- C. Holiday – vocals (13)
- Cava Menzies – vocals (14), piano (14)
- DJ Worldwise – turntables
- Jason Moss – mixing, mastering
- Kevin Hsieh – cover artwork
- Flavor Innovator – additional artwork, layout, design
- Juliette Ordonia – photography
