= Beautiful Addiction =

Beautiful Addiction may refer to:

- "Beautiful Addiction", a song by Audiovent from Dirty Sexy Knights in Paris
- "Beautiful Addiction, a song by Eligh and Amp Live featuring Grieves and Blake Hazard from Therapy at 3
- "Beautiful Addiction", a song by rapper NF
