= Atomic Clock (disambiguation) =

An atomic clock is a time keeping device.

- Atomic Clock Ensemble in Space science project
- a clock updated by radio signals which is sometimes called an "atomic clock" Radio clock
- the clock as a measure for risk of catastrophic destruction Doomsday Clock
- NIST-F1, the United States' primary time and frequency standard

== Music ==
- Atomic Clock, nickname of Zimmers Hole drummer Gene Hoglan
- Atomic Clock (musician), solo name of The Earlies keyboardist Giles Hatton

=== Albums ===
- Atomic Clock (Zion I album), 2010
- Atomic Clock, an album by Gene Hoglan
- Atomic Clock, an album by Mark Helias, 2006
- The Atomic Clock DVD, by Gene Hoglan

=== Songs ===
- "Atomic Clock", a song by Mark Helias
- "Atomic Clock", a song by Monster Magnet from Powertrip
