= True & Livin' =

Studio album by Zion I
- Released: April 19, 2005
- Genre: Hip-hop
- Length: 59:15
- Label: Live Up Records
- Producer: Amp Live

Zion I chronology
Deep Water Slang V2.0 (2003)	True & Livin' (2005)	Break a Dawn (2006)

Singles from True & Livin
- 1. "Bird's Eye View" Released: 2005; 2. "Temperature" Released: 2005

True & Livin is a studio album by Zion I. It was released by Live Up Records in 2005.

== Critical reception ==
Professional ratings
Review scores
Source	Rating
The A.V. Club	favorable
Blender	3/5 stars
Dusted Magazine	favorable
East Bay Express	favorable
HipHopDX	7.5/10
PopMatters	6/10 stars
Prefix	7/10
RapReviews.com	9/10
Vibe	favorable
XLR8R	favorable

Kabir Hamid of Chicago Reader described the album as "soulful hip-hop that favors acoustic sounds over electronics, thoughtfulness over braggadocio, and spirit-enhancing grooves over testosterone-fueled beats." Rachel Swan of East Bay Express wrote, "This is hip-hop without irony, geared for people who prefer feel-good vibes and songs with happy endings." A.J. Wolosenko of Vibe wrote, "True & Livin' is an album full of contradictions, and that's what makes it so interesting and appealing." Del F. Cowie of Exclaim! commented that "While past efforts dabbled with drum & bass and delved into melodic electronics and live instrumentation, this organic effort represents the most potent synthesis yet of their spiritually-infused hip-hop."

== Track listing ==
No.	Title	Length
1.	"True"	0:58
2.	"Doin' My Thang"	3:28
3.	"Bird's Eye View"	2:34
4.	"The Bay"	3:48
5.	"Luv"	3:25
6.	"Soo Tall"	3:06
7.	"I Need Mo"	4:27
8.	"Rockin'"	1:16
9.	"Temperature" (featuring Talib Kweli)	2:43
10.	"One Chance"	4:11
11.	"Amerika"	1:39
12.	"Poems 4 Post Modern Decay" (featuring Aesop Rock)	4:25
13.	"Heads Up"	2:48
14.	"Next to U"	3:48
15.	"What U Hear" (featuring Del the Funky Homosapien)	6:09
16.	"Stranger in My Home" (featuring Gift of Gab)	3:49
17.	"Oh Lawd Blues"	3:27
18.	"Livin'"	3:14
