= Politicks: Collabs & B-Sides =

Compilation album by Zion I
- Released: 2004
- Genre: Hip hop
- Label: Live Up Records
- Producer: AmpLive; Vin Roc; Ese; Hipsta; DJ Tonk; Dev 1

Zion I chronology
Curb Servin': The Mixtape Sessions (2003)	Politicks: Collabs & B-Sides (2004)	Family Business (2004)

Politicks: Collabs & B-Sides is a compilation album by Oakland Hip hop duo Zion I, released in 2004 on the duo's own Live Up Records imprint. The album is compiled of various collaborative tracks and single B-sides.

== Track listing ==
#	Title	Producer(s)	Performer (s)
1	"Intro"	AmpLive	Interlude
2	"Hit Em Up"	Vin Roc	Zion
3	"Building Blocks"	Ese, Hipsta	Zion
4	"Raw Basement"	DJ Tonk	Zion
5	"Wanna Job Interlude"	AmpLive	Interlude
6	"Show Bizness"	AmpLive	Zion, Masterminds
7	"Crate Escape"	AmpLive	Zion, D.U.S.T., Deuce Eclipse, Foreign Legion, Khari
8	"Earth & Heaven"	AmpLive	Zion, Goapele
9	"We Got It"	AmpLive	Zion
10	"Bathe in the Water"	AmpLive	Zion
11	"Monster Interlude"	AmpLive	Interlude
12	"Communification"	Ese, Hipsta	Zion, Breez Evahflowin', L.I.F.E. Long
13	"We're at War"	AmpLive	Zion, Akrobatik
14	"Right Time"	AmpLive	Zion, Deuce Eclipse
15	"Spinnin'"	Dev 1	Zion
16	"Outro"	AmpLive	Interlude
