= The Inner Light =

The Inner Light or Inner Light may refer to:

== Beliefs ==
- Inner light, a Quaker concept
- Society of the Inner Light, a magical society and Western mystery school
- Temple of the True Inner Light, a psychedelic church in New York City

== Songs ==
- "The Inner Light" (song), a 1968 song by the Beatles
- "Inner Light" (song), a 2000 song by Zion I

== Other uses ==
- "The Inner Light" (Star Trek: The Next Generation), an episode of the television series Star Trek: The Next Generation
