= Deep Water Slang V2.0 =

Studio album by Zion I
- Released: February 18, 2003
- Genre: Hip-hop
- Length: 62:00
- Label: Raptivism Records
- Producer: 418 Hz Productionz

Zion I chronology
Mind over Matter (2000)	Deep Water Slang V2.0 (2003)	True & Livin' (2005)

Singles from Deep Water Slang V2.0
- 1. "Boom Bip" Released: 2001; 2. "Cheeba Cheeba" Released: 2002; 3. "The Drill" Released: 2003

Deep Water Slang V2.0 is a studio album by Zion I. It was released by Raptivism Records in 2003. It peaked at number 49 on the Billboard Independent Albums chart.

== Critical reception ==
Professional ratings
Review scores
Source	Rating
AllMusic	2/5 stars
Entertainment Weekly	A−

Scott Thill of AllMusic gave the album 2 out of 5 stars, writing, "This Berkeley-based (big ups, Cal Bears!) underground hip-hop duo's sophomore effort is chock-full of their usual lyrical hooks and flows, but as with much product released by those looking to make their way in the bling-bling marketplace, it suffers somewhat in the production department." Thomas Quinlan of Exclaim! wrote, "Even now, when people are becoming more open to experimentation in hip-hop, it's rare to see such a diverse album still easily identified as hip-hop." Nathan Rabin of The A.V. Club praised "a heightened sense of political consciousness."

== Track listing ==
No.	Title	Length
1.	"Jahmbo"	0:34
2.	"The Drill"	3:09
3.	"Warriors Dance" (featuring Pep Love)	3:41
4.	"Finger Paint" (featuring Susie Suh and Dust)	4:31
5.	"Kharma"	4:06
6.	"Flow" (featuring The Grouch)	5:25
7.	"A.E.I.O.U."	3:27
8.	"Deepwaterslang"	1:12
9.	"Cheeba Cheeba" (featuring Aceyalone)	2:49
10.	"Kick Snare" (featuring Dust and Deuce Eclipse)	2:34
11.	"Sorry"	5:13
12.	"Le, Le, Le"	4:03
13.	"Boom Bip" (featuring Goapele)	4:20
14.	"Mind Blow"	4:38
15.	"Dune"	3:32
16.	"One More Thing" (featuring Susie Suh; bonus track)	3:41
17.	"The End" (bonus track)	3:55

== Personnel ==
Credits adapted from liner notes.

- Zion (Zion I) – vocals, berimbau (12), flute (15)
- 418 Hz Productionz (Zion I) – production
- DJ Fuze – turntables (1)
- Queen Jahneen – vocals (1)
- Tef the Traktitioner – co-production (2), keyboards (2)
- DJ J-Period – turntables (2, 5)
- Pep Love – vocals (3)
- Jog9 – vocals (3, 9)
- Susie Suh – vocals (4, 5)
- Dust – vocals (4, 12)
- B'nai Rebelsfront – guitar (4)
- Errol Cooney – guitar (4)
- Vernon Hall – bass guitar (4)
- Josh Jones – drums (4)
- Deuce Eclipse – vocals (5, 12)
- The Grouch – vocals (6)
- Goapele – vocals (6, 11, 13)
- Ajai Jackson – piano (6), electric piano (6), string arrangement (11)
- Steve Hogan – upright bass (6)
- Max MacVeety – drums (6)
- Vin Roc – turntables (6, 9, 14)
- Mike Tiger – synthesizer (7), guitar (14)
- Paris King – guitar (8)
- Aceyalone – vocals (9)
- Martin Luther – vocals (9)
- Killa Kela – human beatbox (10)
- DJ D-Sharp – turntables (10)
- Robert Thompson – violin (10)
- Quincy Griffin – flute (11)
- Betsy London – viola (11)
- Jeff Watson – cello (11)
- Willie Maze – turntables (12)
- Blak Lion – guitar (13)
- Jason Moss – mixing
- Justin Weis – mastering
- Theo Rodrigues – art direction, layout
- Martin Aranuado – art direction, layout
- Victor J. Brunetti – additional layout
- Robin Twomey – photography

== Charts ==
Chart	Peak position
US Independent Albums (Billboard)	49
