= Atomic Clock (Zion I album) =

Studio album by Zion I
- Released: November 9, 2010
- Genre: Hip-hop
- Length: 40:28
- Label: Gold Dust Media
- Producer: AmpLive; Ben Yonas; Zumbi

Zion I chronology
The Takeover (2009)	Atomic Clock (2010)	Heroes in the Healing of the Nation (2011)

Atomic Clock is the seventh studio album by American hip-hop duo Zion I. It was released in November 2010 through Gold Dust Media. Produced by AmpLive, Ben Yonas and Zumbi, it features guest appearances from Locksmith, Macklemore, Martin Luther McCoy and Rebelution. In the United States, the album peaked at number 64 on the Top R&B/Hip-Hop Albums and number 24 on the Heatseekers Albums charts.

== Critical reception ==
Professional ratings
Review scores
Source	Rating
AllMusic	3/5 stars
HipHopDX	3/5
PopMatters	5/10
RapReviews	9/10
The Skinny	3/5 stars

Steve 'Flash' Joun of RapReviews praised the album, stating: "the beauty of Atomic Clock is that from the "Foreword" to the "Auto Automic" finale, you could pull any song from this release and open the eyes of a jaded hip-hop listener who thinks that rap really IS dead in 2010". AllMusic's Eric Luecking gave the album 3 out of 5 stars, resuming: "anyone who enjoys crisp beats will be able to find at least a few songs to nod their heads to". Kevin Gary of HipHopDX highlighed AmpLive's production for its sonic texture, describing the album as "not nearly as serious as it would have liked to have been". Martin Skivington of The Skinny described the album as "a bubbling concoction of beats and synths, on which Zumbi delivers melodic, space-themed rhymes", noticing that "sometimes the duo's mix of beats and street-level philosophy falls victim to dodgy choruses". David Maine of PopMatters gave the album 5 out of 10 stars, describing it as "a record that starts strong, then fades".

== Track listing ==
All tracks are written by Stephen Gaines, Anthony Anderson and Ben Yonas.

No.	Title	Producer(s)	Length
1.	"Foreword"		0:26
2.	"Always"	AmpLive; Ben Yonas	2:35
3.	"4U"	Ben Yonas	3:20
4.	"The Sealing"	AmpLive	3:11
5.	"Signs of Light"	AmpLive; Ben Yonas	3:22
6.	"Polarity" (featuring Macklemore and Locksmith)	AmpLive	3:36
7.	"Girlz" (featuring Martin Luther)	AmpLive	3:05
8.	"Many Stylez" (featuring Rebelution)	AmpLive; Ben Yonas	4:33
9.	"North Star"	AmpLive; Ben Yonas	3:57
10.	"The Sun Came Out"	AmpLive; Ben Yonas	4:34
11.	"Infatuation"	AmpLive; Ben Yonas; Zumbi	2:47
12.	"The History"		2:34
13.	"Auto Automatic"	AmpLive; Ben Yonas	2:28
Total length:			40:28

== Charts ==
Chart (2010)	Peak position
US Top R&B/Hip-Hop Albums (Billboard)	64
US Heatseekers Albums (Billboard)	24
