= Mind over Matter (Zion I album) =

Mind Over Matter

Studio album by Zion I
- Released: May 30, 2000
- Genre: Hip-hop alternative hip-hop conscious hip-hop underground hip-hop west coast hip-hop
- Length: 74:18
- Label: Ground Control Records
- Producer: 418Hz Productionz

Zion I chronology
| Mind Over Matter (2000) | Deep Water Slang V2.0 (2003) |

Singles from Mind over Matter
- 1. "Inner Light" Released: 1998; 2. "Critical" Released: 1999; 3. "Revolution" Released: 2000

Mind over Matter is the debut studio album by Zion I. It was released by Ground Control Records in 2000. It was nominated for Independent Album of the Year by The Source, in 2000.

== Critical reception ==
Professional ratings
Review scores
| Source | Rating |
|---|---|
| AllMusic | 3/5 stars |
| The A.V. Club | favorable |
| RapReviews | 9/10 |
| The Source | 3/5 stars |

Jon Azpiri of AllMusic wrote, "Influenced equally by hip-hop and various forms of electronica, Zion I offers listeners a collage of new sounds mixed with ancient spiritualism." Del F. Cowie of Exclaim! called it "a truly invigorating affair."

In 2015, HipHopDX included it on the "30 Best Underground Hip Hop Albums Since 2000" list.

== Track listing ==
| No. | Title | Length |
|---|---|---|
| 1. | "Creation" | 0:55 |
| 2. | "Revolution (B-Boy Anthem)" | 4:11 |
| 3. | "Critical" (featuring Planet Asia) | 3:57 |
| 4. | "Mysterious Wayz" | 4:17 |
| 5. | "Tha Choice" | 1:17 |
| 6. | "Koncrete Jungle" | 3:57 |
| 7. | "Metropolis" | 2:42 |
| 8. | "Oh Lawd" | 0:26 |
| 9. | "Trippin'" | 5:08 |
| 10. | "How Many" | 4:36 |
| 11. | "Elevation" | 5:58 |
| 12. | "A Little Change" | 3:39 |
| 13. | "Fools Gold" | 0:55 |
| 14. | "Venus" | 4:33 |
| 15. | "Rap Degreez" | 3:03 |
| 16. | "Silly Puddy" (featuring The Grouch) | 5:34 |
| 17. | "Inner Light" | 3:14 |
| 18. | "Big Ups" | 2:39 |
| 19. | "All tha Way" (featuring Knowmatic, Eclipse 427, and Rasco) | 4:44 |
| 20. | "One" | 4:01 |
| 21. | "Inner Light (Icey Mix)" | 4:26 |
