= The Takeover (album) =

Studio album by Zion I
- Released: February 17, 2009
- Genre: Hip-hop
- Length: 48:10
- Label: Gold Dust Media
- Producer: Amp Live

Zion I chronology
| Heroes in the City of Dope (2006) | The Takeover (2009) | Atomic Clock (2010) |

Singles from The Takeover
- 1. "Juicy Juice" Released: 2008

The Takeover is a studio album by Zion I. It was released by Gold Dust Media in 2009. It peaked at number 36 on the Billboard Heatseekers Albums chart.

== Critical reception ==
Professional ratings
Aggregate scores
| Source | Rating |
|---|---|
| Metacritic | 58/100 |
Review scores
| Source | Rating |
| HipHopDX | 2.5/5 |
| PopMatters | 5/10 stars |
| Spin | 7/10 |

At Metacritic, which assigns a weighted average score out of 100 to reviews from mainstream critics, the album received an average score of 58, based on 7 reviews, indicating "mixed or average reviews".

Andres Tardio of HipHopDX gave the album a 2.5 out of 5, writing, "Although they should be applauded for experimentation with different styles, their eagerness to please everyone inevitably took over the album in a negative way." Rachel Swan of East Bay Express called it "a producers' album, wherein all imagination and experimental energy lies in the beats, while the substantive content of the raps ceases to matter."

== Track listing ==
| No. | Title | Length |
|---|---|---|
| 1. | "The Taking" | 0:07 |
| 2. | "Geek to the Beat" | 2:43 |
| 3. | "Takeover" | 3:11 |
| 4. | "DJ DJ" | 3:42 |
| 5. | "Antenna" | 3:59 |
| 6. | "Caged Bird Part 1" (featuring Brother Ali) | 1:10 |
| 7. | "In the Mornin' (Caged Bird Part 2)" | 1:11 |
| 8. | "Radio" | 0:56 |
| 9. | "Gumbo" | 1:14 |
| 10. | "Country Baked Yams" (featuring Devin the Dude) | 0:55 |
| 11. | "Coastin'" (featuring K.Flay) | 1:38 |
| 12. | "Juicy Juice" | 1:05 |
| 13. | "Peppermint Patty" | 1:27 |
| 14. | "Bring In the Light" | 1:13 |
| 15. | "Legacy" (featuring Ty and Jennifer Johns) | 1:12 |

== Charts ==
| Chart | Peak position |
|---|---|
| US Heatseekers Albums (Billboard) | 36 |
