= Japanese Heavy Rock Hits =

Compilation album by Boris
- Released: September 14, 2009
- Genre: Rock; shoegazing; pop; heavy metal; alternative rock
- Length: 37:46
- Label: Southern Lord Records
- Producer: Boris

Boris chronology
Golden Dance Classics (2009)	Japanese Heavy Rock Hits (2009)	BXI (2010)

Japanese Heavy Rock Hits is a collection of singles by the Japanese experimental band Boris. Volume 1 was released on September 14, 2009 through the label Southern Lord Records; the successive volumes followed one per month afterward. Artwork for each single is in a glam rock cliché and features a single band member whose style is prominent on the songs on the accompanying release; the fourth single, a cover song, has a transparent PVC sleeve, and was bundled with preorders of the series along with a T-shirt. The only physical release was on separate 7" vinyl records, though digital versions (save vol. 4) in MP3 and FLAC were available from online retailers.

Initial track list information included "8" as track 2 on Heavy Rocks and "16:47:52..." as track 6 on Attention Please, but the official preorder revealed they were replaced by "Leak -Truth,yesnoyesnoyes-" and "You" respectively. Two alternate mixes of "Black Original" were used for the Japanese release of New Album, and a live version of "8" is featured as a download bonus for Noise.

== Track listing ==
Japanese Heavy Rock Hits v1
No.	Title	Length
1.	"8"	5:14
2.	"Hey Everyone"	4:05
Total length:		9:19

Japanese Heavy Rock Hits v2
No.	Title	Length
3.	"H.M.A. -Heavy Metal Addict-"	5:36
4.	"Black Original"	4:24
Total length:		10:00

Japanese Heavy Rock Hits v3
No.	Title	Length
5.	"16:47:52"	7:05
6.	"...and hear nothing"	5:33
Total length:		12:38

Japanese Heavy Rock Hits v4
No.	Title	Length
7.	"Seasons (Earth and Fire cover)"	5:49
Total length:		5:49

== Credits ==
- Takeshi – Vocals, guitar and bass
- Wata – Vocals, guitar
- Atsuo – Vocals, drums and percussion
- Souichiro Nakamura – Mixing and Mastering (volumes 1-3)
- Fangsanalsatan – Recording, logo type, mixing and mastering (volume 4)
- SOMA – Design
- Miki Matsushima – Photography
