= Heavy Rocks (2011 album) =

Studio album by Boris
- Released: May 24, 2011
- Recorded: 2009–2011 at Sound Square
- Genre: Stoner metal; post-metal; sludge metal
- Length: 53:00 (Sargent House CD); 52:07 (Daymare CD)
- Label: Sargent House, Daymare Recordings
- Producer: Boris

Boris chronology
New Album (2011)	Heavy Rocks (2011)	Attention Please (2011)

Professional ratings
Aggregate scores
Source	Rating
Metacritic	70/100
Review scores
Source	Rating
Allmusic	3.5/5 stars
The A.V. Club	B+
Consequence of Sound	C-
Drowned in Sound	7/10
Pitchfork Media	5.2/10
Popmatters	7/10 discs
Rock Sound	8/10
Spin	7/10
Sputnikmusic	4/5

Heavy Rocks is the fifteenth studio album by the Japanese experimental band Boris. The album was released on May 24, 2011, through the label Sargent House. It is the second of three Boris albums of this title, with the others being released in 2002 and 2022; all feature the band exploring hard rock and heavy metal sounds. The band repeated the album title for this release because they "seek to redefine 'heavy' music in a culmination of the band's tireless efforts over the past two decades".

The album was released on the same day as Attention Please, with which it shares the track "Aileron." It also shares different mixes of the songs "Jackson Head" and "Tu, La La" with New Album.

== Background ==
Initial track list information had the song "8" (previously available on Japanese Heavy Rock Hits) listed as the second track, but the final release replaced it with "Leak -Truth, yesnoyesnoyes." On March 29, 2011, Pitchfork Media released the song "Riot Sugar" in promotion for the album.

The vinyl edition features extended versions of "Missing Pieces" and "Czechoslovakia." An additional full length mix of "Czechoslovakia" with vocals by Tomáš Zakopal was released on a split 7-inch with his band, Saade. On May 16, Heavy Rocks in its entirety was made available in full for streaming on NPR Music.

== Track listing ==
All songs and words by Boris with the exception of Track 2 by Boris and Keisuke Suzuki.

No.	Title	Length
1.	"Riot Sugar" ("甘い暴動", lit. "Sweet Riot")	3:56
2.	"Leak-Truth,yesnoyesnoyes-" ("Leak-本当の反対の反対の反対の反対-", "Leak (The Opposite of the Opposite of the Opposite of a Real Opposition)")	4:11
3.	"Galaxians"	4:09
4.	"Jackson Head" ("ジャクソンヘッド")	3:00
5.	"Missing Pieces"	CD:12:22 LP:14:27
6.	"Key" ("扉", lit. "A Door")	1:46
7.	"Window Shopping"	3:57
8.	"Tu, la la"	4:21
9.	"Aileron" ("エルロン")	12:45
10.	"Czechoslovakia" ("チェコスロバキア")	CD:1:35 LP:5:46

== Credits ==
- Takeshi – vocals, bass, and guitar
- Wata – guitar, echo, and keyboard
- Atsuo – vocals, drums, and percussion
- Michio Kurihara – guitar on tracks 2, 5, and 7
- Ian Astbury – vocals on track 1
- Kensuke Saito – analog synth on track 3
- Yoshiko Kawakita – vocals on track 7
- Faith Coloccia – piano on track 9
- Aaron Turner – voices, guitars, and loops on track 9
- Design by Fangsanalsatan and SOMA
- Recording by fangsanalsatan at Sound Square 2009–2011
- Mix and Mastering by Soichiro Nakamura at Peace Music 2011
- Translation by Yoshiko Ikeda
- Production by Boris
- Photos by Miki Matsushima
- Logotype by Futuyong
