= Office of Future Plans =

- Origin: Baltimore, Maryland, United States
- Genres: Punk rock
- Years active: 2009-2016
- Label: Dischord Records
- Members: J. Robbins; Gordon Withers; Brooks Harlan; Darren Zentek
- Website: officeoffutureplans.com

Office of Future Plans was a music project that was started in 2009 by J. Robbins, the former bassist of Government Issue and frontman/guitarist of Jawbox, Burning Airlines and Channels. Other members are the guitarist/cellist Gordon Withers, bassist Brooks Harlan and the drummer Darren Zentek (formerly of Kerosene 454 and also a member of Channels). They were signed to Dischord Records and released their only album, Office of Future Plans, on 12 November 2011. In an October 2016 interview, Robbins revealed that Office of Future Plans had split up.

== Discography ==
- Office of Future Plans (2011)
