= Attention Please (Boris album) =

Studio album by Boris
- Released: May 24, 2011
- Genres: Dream pop; shoegaze; noise pop; electropop; pop metal
- Length: 41:16
- Label: Sargent House
- Producer: Boris

Boris chronology
| Heavy Rocks (2011) | Attention Please (2011) | Präparat (2013) |

Singles from Attention Please
- 1. "Hope" Released: February 25, 2011

Professional ratings
Aggregate scores
| Source | Rating |
|---|---|
| Metacritic | 72/100 |
Review scores
| Source | Rating |
| AllMusic | 3.5/5 stars |
| The Austin Chronicle | 2.5/5 stars |
| Beats Per Minute | 66% |
| Consequence of Sound | B |
| Pitchfork | 7.1/10 |
| PopMatters | 7/10 |
| Treble | favorable |

Attention Please is the sixteenth studio album by the Japanese experimental band Boris. The album was released on May 24, 2011, through the label Sargent House. Its original release date was April 26, but this was pushed back. The album features vocals in every track sung by Wata.

Attention Please marks a departure from the Heavy Rocks sound, returning to the dream pop sound explored on New Album, as well as including elements of noise pop. The album was released without announcement.

The album was released on the same day and label as Heavy Rocks, with which it shares the song title "Aileron." The album features the tracks "Party Boy", "Hope", "Les Paul Custom '86" and "Spoon" from New Album in altered forms. "Party Boy" and "Les Paul Custom '86" additionally have third versions on the Japanese New Album vinyl release.

A version of "Tokyo Wonder Land" was previously released on the Golden Dance Classics split release with 9dw.

Initial track list information included "16:47:52" (previously available on Japanese Heavy Rock Hits) as track 6, but the official preorder revealed it is replaced by "You."

On February 25, the label released the track "Hope" as the only single from the album.

On May 16, NPR Music streamed Attention Please in its entirety.

== Composition ==
Musically, Attention Please consists of electropop, shoegaze, and pop metal styles. It also takes on the edge of post-punk, with the "angular" style influencing Wata's guitar work.

== Critical reception ==
Attention Please was met with "generally favorable" reviews from critics. At Metacritic, which assigns a weighted average rating out of 100 to reviews from mainstream publications, this release received an average score of 72 based on 20 reviews.

In a review for AllMusic, critic reviewer Thom Jurek wrote: "Attention Please comes as a very noteworthy and distinctive album in Boris' large and labyrinthine catalog, whether one likes it or not. It is their first to feature vocals on all tracks by lead guitarist Wata. The music is nocturnal, relatively slinky, and very atmospheric."

== Track listing ==
| No. | Title | Length |
|---|---|---|
| 1. | "Attention Please" | 5:12 |
| 2. | "Hope" | 3:26 |
| 3. | "Party Boy" | 3:50 |
| 4. | "See You Next Week" | 3:56 |
| 5. | "Tokyo Wonder Land" | 5:42 |
| 6. | "You" | 6:13 |
| 7. | "Aileron" | 2:01 |
| 8. | "Les Paul Custom ‘86" | 2:09 |
| 9. | "Spoon" | 4:16 |
| 10. | "Hand in Hand" | 4:30 |
| Total length: | | 41:16 |

== Credits ==
- Takeshi – vocals, bass & guitar
- Wata – vocals, guitar & keyboards
- Atsuo – drums & percussion
- Michio Kurihara – guitar on "Attention Please"
- Shinobu Narita – sound effects on "You"
- Eiji Hashizume – acoustic guitar on "Aileron"
- Soichiro Nakamura – mixing & mastering
