= New Album =

Studio album by Boris
- Released: March 16, 2011
- Genres: Alternative rock; shoegaze; blackgaze; dream pop; experimental pop
- Length: 45:39
- Labels: Tearbridge, Daymare, Sargent House
- Producer: Shinobu Narita

Boris chronology
| Klatter (2011) | New Album (2011) | Heavy Rocks (2011) |

Professional ratings
Aggregate scores
| Source | Rating |
|---|---|
| Metacritic | 78/100 |
Review scores
| Source | Rating |
| AllMusic | 4/5 stars |
| The A.V. Club | B+ |
| Consequence | B |
| Fact | 4/5 discs |
| Pitchfork | 6.5/10 |
| Sputnikmusic | 4/5 |
| Tiny Mix Tapes | 4/5 marks |
| Under the Radar | 6/10 stars |

New Album is the fourteenth studio album by the Japanese experimental band Boris. The album was released in Japan on March 16, 2011, on CD through Tearbridge (an imprint of major label Avex) and on double LP through Daymare Recordings, and was released worldwide with a different mix and track list through Sargent House on November 25, 2011. The CD and LP feature different versions of several tracks.

The label released the song "Party Boy" prior to the album, which also appears in an altered form on Attention Please. Other tracks shared with that album are "Hope" and "Spoon". The album also shares the tracks "Jackson Head" and "Tu, La La" with Heavy Rocks. "Black Original" has appeared on Japanese Heavy Rock Hits with different instrumentation than the two versions used for this release.

Spin put up a full stream of the Sargent House CD version on November 29, 2011.

== Track listing ==
=== Daymare 12" LP ===
| No. | Title | Length |
|---|---|---|
| 1. | "フレア (Vinyl Version)" ("Flare"; features introduction quoting the end of "Looprider") | 5:02 |
| 2. | "希望" ("Hope") | 3:40 |
| 3. | "Party Boy (Vinyl Version)" | 3:43 |
| 4. | "Black Original (Vinyl Version)" | 4:33 |
| 5. | "Pardon?" | 5:54 |
| 6. | "Spoon" | 4:23 |
| 7. | "ジャクソンヘッド" ("Jackson Head") | 3:09 |
| 8. | "黒っぽいギター (Vinyl Version)" ("Dark Guitar"; English title "Les Paul Custom '86") | 4:06 |
| 9. | "Tu, la la" | 4:11 |
| 10. | "Looprider (Vinyl Version)" | 6:59 |
| Total length: | | 45:40 |

=== Tearbridge CD ===
| No. | Title | Length |
|---|---|---|
| 1. | "Party Boy" | 3:49 |
| 2. | "希望" ("Hope") | 3:43 |
| 3. | "フレア" ("Flare") | 4:21 |
| 4. | "Black Original" | 4:27 |
| 5. | "Pardon?" | 5:59 |
| 6. | "Spoon" | 4:28 |
| 7. | "ジャクソンヘッド" ("Jackson Head") | 3:12 |
| 8. | "黒っぽいギター" ("Dark Guitar"; English title "Les Paul Custom '86") | 4:09 |
| 9. | "Tu, la la" | 4:15 |
| 10. | "Looprider" | 7:13 |
| Total length: | | 45:39 |

=== Sargent House CD ===
| No. | Title | Length |
|---|---|---|
| 1. | "Flare" (uses introduction from Daymare LP version) | 5:04 |
| 2. | "Hope" | 3:43 |
| 3. | "Party Boy" | 3:48 |
| 4. | "Luna" (alternate mix of song released on a split with Torche, Chapter Ahead Being Fake and Williams Street Records's compilation Metal Swim) | 8:29 |
| 5. | "Spoon" | 4:29 |
| 6. | "Pardon?" | 6:00 |
| 7. | "Jackson Head" | 3:11 |
| 8. | "Les Paul Custom '86" | 4:10 |
| 9. | "Tu, La La" | 4:15 |
| 10. | "Looprider" | 7:01 |
| Total length: | | 50:10 |

== Personnel ==
- Takeshi - Vocals, bass & guitar
- Wata - Vocals, guitar & keyboard
- Atsuo - Drums & percussion

== Pressing history ==
| Year | Label | Format | Country | Out of Print? | Notes |
|---|---|---|---|---|---|
| 2011 | Tearbridge | CD | Japan | No | |
| 2011 | Daymare | 2xLP | Japan | No | Ltd. 700 |
| 2011 | Sargent House | CD/LP | US | No | |
