= Zion I =

American hip hop duo

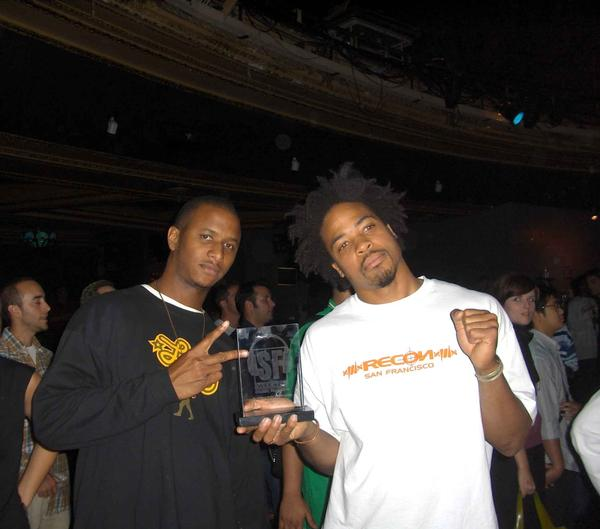
- Amp Live (left) and Baba Zumbi (right)

Background information
- Origin: Oakland, California, U.S.
- Genre: Alternative hip-hop
- Years active: 1996–2021
- Labels: Ground Control; Raptivism; Live Up; Gold Dust
- Past members: Baba Zumbi (deceased); K-Genius; Amp Live
- Website: www.zionicrew.com

Zion I was an American hip-hop project founded by MC and producer Baba Zumbi (real name Stephen Gaines) in Oakland, California. K-Genius and Amp Live were also project members.

== Career ==
Originally formed as a group, Zion I released the debut studio album, Mind over Matter, in 2000. It was nominated for "Independent Album of the Year" by The Source. Deep Water Slang V2.0 was released in 2003.

In 2005, Zion I released True & Livin'. It featured guest appearances from Gift of Gab, Talib Kweli, and Aesop Rock.

Heroes in the City of Dope, the first collaborative album with The Grouch, was released in 2006. In 2009, Zion I released The Takeover.

In 2010, Zion I released Atomic Clock. Heroes in the Healing of the Nation, the second collaborative studio album with The Grouch, was released in 2011. In 2012, Zion I released Shadowboxing, which was included on SF Weekly's "10 Best Bay Area Hip-Hop Records of 2012" list.

In 2015, Amp Live left the group, and Zion I became Baba Zumbi's one-man project.

In 2016, Zion I released The Labyrinth, their first studio album not to include Amp Live.

== Death of Stephen “Baba Zumbi” Gaines ==
On August 12, 2021, Gaines checked himself into the Alta Bates Summit Medical Center for a mental health examination. He had reportedly also contracted COVID-19 roughly three weeks prior. On August 13, 2021, he died of initially unknown causes at the age of 48. On August 20, 2021, the Gaines family announced that they hired attorneys to investigate what they believed was a suspicious death.

In May 2022, the Alameda County Coroner’s Bureau finalized a report detailing Gaines's death. According to officers and hospital staff, Gaines experienced a panic attack which involved him chasing hospital staff for fifteen minutes and putting a security officer in a "choke hold." The report stated that Gaines died after being held down by three hospital security guards and handcuffed by officers from the Berkeley Police Department while unconscious.

== Members ==
- Baba Zumbi – rapper (1996–2021)
- K-Genius – DJ (2000–2002)
- Amp Live – producer, DJ (1996–2015)

== Discography ==
=== Studio albums ===
- Mind over Matter (2000)
- Deep Water Slang V2.0 (2003)
- True & Livin' (2005)
- Break a Dawn (2006)
- Heroes in the City of Dope (2006) (with The Grouch)
- The Takeover (2009)
- Atomic Clock (2010)
- Heroes in the Healing of the Nation (2011) (with The Grouch)
- Shadowboxing (2012)
- Shadowboxing (The Remixes) (2013)
- The Labyrinth (2016)
- Stay Woke (2016) (with Mikos Da Gawd)
- The Tonite Show with Zion I (2018) (with DJ Fresh)
- The Endless Summa Mixtape (2018)
- Ritual Mystik (2018)

=== Compilation albums ===
- Curb Servin': The Mixtape Sessions (2003)
- Politicks: Collabs & B-Sides (2004)
- Family Business (2004)
- The Alpha: 1996–2006 (2006)
- Science of Breath (2006)
- Street Legends (2007)
- The Search & the Seizure (2008)
- Bringers of the Dawn (2009)
- Zion I Sampler (2010)
- Live at KEXP Vol. 5 (2009)
- Hella Fresh Fest (2013)
- The Rapture: Live from Oaklandia (2015)
- Street Legends (Volume 2) (2017)

=== EPs ===
- Enter the Woods (1997)
- New Dimensions (1998)
- Starship (1998)
- Chapter 4 (1999)
- The Vapors (2013)
- The Masters of Ceremony (2014)
- Libations (2014)
- The Sun Moon and Stars (2015)
- Wake Up (2017)

=== Singles ===
- "Inner Light" (1998)
- "Critical" b/w "Venus" (1999)
- "Revolution (B-Boy Anthem)" (2000)
- "Boom Bip" b/w "Le Le Le" (2001)
- "Cheeba Cheeba" b/w "Kharma" (2002)
- "The Drill" b/w "Flow" (2003)
- "Salt in the Game" b/w "Break Rap" (2005)
- "Bird's Eye View" b/w "Luv" (2005)
- "Temperature" b/w "The Bay" (2005)
- "Act Right" b/w "Target Practice" (2006)
- "One" b/w "Trippin" (2006)
- "Hit 'Em" (2006) (with The Grouch)
- "Lift Me Up" (2007) (with The Grouch)
- "Count It Down (Nomak Remix)" (2007)
- "Juicy Juice" (2008)
- "We Don't Wife 'Em" (2016)
- "Saving Souls" (2016)
- "Peace" (2017) (with Locksmith)
- "End Times" (2020)
- "2 Eyes" (2021)
- "Stay Focused" (2021)

=== Guest appearances ===
- Linkin Park – "Plc.4 Mie Haed" from Reanimation (2002)
- The Planets – "Can't Stop" from The Opening (2002)
- Triple Threat – "Hit 'Em Off" from Many Styles (2003)
- Goapele – "The Daze" from Even Closer (2004)
- Relic – "Trust Yourself" from Note to Self (2004)
- Rico Pabón – "Pa 'Fuera" from Louder Than Fiction (2006)
- Ty – "Oh!" from Closer (2006)
- DJ Deckstream – "Spread Love" from Soundtracks (2007)
- Omina – "Keep Move'n" from Bust (2007)
- Crown City Rockers – "B-Boy (Remix)" (2007)
- Guru – "For Ya Mind" from Guru's Jazzmatazz: Back to the Future (2008)
- Ise Lyfe – "Thigh Bone" from Prince Cometh (2008)
- CLP – "Rockin' Wiz Us" from Supercontinental (2008)
- The Jacka – "Dream" from Tear Gas (2009)
- Jern Eye – "Get Right" from Vision (2009)
- Webcam Hi-Fi – "Promised Land" from Livity Is My Temple (2009)
- Bicasso – "Party Metroid" from Rebel Musiq (2009)
- Pro the Leader & Dopestyle – "Back Wit a Vengence" from Hip Hop Depression (2010)
- Rebelution – "Safe and Sound Remix" from Remix EP (2011)
- Minnesota – "Float" from Altered States LP (2012)
- Latyrx – "It's Time" from The Second Album (2013)
- Matisyahu – "Built to Survive" from Akeda (2014)
- Bassnectar – "Lost in the Crowd" from Noise vs. Beauty (2014)
- Unified Highway – "Same Thing Coming" from Unified Highway (2016)
- Bassnectar – "The Antidote" from All Colors (2020)
