= Office of Future Plans (album) =

Studio album by Office of Future Plans
- Released: November 21, 2011
- Recorded: 2011
- Genre: Punk rock
- Label: Dischord Records

Professional ratings
Review scores
Source	Rating
The A.V. Club	B
Punknews.org	3.5/5 stars
Prefix	7.5/10

Office of Future Plans is a studio album by the band Office of Future Plans. It was released on November 21, 2011. It is the band's only album.

The album is dedicated to Iain Burgess.

== Track listing ==
1. "Salamander"
2. "Lorelei"
3. "Harden Your Heart"
4. "Ambitious Wrists"
5. "The Loyal Opposition"
6. "Your Several Selves"
7. "Abandon"
8. "You're Not Alone"
9. "The Beautiful Barricades"
10. "FEMA Coffins"
11. "Dumb It Down"
12. "Riddle Me This"

== Personnel ==
- J. Robbins - guitar, vocals
- Gordon Withers - cello, guitar
- Brooks Harlan - bass guitar, vocals
- Darren Zentek - drums
