= The Lone Descent =

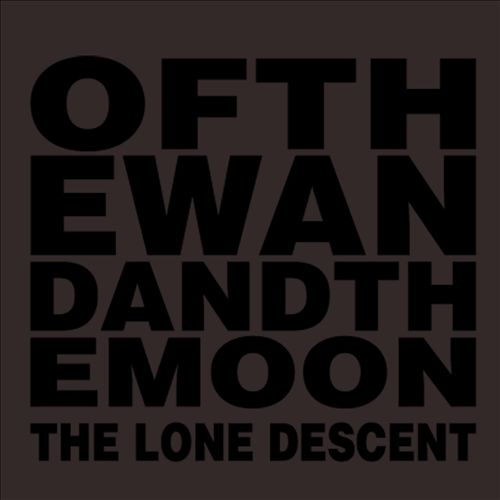

Studio album by Of the Wand & the Moon
- Released: 10 October 2011
- Genre: Neofolk
- Language: English
- Label: Heiðrunar Myrkrunar
- Producer: Kim Larsen

The Lone Descent is the fifth studio album by the Danish band Of the Wand & the Moon, released on 10 October 2011 through Heiðrunar Myrkrunar.

== Reception ==
Professional ratings
Review scores
Source	Rating
Berlingske	5/6 stars
Brutal Resonance	10/10
Damned By Light	8½/10
Gaffa	5/6 stars
Peek-a-Boo Magazine	9/10 stars
Politiken	5/6 stars

Berlingske's Jeppe Krogsgaard Christensen, Politiken's Simon Lund and Gaffa's Finn P. Madsen all gave The Lone Descent a rating of five out of six. Krogsgaard Christensen described it as Of the Wand & the Moon's "artistic culmination". Lund wrote that the fundamental neofolk concept has remained the same from the previous album, but "the texture has become many layers thicker"; Madsen wrote that the band has moved further away from previous models, such as Current 93 and Death in June, and closer to Lee Hazlewood and Phil Spector's "Wall of Sound". Krogsgaard Christensen highlighted the track "Tear It Apart" and wrote that the combination of melancholy, beautiful melodies and musical ambition on every track is "brilliant". Lund wrote that the "captivating melodies" should make it possible for the album to attract some international attention, and Madsen called it "absolutely one of the best Danish releases of the year".

== Track listing ==
All tracks are written by Kim Larsen

No.	Title	Length
1.	"Sunspot"	7:08
2.	"Absence"	6:31
3.	"A Pyre of Black Sunflowers"	8:35
4.	"Tear It Apart"	4:36
5.	"We Are Dust"	3:24
6.	"A Tomb of Seasoned Dye"	4:52
7.	"Is It Out of Our Hands?"	5:49
8.	"Watch the Skyline Catch Fire"	2:52
9.	"The Lone Descent"	6:50
10.	"Immer Vorwärts"	2:50
11.	"A Song for Deaf Ears in Empty Cathedrals"	6:22

Vinyl edition bonus track
No.	Title	Length
12.	"A Pyre of Black Sunflowers (Acoustic Version)"	8:35
