= Heroes in the Healing of the Nation =

Studio album by Zion I & the Grouch
- Released: March 22, 2011
- Genre: Hip-hop
- Length: 56:50
- Labels: Z & G Music
- Producers: Amp Live, The Grouch, Eligh

Zion I & the Grouch chronology
Heroes in the City of Dope (2006)	Heroes in the Healing of the Nation (2011)

Singles from Heroes in the Healing of the Nation
- 1. "Rockit Man" Released: 2011

Heroes in the Healing of the Nation is the second collaborative studio album by Zion I and the Grouch. It was released by Z & G Music on March 22, 2011. It is the follow-up to their 2006 collaborative album, Heroes in the City of Dope. It features guest appearances from Fashawn, Casual, and Freeway, among others. It peaked at number 13 on the Billboard Heatseekers Albums chart, number 47 on the Independent Albums chart, number 48 on the Top R&B/Hip-Hop Albums chart, and number 23 on the Top Rap Albums chart.

== Critical reception ==
Professional ratings
Review scores
Source	Rating
HipHopDX	favorable
Okayplayer	unfavorable
The Phoenix	3/4 stars
PopMatters	7/10 stars
The Rap Up	3.5/5 stars
RapReviews.com	8.5/10

Edwin Ortiz of HipHopDX commented that the album "invokes a general ambience of positivity that you'll rarely find these days." Meanwhile, Will Georgi of Okayplayer said, "[the] sanctimonious vibe just makes me feel like a difficult teenager and want to do anything but listen to Zion I & The Grouch."

== Track listing ==
No.	Title	Producer(s)	Length
1.	"Invitation" (featuring Brother Ali)	Amp Live	1:06
2.	"Leader"	Amp Live	2:46
3.	"Victorious People" (featuring Freeway and The R.O.D. Project)	Amp Live	4:05
4.	"Drop It on the 1"	Amp Live	4:16
5.	"It's Goin' Down" (featuring Jacob Hemphill)	Amp Live	4:36
6.	"I Used to Be a Vegan"	Amp Live	3:19
7.	"Rockit Man" (featuring Silk E)	Amp Live	4:24
8.	"Be a Father to Your Child" (featuring Roy Ayers)	Amp Live, The Grouch	3:47
9.	"Healing of the Nation"	Amp Live	4:11
10.	"Frankenstein"	Amp Live	4:10
11.	"Plead the Fifth" (featuring Codany Holiday, Fashawn and Casual)	Amp Live	4:43
12.	"Test of Time" (featuring Marty James)	Eligh	4:10
13.	"Journey to Forever" (featuring Mystic and Eric Rachmany)	Amp Live	7:49
14.	"Like a G" (featuring Los Rakas)	Amp Live	3:28

== Personnel ==
Credits adapted from liner notes.

- Zumbi (Zion I) – vocals
- Amp Live (Zion I) – production (except 12)
- The Grouch – vocals, production (8)
- Brother Ali – vocals (1)
- Gawain Mathews – guitar (1, 5, 14)
- Rio Amor – vocals (2)
- Kosi Warrn House – vocals (2)
- Tenshi Lucasey – vocals (2)
- Taariq Saffouri – vocals (2)
- Jesse Krebs – djembe (2)
- Headnodic – bass guitar (3, 10)
- Kev Choice – piano (3), keyboards (8)
- Freeway – vocals (3)
- The R.O.D. Project – vocals (3)
- D.U.S.T. – vocals (4)
- Jenny Jenn – vocals (4)
- Jacob Hemphill – vocals (5)
- Crystal Monee Hall – vocals (3, 5, 7, 10)
- Marcus Paul James – vocals (3, 7)
- Justin Johnston – vocals (3, 7)
- Mike Olmos – trumpet (5)
- DJ Platurn – turntables (6)
- Del the Funky Homosapien – vocals (6)
- Silk E – vocals (7)
- K.Flay – vocals (7)
- Mac Arthur – vocals (7)
- Adam Theis – horns (7)
- Roy Ayers – vocals (8)
- Lincoln Adler – saxophone (8)
- Tom Young – guitar (9)
- Codany Holiday – vocals (10, 11)
- Joy King – vocals (10)
- Malik Shabazz – vocals (10)
- Carl Wheeler – organ (11)
- Fashawn – vocals (11)
- Casual – vocals (11)
- Marty James – vocals (12)
- Eligh – production (12)
- Mystic – vocals (13)
- Eric Rachmany – vocals (13), guitar (13), keyboards (13)
- Joe Cohen – saxophone (13)
- Rafael Rodriguez – horns (13)
- Hellman Escorcia – horns (13)
- Mitchell "Jet Man" Wilcox – drums (13)
- Los Rakas – vocals (14)
- Jesse Krebs – drum interlude
- Ben Yonas – additional recording
- Alejandro Llinas – additional recording assistance
- Jason Moss – mixing
- Justin Weis – mastering
- Courtney Duvendack – layout, design
- Arian Stevens – photography

== Charts ==
Chart	Peak position
US Heatseekers Albums (Billboard)	13
US Independent Albums (Billboard)	47
US Top R&B/Hip-Hop Albums (Billboard)	48
US Top Rap Albums (Billboard)	23
