= Of the Wand & the Moon =

Neofolk/experimental project of Danish musician Kim Larsen

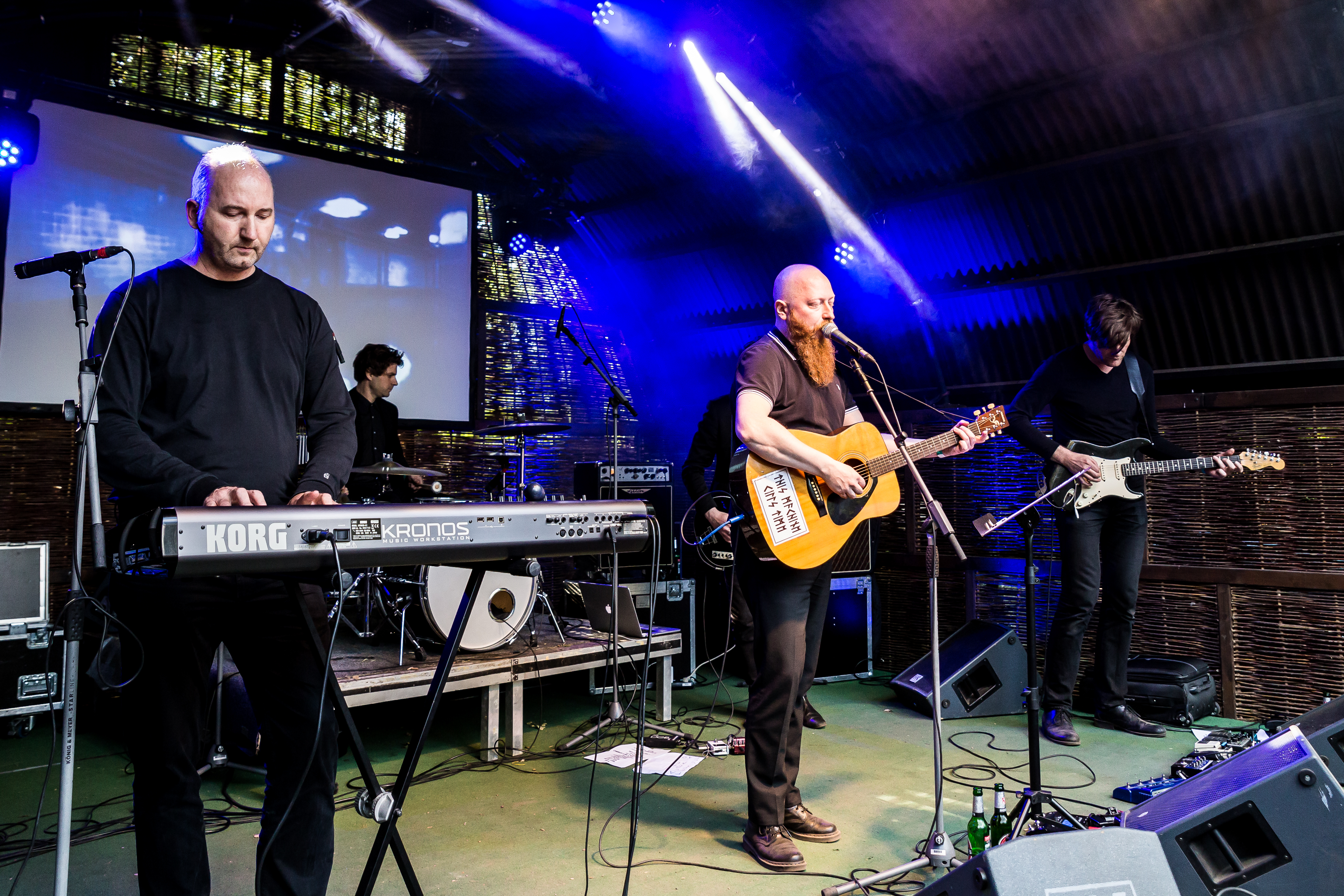
- Of the Wand & the Moon performing at the Nocturnal Culture Night in Deutzen, Germany, in 2017

Background information
- Origin: Denmark
- Genres: Dark ambient, experimental, folk, martial, neofolk, dark folk, post-industrial
- Years active: 1999–present
- Labels: Heiðrunar Myrkrunar
- Members: Kim Larsen

Of the Wand & the Moon (stylized as :Of the Wand & the Moon: (later releases feature "and" in lieu of the ampersand)) is the neofolk/experimental project of Danish musician Kim Larsen and various guest contributors.

== History ==
Larsen was originally a member of the gothic/doom metal band Saturnus, but left due to personal disputes. Following this, he began the neofolk project Of the Wand & the Moon, as he was a longtime fan of the genre.

Larsen lists among his musical influences the neofolk artists Death in June, Blood Axis, Current 93, Sol Invictus, Fire and Ice, Der Blutharsch, and Nature and Organisation. He credits Thunder Perfect Mind by Current 93 with making him want to be a neofolk artist, and calls Death in June's Rose Clouds of Holocaust the album that "means the most" to him. Thematically, he is influenced by runes, Aleister Crowley, Norse mythology, esoterica, and paganism. He once described his music as "loner folk".

In 1999, the debut Of the Wand & the Moon album was released, titled Nighttime Nightrhymes.

2001 saw the release of a second Of the Wand & the Moon release titled :Emptiness:Emptiness:Emptiness:.

After the release of a split album with Sol Invictus and a few vinyl singles, a collection of b-sides, taken from the :Emptiness:Emptiness:Emptiness: sessions, titled Lucifer, was released in 2003.

A third album, Sonnenheim, was released in 2005. Here, the music bears a strong resemblance to that of neofolk pioneers Death in June.

After a 6-year silence, a fourth album, The Lone Descent, was released in 2011. It features more contemporary influences and a richer production. The album was received with great critical acclaim and is considered a neofolk masterpiece.

10 years later, in 2021, a fifth album entitled Your Love Can't Hold This Wreath of Sorrow was released. It follows in a similar vein to that of The Lone Descent, but features even greater experimentation with other genres such as post-punk and electronica.

In 2023, a 4-track EP, Behold the Trees, saw the band embody a more minimalistic ambient sound with a spoken word approach to the vocals.

== Discography ==
=== Albums and EPs ===
Year	Title	Format, Special Notes
1999	Nighttime Nightrhymes	LP/CD
2000	Sól Ek Sà	7"
2000	Midnight Will	10", limited to 666 copies
2001	:Emptiness:Emptiness:Emptiness:	LP/CD
2001	Bringing Light and Darkness	12", split with Sol Invictus. Limited to 500 copies.
2001	My Black Faith	7"
2001	I Crave for You	7", limited to 1,000 copies.
2003	Lucifer	LP/CD, b-sides and recordings from the :E:E:E: sessions.
2003	:1998 - 2003:	Box set, limited to 500 copies. Contains vinyl versions of all previous albums.
2005	Hail Hail Hail	7"
2005	Sonnenheim	LP/CD
2011	The Lone Descent	LP/CD
2012	Live at the Lodge of Imploded Love	CD/DVD, recorded live at The Lodge of Imploded Love, summer 2011
2013	Shall Love Fall from View?	7", limited to 500 copies on black vinyl
2019	Bridges Burned and Hands of Time	LP/CD
2020	Tainted Tears	12"
2021	Your Love Can't Hold This Wreath of Sorrow	
2023	Behold the Trees	LP/CD. LP limited to 300 copies.
