= Therapy at 3 =

Studio album by Eligh and Amp Live
- Released: November 15, 2011
- Genre: Alternative hip-hop
- Length: 55:48
- Labels: Legendary Music, Live Up
- Producer: Amp Live

Eligh and Amp Live chronology
Therapy at 3 (2011)	Therapy After 3 (2012)

Professional ratings
Review scores
Source	Rating
East Bay Express	favorable
Exclaim!	favorable
Okayplayer	favorable

Therapy at 3 is the first collaborative studio album by Eligh and Amp Live. It was released by Legendary Music and Live Up in 2011. It peaked at number 33 on the Billboard Heatseekers Albums chart.

== Track listing ==
No.	Title	Length
1.	"Intro"	0:39
2.	"First Contact"	3:15
3.	"Guides"	2:54
4.	"Destination Unknown" (featuring The Grouch and Zumbi)	3:05
5.	"Stethescope" (featuring Basik)	2:39
6.	"Devil's Medicine"	2:13
7.	"Beautiful Addiction" (featuring Grieves and Blake Hazard)	3:55
8.	"Metronome"	3:49
9.	"Tattoo Song"	6:14
10.	"Ms. Meteor" (featuring Steve Knight)	3:55
11.	"Stop Running"	4:21
12.	"What's in a Name"	2:54
13.	"Ego Killer" (featuring Inspired Flight)	3:02
14.	"L.A. Dreamers" (featuring Busdriver)	3:13
15.	"Outro"	1:03

== Charts ==
Chart	Peak position
US Heatseekers Albums (Billboard)	33
