= AmpLive =

American record producer and disc jockey

Amp Live
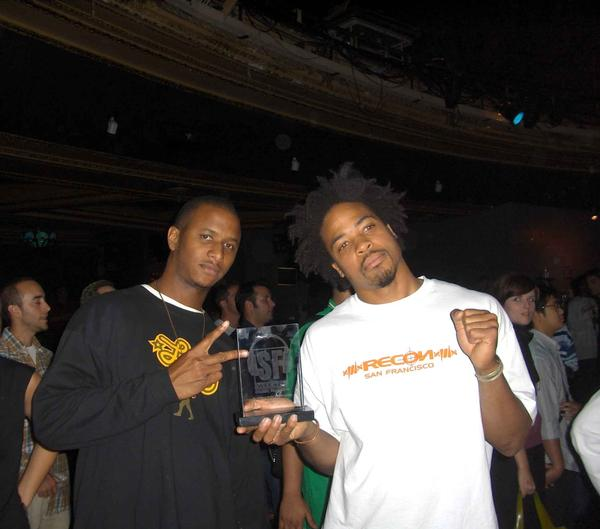
- Amp Live (left) with Baba Zumbi (right), as Zion I, 2008

Background information
- Born: Anthony Anderson; Texas, US
- Origin: California, US
- Genre: Alternative hip-hop
- Occupations: Producer, DJ
- Years active: 1996–present
- Labels: Plug Research, Gravitas Recordings, LRG, Child's Play, OM Records
- Formerly of: Zion I
- Website: amplivesworld.com

Anthony Anderson, known professionally as Amp Live, is an American alternative hip-hop producer and disc jockey. He was one half of the duo Zion I, but left the group in 2015 amicably. He has remixed works by Radiohead, Tokyo Police Club and Jamie Lidell.

== Life and career ==
Born and raised in Texas, Amp Live released Rainydayz Remixes, an 8-track remix project of Radiohead's In Rainbows, in 2008. He received a cease and desist letter from Warner/Chappell, informing him that Rainydayz Remixes "created musical arrangements/remixes" without proper approval. After building an internet movement, primarily through YouTube, Stereogum and Pitchfork, a settlement was reached and Amp Live was allowed to release the album for free. It was chosen by Wired as their "Best Free Download of the Week".

Amp Live released the solo album, Murder at the Discotech, in 2010. He released Therapy at 3, a collaborative album with Eligh, in 2011. In 2014, he released the album, Headphone Concerto, on Plug Research. In 2017, he released an EP, Atmosphere, on Gravitas Recordings.

== Discography ==
=== Studio albums ===
- Murder at the Discotech (2010)
- Therapy at 3 (2011) (with Eligh)
- Headphone Concerto (2014)
- Gate 13 (2018) (with Del the Funky Homosapien)
- Make the Beat Go Vol. 1 (2020)
- Make the Beat Go Vol. 2 (2021)

=== Compilation albums ===
- Electrowonderland Vol. 1: Drum n Bass Sessions (2005)
- Beats, Remixes, and a Side of Mashups (2008)

=== EPs ===
- Rainydayz Remixes (2007)
- Hot Right Now (2010)
- You Are Not Human: The Love EP (2011)
- One Dark Eskimo Remixes (2011)
- Kaleidoscope Theory: The Color EP (2013)
- Atmosphere (2017)

=== Singles ===
- "Gary Is a Robot" (2009)
- "Turn It Up" (2010)
- "Mister Sarode" (2013)
- "Brass Knuckles" (2013)
- "D.H.E.A." (2013)
- "Closer to the Sun (Colorado Dreamin')" (2014)
- "Penny Nickel Dime" (2014)
- "Power of People" (2020)

=== Productions ===
- Goapele – "Closer" from Even Closer (2002)
- The Grouch & Eligh – "Boom" from Say G&E! (2009)
- Latyrx – "It's Time" from The Second Album (2013)

=== Remixes ===
- Linkin Park - "Plc.4 Mie Hᴂd" (2002)
- Tokyo Police Club – "The Baskervilles" (2008)
- Jamie Lidell – "Out of My System" (2008)
