= 2002 in music =

This is a list of notable events in music that took place in the year 2002.

== Specific locations ==
- 2002 in British music
- 2002 in Norwegian music
- 2002 in Scandinavian music
- 2002 in South Korean music

== Specific genres ==
- 2002 in classical music
- 2002 in country music
- 2002 in heavy metal music
- 2002 in hip-hop
- 2002 in jazz
- 2002 in Latin music
- 2002 in progressive rock

== Events ==
=== January–February ===
- January 1 – Eric Clapton marries his 25-year-old American girlfriend in a surprise wedding ceremony at a church in the English village of Ripley, Surrey.
- January 14 – Adam Ant is committed to a psychiatric hospital two days after being arrested for carrying a firearm into a London pub that Ant claims was fake.
- January 18 – Rapper C-Murder is arrested and charged with second-degree murder over a fatal shooting in a Harvey, Louisiana nightclub on January 12.
- January 18–February 3 – The Big Day Out festival takes place in Australia and New Zealand, headlined by The Prodigy.
- January 23 – Virgin Records buys out its contract with Mariah Carey for $28 million, essentially paying her to not record any more music for the label.
- February 3 – U2 perform during the halftime show for Super Bowl XXXVI. U2's performance becomes a tribute to the victims of the September 11 terrorist attack.
- February 4 – Kiss bassist Gene Simmons has a notoriously antagonistic interview with Terry Gross on National Public Radio. Simmons continuously baits the host with sexual come-ons throughout the interview while Gross repeatedly calls Simmons "obnoxious." Simmons refuses to grant NPR permission to post the interview online, but unauthorized transcripts and audio exist.
- February 13 – Jennifer Lopez becomes the first singer to have a remix album, J to tha L–O! The Remixes, debut at number one, selling over 156,000 copies.
- February 15 – US singer Britney Spears takes her first starring role in Crossroads, a teen drama road film alongside Zoe Saldaña. Although the film is largely panned, it is commercially successful, grossing $61.1 million worldwide against a $12 million budget.
- February 27 – The 44th Annual Grammy Awards are presented in Los Angeles, hosted by Jon Stewart. The soundtrack for the film O Brother, Where Art Thou? wins Album of the Year, while U2's "Walk On" wins Record of the Year. Alicia Keys wins Song of the Year (for "Fallin'") and Best New Artist.

=== March–April ===
- March 7 – Burton C. Bell leaves Fear Factory after falling out with Dino Cazares. Fear Factory soon disband.
- March 12 – Silverchair withdraw from the Gone South festival in Australia after Daniel Johns contracts reactive arthritis.
- March 24 – Takahiro Nishikawa leaves Dreams Come True.
- March 25 – Celine Dion returns to the music scene after a four-year absence with the album A New Day Has Come.
- April 17 – Pop-punk giants Blink-182 and Green Day co-headline the two-month Pop Disaster Tour.
- April 22 – Sugababes release their first UK Number 1 single, a cover of Adina Howard's 1995 single Freak Like Me.
- April 27-28 – The Coachella Valley Music and Arts Festival takes place in California. Headlined by Björk and Oasis, the lineup also features The Chemical Brothers, The Prodigy, Cake, Foo Fighters, Jack Johnson, Queens of the Stone Age, The Strokes, The Vines and Belle and Sebastian. This year marks the festival's return to its original two-day format.

=== May–June ===
- May 8 – Mariah Carey signs a new record contract with Island Def Jam Music Group.
- May 12 – We Will Rock You, a jukebox musical based on the songs of Queen, opens at the Dominion Theatre in London, England.
- May 21 - Blink-182 guitarist Tom DeLonge forms post-hardcore side-project band Box Car Racer. Their album Box Car Racer is released.
- May 22 – Members of Alien Ant Farm are injured in an early morning tour bus crash in Spain that claimed the life of the driver.
- May 25 – The 47th Eurovision Song Contest, held at Saku Suurhall in Tallinn, Estonia, is won by Latvian singer Marie N with the song "I Wanna".
- May 26 - Eminem releases The Eminem Show, one of the bestselling hip-hop albums of 2002
- June 4
  - Avril Lavigne releases her debut studio album, Let Go.
  - The Prom at the Palace is held in London to commemorate the Golden Jubilee of Elizabeth II. Performers include the BBC Symphony Orchestra, the BBC Symphony Chorus, Kiri Te Kanawa, Angela Gheorghiu and Roberto Alagna.
- June 5 – U.S. soul and R&B singer R. Kelly, is charged with 21 counts of having sexual intercourse with a minor after a videotape allegedly showing him engaged in sexual acts with an underage girl is broadcast on the internet.
- June 11
  - Paul McCartney marries second wife Heather Mills in a lavish ceremony at Castle Leslie in Ireland.
  - American Idol premieres on Fox.
  - Korn releases fifth-studio album, Untouchables.
  - David Bowie releases his twenty-second studio album, Heathen. The album marks a commercial comeback for Bowie in the US, becoming his highest-charting album in the country since 1984's Tonight.
- June 12 – BMG Music agrees to acquire the rest of Zomba Music Group in a deal reportedly worth $3 billion.
- June 15 – The Los Angeles, California, USA, radio station KROQ-FM airs the 10th Annual Weenie Roast show with Bad Religion, Hoobastank, Jack Johnson, Jimmy Eat World, Moby, New Found Glory, P.O.D., Papa Roach, Puddle of Mudd, The Strokes, System of a Down, Unwritten Law, The Vines, The Violent Femmes and Rob Zombie.
- June 18 – Mexican Pop-Singer Paulina Rubio, releases her sixth studio album and debut-English crossover album in the U.S., titled Border Girl through Universal Records, she performed for the very first time live her hit single Don't Say Goodbye on The Tonight Show with Jay Leno, the album debuted at #11 on the Billboard 200 with sales of 56,000 copies becoming Rubio's highest-charting album in the U.S. It was eventually certified gold by RIAA, indicating sales of over 500,000 units.
- June 19 – Hikaru Utada releases the album Deep River, which sold 2,350,170 copies in a week, debuting at number 1 on the weekly, monthly, and annual Oricon album chart. This would be her third time at number 1 on the year-end rankings of that particular chart, a record for any Japanese musical act or worldwide.
- June 20 – Pop star Britney Spears, at only 20 years of age, is ranked by Forbes as the world's most powerful celebrity.
- June 21-23 – The first Bonnaroo Music Festival is held in Tennessee. Performers include Widespread Panic, Gov't Mule and Norah Jones.
- June 25 – The Prague Philharmonic Orchestra releases an arrangement of the Romeo and Juliet 1968 film soundtrack on the Silva America label. Will Smith also comes back with the release of his third solo studio album Born to Reign.
- June 27 – *The 23rd Montreal International Jazz Festival opens in Montreal, Quebec, Canada, lasting until July 7.
- June 30 – The Glastonbury Festival features headline acts Coldplay, Garbage, Stereophonics, Orbital, Roger Waters, Rod Stewart, and Air.

=== July–August ===
- July 6 – Michael Jackson stages a public protest against Sony Music chairman Tommy Mottola, accusing him of taking part in a racist conspiracy within the music industry to exploit black recording artists. Sony responds with a statement calling Jackson's remarks "ludicrous, spiteful and hurtful."
- July 9 – Red Hot Chili Peppers's 8th studio album By The Way is released. It sold 286,000 copies in the United States during the first week, peaking at #2 on Billboard 200. It went on to sell over 2 million copies in the US, being certified double platinum by the Recording Industry Association of America.
- July 12 – Buckcherry breaks up on the heels of lead singer Josh Todd's decision to quit the group. They would reunite in 2005.
- July 20–21 – The Splendour in the Grass music festival takes place in Byron Bay, Australia, headlined by Gomez and Supergrass.
- July 23 – My Chemical Romance's first album, "I Brought You My Bullets, You Brought Me Your Love" is released to the public.
- July 28 – The Area2 Festival, featuring headline acts Moby, David Bowie, Busta Rhymes, Ash, and Blue Man Group, begins a three-week tour in Washington, DC.
- August 17 – The Snow Mountain Music Festival opens in Lijiang, China.
- August 19 – Nickelback leaves the stage during the second song of their performance at the Ilha do Ermal festival in Portugal after being relentlessly pelted with rocks and bottles by the crowd.
- August 27 – Queens of the Stone Age release their critically acclaimed album Songs for the Deaf, featuring Dave Grohl on drums. The album earned the band their first Gold certification in the United States on January 27, 2003, selling over 500,000 copies.

=== September–October ===
- September 3 – Napster is shut down for good after a judge denies a bid from Bertelsmann to purchase its assets.
- September 4 – Kelly Clarkson becomes the first winner of the television talent contest, American Idol.
- September 11 – Marie Fredriksson of Roxette collapses at home, leading to the discovery of a brain tumor.
- September 18 – The 3rd Annual Latin Grammy Awards are held at the Kodak Theatre in Los Angeles.
- September 20 – Courtney Love announces that her legal dispute with the surviving members of Nirvana has been resolved, paving the way for the unreleased track "You Know You're Right" to be included on an upcoming compilation.
- September 28 – A stretch of Tennessee State Route 19 is officially named for Tina Turner, who was born and raised in nearby Nutbush, Tennessee.
- October 2
  - Robbie Williams signs a new six-album deal with EMI for £80 million, the most lucrative contract ever signed by a UK musician.
  - Christina Aguilera releases her controversial music video for the song, "Dirrty", the lead single from her second album Stripped.
- October 13 – The fifth Terrastock festival is held in Boston, USA.
- October 29 – Christina Aguilera releases her controversial second studio album Stripped, which enters the Billboard 200 at number 2, selling 330,000 copies in its first week. Stripped is the first studio album in three years since Christina Aguilera (1999).

=== November–December ===
- November 7 – Guns N' Roses fans in Vancouver riot after a concert, which was to kick off the band's first tour in nine years, is canceled due to Axl Rose's flight getting delayed.
- November 10 – Mick Jagger, Keith Richards, Elvis Costello, Lenny Kravitz, Tom Petty and Brian Setzer guest-star on an episode of The Simpsons set at a Rock 'n' Roll Fantasy Camp.
- November 12 – rap rock band Crazy Town release their second studio album Darkhorse.
- November 19 – Michael Jackson dangles his nine-month-old son, "Blanket", over the balcony of his Berlin hotel room in an apparent attempt to connect with the fans below. He releases a statement later that day calling the incident a "terrible mistake".
- November 29 – Concert For George is held at the Royal Albert Hall in London, as a memorial to George Harrison on the first anniversary of his death, under the musical direction of friend Eric Clapton. Performers included surviving Beatles members Paul McCartney, Ringo Starr, Clapton, Jeff Lynne, Ravi Shankar, and Billy Preston. The event benefitted the Material World Charitable Foundation.
- December 6 – Another riot over a canceled Guns N' Roses concert breaks out, this time in Philadelphia, after Axl Rose is a no-show. The band cancels the remaining dates of the tour without explanation.
- 11 December – The Nobel Peace Prize Concert is held at the Oslo Spektrum in Norway, with performers including A-ha, Willie Nelson and Laura Pausini.
- December 29 – A Creed concert in Chicago angers fans in attendance when lead singer Scott Stapp forgets many lyrics, takes a lengthy leave of absence in the middle of the show and lies down on the stage for part of the performance. The band's manager issues a written apology that includes the statement "we hope that you can take some solace in the fact that you definitely experienced the most unique of all Creed shows and may have become part of the unusual world of rock 'n' roll history!"
- December 31 – Phish end their two-year hiatus with a New Year's Eve concert at Madison Square Garden in New York City.

=== Also in 2002 ===
- Fergie joins The Black Eyed Peas during their recording of the Elephunk album.
- Seiji Ozawa is named musical director of the Vienna State Opera Orchestra.
- Salt-n-Pepa disbands.

== Bands formed ==
- See Musical groups established in 2002

== Bands disbanded ==
- See Category:Musical groups disestablished in 2002

== Bands reformed ==
- D.I. (after 1995 hiatus)
- Fear Factory
- Little River Band original members reform as Birtles Shorrock Goble
- KMFDM
- Phish (after 2000 hiatus)
- Stabbing Westward
- Suffocation

== Albums released ==
=== January–March ===
Date		Album	Artist	Notes
J A N U A R Y	1	I Am...	Ayumi Hamasaki	4th number 1 studio album
J A N U A R Y	1	The Wreckard	Prick	-
J A N U A R Y	8	I Am Sam: Music From and Inspired By the Motion Picture	Various Artists	Soundtrack
J A N U A R Y	8	Jukebox Sparrows	Shannon McNally	-
J A N U A R Y	8	Light of Day, Day of Darkness	Green Carnation	-
J A N U A R Y	14	Neon Golden	The Notwist	-
J A N U A R Y	15	Drive	Alan Jackson	-
J A N U A R Y	15	Group Therapy	Concrete Blonde	-
J A N U A R Y	15	Honour – Valour – Pride	Bolt Thrower	-
J A N U A R Y	15	Nude on the Moon: The B-52's Anthology	The B-52's	Compilation
J A N U A R Y	15	The Great Divide	Willie Nelson	-
J A N U A R Y	15	Tenth Dimension	Blaze	-
J A N U A R Y	18	World Outside	Socialburn	-
J A N U A R Y	21	Never Forget (Where You Come From)	Bro'Sis	-
J A N U A R Y	22	7	U2	EP
J A N U A R Y	22	Alkaline Trio / Hot Water Music	Alkaline Trio/Hot Water Music	Split EP
J A N U A R Y	22	And All That Could Have Been	Nine Inch Nails	Live DVD
J A N U A R Y	22	Bloodsport	Sneaker Pimps	-
J A N U A R Y	22	Flight of the Behemoth	Sunn O	-
J A N U A R Y	22	Golden Age of Radio	Josh Ritter	-
J A N U A R Y	22	The Playa Rich Project 2	Various Artists	Compilation
J A N U A R Y	22	The Process of Belief	Bad Religion	-
J A N U A R Y	22	Rock'n Roll Gangster	Fieldy's Dreams	-
J A N U A R Y	22	Spiritual Minded	KRS-One	-
J A N U A R Y	28	Come with Us	The Chemical Brothers	-
J A N U A R Y	29	Blaque Out	Blaque	-
J A N U A R Y	29	Classic Masters	General Public	Compilation
J A N U A R Y	29	Denials Delusions and Decisions	Jaguar Wright	Debut
J A N U A R Y	29	Elva	Unwritten Law	-
J A N U A R Y	29	The Essential Barbra Streisand	Barbra Streisand	Compilation
J A N U A R Y	29	Forever	Cracker	-
J A N U A R Y	29	Six Degrees of Inner Turbulence	Dream Theater	-
J A N U A R Y	29	Überjam	The John Scofield Band	-
J A N U A R Y	?	Two Rainy Nights	Joe Jackson	Live
F E B R U A R Y	1	O	Damien Rice	-
F E B R U A R Y	2	The Bled	The Bled	EP
F E B R U A R Y	4	Sons of Northern Darkness	Immortal	-
F E B R U A R Y	5	After Everything Now This	The Church	-
F E B R U A R Y	5	Daylight	Aesop Rock	EP
F E B R U A R Y	5	Frantic	Bryan Ferry	-
F E B R U A R Y	5	The Illusion of Safety	Thrice	-
F E B R U A R Y	5	J to tha L–O! The Remixes	Jennifer Lopez	Remix album
F E B R U A R Y	5	Suicide by My Side	Sinergy	-
F E B R U A R Y	5	Ultimate Manilow	Barry Manilow	Compilation
F E B R U A R Y	6	HTP	Hughes Turner Project	-
F E B R U A R Y	12	Always Got Tonight	Chris Isaak	-
F E B R U A R Y	12	Apathy and Exhaustion	The Lawrence Arms	-
F E B R U A R Y	12	Barricades & Brickwalls	Kasey Chambers	US
F E B R U A R Y	12	Feedback Is Payback	1208	-
F E B R U A R Y	12	Give 'Em the Boot III	Various Artists	Compilation
F E B R U A R Y	12	On the Road	Miss Kittin	Compilation
F E B R U A R Y	12	Read Music/Speak Spanish	Desaparecidos	Debut
F E B R U A R Y	14	One Deep Breath	Bradley Joseph	-
F E B R U A R Y	15	Funnel Weaver	Buckethead	-
F E B R U A R Y	15	Music from the Major Motion Picture Crossroads	Britney Spears	Soundtrack
F E B R U A R Y	15	Remedy Lane	Pain of Salvation	-
F E B R U A R Y	18	Geogaddi	Boards of Canada	Europe
F E B R U A R Y	18	Another Late Night: Zero 7	Zero 7	-
F E B R U A R Y	19	All Hail West Texas	The Mountain Goats	-
F E B R U A R Y	19	As If to Nothing	Craig Armstrong	-
F E B R U A R Y	19	Beautysleep	Tanya Donelly	-
F E B R U A R Y	19	Best of the Blues	Gary Moore	Compilation
F E B R U A R Y	19	Capricornia	Midnight Oil	-
F E B R U A R Y	19	Don't Worry About Me	Joey Ramone	-
F E B R U A R Y	19	Goodbye Blue & White	Less Than Jake	Compilation
F E B R U A R Y	19	Hate Breeds Suffering	Lock Up	-
F E B R U A R Y	19	Headstrong	Headstrong	-
F E B R U A R Y	19	Is a Woman	Lambchop	-
F E B R U A R Y	19	Kissin Time	Marianne Faithfull	-
F E B R U A R Y	19	Laugh	Keller Williams	-
F E B R U A R Y	19	Mobilize	Anti-Flag	-
F E B R U A R Y	19	Nihility	Decapitated	-
F E B R U A R Y	19	A Pair of Kings	Riders in the Sky	-
F E B R U A R Y	19	Sea of No Cares	Great Big Sea	Canada
F E B R U A R Y	19	The Stability EP	Death Cab for Cutie	EP
F E B R U A R Y	19	We Are the Only Friends We Have	Piebald	-
F E B R U A R Y	19	The Worst You Can Do Is Harm	The Long Winters	-
F E B R U A R Y	19	Knife Play	Xiu Xiu	Debut
F E B R U A R Y	22	Good to Go	Jimmy Eat World	EP
F E B R U A R Y	25	The Brotherhood	Running Wild	-
F E B R U A R Y	25	Catch 22	Hypocrisy	-
F E B R U A R Y	25	Full Moon	Brandy	-
F E B R U A R Y	25	Songs	Regina Spektor	-
F E B R U A R Y	25	Under Rug Swept	Alanis Morissette	-
F E B R U A R Y	25	Walking with Thee	Clinic	-
F E B R U A R Y	25	We Ain't Fessin' (Double Quotes)	Deep Puddle Dynamics / Anticon	EP
F E B R U A R Y	26	Belly of the Sun	Cassandra Wilson	-
F E B R U A R Y	26	Burn It Black	Injected	-
F E B R U A R Y	26	The Changing of Times	Underoath	-
F E B R U A R Y	26	Come Away with Me	Norah Jones	Debut
F E B R U A R Y	26	Gore Obsessed	Cannibal Corpse	-
F E B R U A R Y	26	The Guest	Phantom Planet	-
F E B R U A R Y	26	Immer	Michael Mayer	Mix Compilation
F E B R U A R Y	26	Lapalco	Brendan Benson	-
F E B R U A R Y	26	Live in a Dive	Bracket	Live
F E B R U A R Y	26	Lucky 7	The Reverend Horton Heat	-
F E B R U A R Y	26	Memories Are My Only Witness	Yuka Honda	-
F E B R U A R Y	26	Moulin Rouge! Music from Baz Luhrmann's Film, Vol. 2	Various Artists	Soundtrack
F E B R U A R Y	26	No Half Steppin'	Sharissa	-
F E B R U A R Y	26	Source Tags & Codes	...And You Will Know Us by the Trail of Dead	-
F E B R U A R Y	26	Superkala	Course of Nature	-
F E B R U A R Y	26	Trik Turner	Trik Turner	-
F E B R U A R Y	26	Watermelon, Chicken & Gritz	Nappy Roots	Debut
F E B R U A R Y	26	Earth, Wind & Fire: Live by Request	Earth, Wind & Fire	Video
M A R C H	1	Preface	Jessica Harp	-
M A R C H	1	Queen of the Damned	Various Artists	Soundtrack
M A R C H	3	Hate Made Me	8 Foot Sativa	-
M A R C H	3	Jebediah	Jebediah	-
M A R C H	4	D-D-Don't Don't Stop the Beat	Junior Senior	Debut
M A R C H	4	Hi-Fi Serious	A	-
M A R C H	4	Words of Wisdom and Hope	Teenage Fanclub	-
M A R C H	5	1919 Eternal	Black Label Society	-
M A R C H	5	Against Me! Is Reinventing Axl Rose	Against Me!	Debut
M A R C H	5	Attak	KMFDM	-
M A R C H	5	BYO Split Series, Vol. 3	NOFX/Rancid	Split LP
M A R C H	5	Didn't It Rain	Songs: Ohia	-
M A R C H	5	The Eleventh Hour	Jars of Clay	-
M A R C H	5	England, Half-English	Billy Bragg and The Blokes	-
M A R C H	5	Here Comes the Zoo	Local H	-
M A R C H	5	History Lessens	Skyclad	Compilation
M A R C H	5	IIcons	Naughty By Nature	-
M A R C H	5	The Second Stage Turbine Blade	Coheed and Cambria	-
M A R C H	5	Sha Sha	Ben Kweller	-
M A R C H	6	Burning Angel	Arch Enemy	EP
M A R C H	6	Encore	Joe Hisaishi	-
M A R C H	6	This Armor	Chihiro Onitsuka	-
M A R C H	6	The Way I Feel Today	Six by Seven	-
M A R C H	12	B2K	B2K	-
M A R C H	12	Become You	Indigo Girls	-
M A R C H	12	Chapters From a Vale Forlorn	Falconer	-
M A R C H	12	Favorite Noise	Reel Big Fish	Compilation
M A R C H	12	Home from Home	Millencolin	-
M A R C H	12	In Search Of...	N.E.R.D.	-
M A R C H	12	Modulate	Bob Mould	-
M A R C H	12	Resident Evil: Music from and Inspired by the Original Motion Picture	Various Artists	Soundtrack
M A R C H	12	This Is the Remix	Destiny's Child	Remix
M A R C H	12	VH1 Presents: The Corrs, Live in Dublin	The Corrs	Live
M A R C H	12	What It Is to Burn	Finch	-
M A R C H	13	Listen to My Heart	BoA	Japanese Debut
M A R C H	18	Cover Magazine	Giant Sand	-
M A R C H	18	In Our Gun	Gomez	-
M A R C H	18	Silent Night Fever	Dimension Zero	-
M A R C H	18	Spin	Darren Hayes	Solo Debut; Australia
M A R C H	19	Circle Gets the Square	Kevin Devine	-
M A R C H	19	Drunken Lullabies	Flogging Molly	-
M A R C H	19	An Evil Heat	Oxbow	-
M A R C H	19	Far Side of the World	Jimmy Buffett	-
M A R C H	19	Fused Together in Revolving Doors	The Red Chord	-
M A R C H	19	Hold Your Horse Is	Hella	-
M A R C H	19	Land (1975–2002)	Patti Smith	Compilation
M A R C H	19	Lust in Phaze	Soul Coughing	-
M A R C H	19	A Night at the Opera	Blind Guardian	-
M A R C H	19	No Pads, No Helmets...Just Balls	Simple Plan	-
M A R C H	19	Now That's What I Call Music! 9 (U.S. series)	Various Artists	Compilation
M A R C H	19	Pied Piper	Donovan	-
M A R C H	19	Primitive Plus	Edan	Debut
M A R C H	19	The Rest of Us	Gas Huffer	-
M A R C H	19	Rude Awakening	Megadeth	Live
M A R C H	19	Superstarved	Gravity Kills	-
M A R C H	19	The Trials and Tribulations of Russell Jones	Ol' Dirty Bastard	Compilation
M A R C H	19	VH1 Behind the Music: The Daryl Hall and John Oates Collection	Hall & Oates	Compilation
M A R C H	19	World Outside My Window	Glenn Lewis	-
M A R C H	20	Zvezdopad	Grazhdanskaya Oborona	-
M A R C H	23	Or	Golden Boy with Miss Kittin	-
M A R C H	25	Man and Machine	U.D.O.	-
M A R C H	25	Natural Born Chaos	Soilwork	-
M A R C H	25	A New Day Has Come	Celine Dion	-
M A R C H	25	Nocturnal Activity	Rae & Christian	-
M A R C H	25	Now That's What I Call Music! 51 (U.K. series)	Various Artists	Compilation
M A R C H	25	Original Pirate Material	The Streets	Debut
M A R C H	25	The Remote Part	Idlewild	-
M A R C H	25	Rock in Rio	Iron Maiden	2xCD; Live
M A R C H	25	Weight of the World	Harem Scarem	Japan; released in Canada Oct. '02
M A R C H	26	The Best of Both Worlds	R. Kelly & Jay-Z	-
M A R C H	26	Behind Silence and Solitude	All That Remains	-
M A R C H	26	Down II: A Bustle in Your Hedgerow	Down	-
M A R C H	26	Everyone Who Pretended to Like Me Is Gone	The Walkmen	-
M A R C H	26	The Future Is Now	Non Phixion	-
M A R C H	26	Instrumentals	The Nels Cline Singers	Debut
M A R C H	26	Kona Town	Pepper	-
M A R C H	26	Mindy McCready	Mindy McCready	-
M A R C H	26	Perseverance	Hatebreed	-
M A R C H	26	Special Edition	Infamous Mobb	-
M A R C H	26	Tell All Your Friends	Taking Back Sunday	-
M A R C H	26	Thrive	Newsboys	-
M A R C H	26	While You Weren't Looking	Caitlin Cary	Solo Debut
M A R C H		Affection	Koda Kumi	Debut
M A R C H	27	Roentgen	Hyde	-
M A R C H	31	Diorama	Silverchair	-

=== April–June ===
Date		Album	Artist	Notes
A P R I L	1	Cry	Simple Minds	-
A P R I L	1	Handcream for a Generation	Cornershop	-
A P R I L	1	Mclusky Do Dallas	Mclusky	-
A P R I L	1	Millennium Monsterwork 2000	Fantômas and Melvins	Live
A P R I L	1	Release	Pet Shop Boys	-
A P R I L	2	All of the Above	J-Live	-
A P R I L	2	Arrhythmia	Antipop Consortium	-
A P R I L	2	Ashanti	Ashanti	-
A P R I L	2	Every Road Leads Back to You	Juice Newton	-
A P R I L	2	Rampton	Teeth of Lions Rule the Divine	-
A P R I L	2	Southern Hummingbird	Tweet	-
A P R I L	2	Topsy-Turvy	The Apex Theory	Band later changed name to Mt. Helium
A P R I L	2	Tremulant	The Mars Volta	EP
A P R I L	2	Turn It Up!: The Very Best of	Busta Rhymes	Compilation
A P R I L	4	Bitterness the Star	36 Crazyfists	-
A P R I L	8	Can You Do Me Good?	Del Amitri	-
A P R I L	9	1000 Kisses	Patty Griffin	-
A P R I L	9	Are You Passionate?	Neil Young & Booker T & the MGs	-
A P R I L	9	Avoid One Thing	Avoid One Thing	-
A P R I L	9	Cabin Fever	Rasputina	-
A P R I L	9	Co-Balt	Brute	-
A P R I L	9	Good Health	Pretty Girls Make Graves	-
A P R I L	9	Gutterflower	Goo Goo Dolls	-
A P R I L	9	Hammered	Motörhead	-
A P R I L	9	How to Ruin Everything	Face to Face	-
A P R I L	9	Jinx	Quarashi	-
A P R I L	9	On	Imperial Teen	-
A P R I L	9	Mirror Mirror	Twiztid	EP
A P R I L	9	Plastic Fang	The Jon Spencer Blues Explosion	-
A P R I L	9	The Sham Mirrors	Arcturus	-
A P R I L	9	Silver Lining	Bonnie Raitt	-
A P R I L	9	Then Came the Night	Tommy Shane Steiner	-
A P R I L	9	Uninvisible	Medeski, Martin & Wood	-
A P R I L	14	Mali Music	Damon Albarn	-
A P R I L	14	No. 1	BoA	-
A P R I L	15	Hostile Ambient Takeover	Melvins	-
A P R I L	16	Assembly	Theatre of Tragedy	-
A P R I L	16	C'mon, C'mon	Sheryl Crow	-
A P R I L	16	Control	Pedro the Lion	-
A P R I L	16	Heart to Yours	Michelle Williams	Solo debut
A P R I L	16	Living Well Is the Best Revenge	Midtown	-
A P R I L	16	Long Walk Home: Music from the Rabbit-Proof Fence	Peter Gabriel	Soundtrack
A P R I L	16	Personal Journals	Sage Francis	-
A P R I L	16	Screwed Up Click Representa	Z-Ro	-
A P R I L	16	Slick Shoes	Slick Shoes	-
A P R I L	16	Waitin' on Joe	Steve Azar	-
A P R I L	17	WarCry	WarCry	Debut
A P R I L	22	Another Phase	Maria Mena	-
A P R I L	22	Love for the Streets	Caesars	-
A P R I L	23	About a Boy	Badly Drawn Boy	Soundtrack
A P R I L	23	12 Stones	12 Stones	
A P R I L	23	Cee-Lo Green and His Perfect Imperfections	Cee-Lo Green	Debut
A P R I L	23	Homecoming	Nazareth	Live
A P R I L	23	I Am Not Homer	Dan Castellaneta	-
A P R I L	23	Long Way Home	Dokken	-
A P R I L	23	No Shoes, No Shirt, No Problems	Kenny Chesney	-
A P R I L	23	Only a Woman Like You	Michael Bolton	-
A P R I L	23	Opaline	Dishwalla	-
A P R I L	23	Osaka	The Kickovers	-
A P R I L	23	Power of the Dragonflame	Rhapsody	-
A P R I L	23	Purple World	Big Moe	-
A P R I L	23	Stereo	Paul Westerberg	-
A P R I L	23	Thug Misses	Khia	-
A P R I L	23	When I Was Cruel	Elvis Costello	Compilation
A P R I L	23	Wood/Water	The Promise Ring	-
A P R I L	23	Yankee Hotel Foxtrot	Wilco	Nonesuch retail release
A P R I L	24	Bon Appetit	O.C.	-
A P R I L	24	Highvision	Supercar	-
A P R I L	24	Lifelines	A-ha	-
A P R I L	26	Guess Who's Back?	50 Cent	Mixtape
A P R I L	26	Heavy Rocks	Boris	-
A P R I L	27	Every Day	The Cinematic Orchestra	-
A P R I L	29	Doctor Syntax	Edwyn Collins	-
A P R I L	29	The Last Broadcast	Doves	-
A P R I L	29	Shadow Zone	Axel Rudi Pell	-
A P R I L	30	Be Not Nobody	Vanessa Carlton	Debut
A P R I L	30	Between the Buried and Me	Between the Buried and Me	Debut
A P R I L	30	Blazing Arrow	Blackalicious	-
A P R I L	30	Hood Rich	Big Tymers	-
A P R I L	30	Horizon	The Rocking Horse Winner	-
A P R I L	30	Living with the Past	Jethro Tull	Live
A P R I L	30	Music from and Inspired by Spider-Man	Various Artists	Soundtrack
A P R I L	30	Punk Rock Songs	Bad Religion	Compilation
A P R I L	30	Ready Ready Set Go	Simon & Milo	Compilation
A P R I L	30	Resonance Vol. 2	Anathema	Compilation
A P R I L	30	Trey Anastasio	Trey Anastasio	-
A P R I L	-	Electric Sweat	The Mooney Suzuki	-
M A Y	6	40 Years	The Dubliners	-
M A Y	6	Any Time Now	O.A.R.	Live
M A Y	7	Alice	Tom Waits	-
M A Y	7	All Night Long: An Introduction	Rainbow	Compilation
M A Y	7	Atticus: ...Dragging the Lake	Various Artists	Compilation
M A Y	7	Blood Money	Tom Waits	-
M A Y	7	Bug	Dave Davies	-
M A Y	7	Dark Days	Coal Chamber	-
M A Y	7	Immortality Lessons	Cul de Sac	Live
M A Y	7	Juslisen	Musiq	-
M A Y	7	Live: The Loom's Desire	Laura Nyro	-
M A Y	7	Memoirs	The 3rd and the Mortal	-
M A Y	7	MTV Unplugged No. 2.0	Lauryn Hill	Live
M A Y	7	My Ride's Here	Warren Zevon	-
M A Y	7	New Beat	The Exit	-
M A Y	7	PSI	Pitchshifter	-
M A Y	9	Story of the Year	Big Blue Monkey	-
M A Y	10	It's a Wonderful World	Mr. Children	-
M A Y	14	18	Moby	-
M A Y	14	The Big Come Up	The Black Keys	Debut
M A Y	14	Black Sun	Primal Fear	-
M A Y	14	Boo Hoo	Voltaire	-
M A Y	14	Come Home with Me	Cam'ron	-
M A Y	14	Commencement	Deadsy	-
M A Y	14	Down the Road	Van Morrison	-
M A Y	14	Fantastic Damage	El-P	-
M A Y	14	Maladroit	Weezer	-
M A Y	14	New Connection	Todd Snider	-
M A Y	14	On a Wire	The Get Up Kids	-
M A Y	14	Vapor Trails	Rush	-
M A Y	14	We Invented the Remix	P. Diddy & Bad Boy Records	Remix
M A Y	20	Destination	Ronan Keating	-
M A Y	20	The Other Side of the Looking Glass	Alias	Debut
M A Y	20	Redemption's Son	Joseph Arthur	-
M A Y	21	45 or 46 Songs That Weren't Good Enough to Go on Our Other Records	NOFX	Compilation
M A Y	21	45 RPM: The Singles of The The	The The	Compilation
M A Y	21	Alive or Just Breathing	Killswitch Engage	-
M A Y	21	Amarillo Sky	McBride & the Ride	-
M A Y	21	Bad Bad One	Meredith Brooks	-
M A Y	21	Bona Fide	Wishbone Ash	-
M A Y	21	Box Car Racer	Box Car Racer	Debut
M A Y	21	Castaways and Cutouts	The Decemberists	Debut
M A Y	21	The Golden Dove	Mary Timony	-
M A Y	21	Hollyweird	Poison	-
M A Y	21	I Luciferi	Danzig	-
M A Y	21	Killing the Dragon	Dio	-
M A Y	21	Leaving Through the Window	Something Corporate	Major label debut
M A Y	21	Legacy... Hymns and Faith	Amy Grant	-
M A Y	21	Little Big Town	Little Big Town	-
M A Y	21	Mended	Marc Anthony	-
M A Y	21	Merchants of Cool	Bad Company	Live
M A Y	21	Never a Dull Moment	Tommy Lee	-
M A Y	21	Now Presents: Off The Hook	Various Artists	Compilation
M A Y	21	Open Your Eyes	Goldfinger	-
M A Y	21	Raining on the Moon	William Parker Quartet featuring Leena Conquest	-
M A Y	21	Space Metal	Star One	-
M A Y	21	Sharpen Your Teeth	Ugly Casanova	-
M A Y	21	Ten Years and Running	MxPx	Compilation
M A Y	21	Thalía	Thalía	-
M A Y	21	Use Once and Destroy	Superjoint Ritural	-
M A Y	26	Chronicle: Best of the Work	Dr. Dre	Compilation
M A Y	27	Night on My Side	Gemma Hayes	-
M A Y	27	A Ruff Guide	Tricky	Compilation
M A Y	27	Sevas Tra	Otep	Debut
M A Y	27	Thinking It Over	Liberty X	UK
M A Y	28	The Eminem Show	Eminem	-
M A Y	28	Freedom	Andy Griggs	-
M A Y	28	Remission	Mastodon	Full-length Debut
M A Y	28	Say Something Nasty	Nashville Pussy	-
M A Y	28	Surrounded by Thieves	High on Fire	-
M A Y	28	A Young Trophy Band in the Parlance of Our Times	As Friends Rust	EP
J U N E	3	AnotherLateNight: Groove Armada	Groove Armada	Compilation
J U N E	3	Dying in Stereo	Northern State	Debut
J U N E	3	Live 1990	Hawkwind	Live 1990
J U N E	3	Storytelling	Belle & Sebastian	-
J U N E	3	Thought for Food	The Books	Debut
J U N E	3	Tres Lunas	Mike Oldfield	-
J U N E	4	The Beginning Stages of...	The Polyphonic Spree	US
J U N E	4	The Best of Buju Banton	Buju Banton	Compilation
J U N E	4	The Best of INXS	INXS	Compilation
J U N E	4	Cookie: The Anthropological Mixtape	Meshell Ndegeocello	-
J U N E	4	Details	Frou Frou	Sole studio album release
J U N E	4	Dirty Vegas	Dirty Vegas	-
J U N E	4	Electric	Jack Ingram	-
J U N E	4	The Elusive Light and Sound, Vol. 1	Steve Vai	-
J U N E	4	Good Morning Aztlán	Los Lobos	-
J U N E	4	High Society	Enon	-
J U N E	4	Interpol	Interpol	EP
J U N E	4	Let Go	Avril Lavigne	Debut
J U N E	4	Life Goes On	Donell Jones	-
J U N E	4	Moving Up Country	James Yorkston and the Athletes	Debut
J U N E	4	Murderworks	Rotten Sound	-
J U N E	4	The Private Press	DJ Shadow	-
J U N E	4	Reveille	Deerhoof	-
J U N E	4	Situationist Comedy	Dillinger Four	-
J U N E	4	Soundbombing III	Various Artists	Compilation
J U N E	4	Suicide Notes and Butterfly Kisses	Atreyu	-
J U N E	4	Under tha Influence	DJ Quik	-
J U N E	4	Warriors of the World	Manowar	-
J U N E	6	Live in Liverpool	Echo & the Bunnymen	Live
J U N E	6	Sing Sing Death House	The Distillers	-
J U N E	10	Just a Little More Love	David Guetta	Debut
J U N E	10	2G+2	The Fall	Compilation
J U N E	10	Plastic Skies	Bodyjar	-
J U N E	10	Writers Without Homes	Piano Magic	-
J U N E	11	Aziatic	AZ	-
J U N E	11	Blue Country Heart	Jorma Kaukonen	-
J U N E	11	Dying for the World	W.A.S.P.	-
J U N E	11	Full Circle	Boyz II Men	-
J U N E	11	God Loves Ugly	Atmosphere	-
J U N E	11	Heathen	David Bowie	-
J U N E	11	In Violet Light	The Tragically Hip	-
J U N E	11	It's Not Too Late	Neal Morse	-
J U N E	11	Live in the Classic City	Widespread Panic	Live
J U N E	11	Maia Sharp	Maia Sharp	-
J U N E	11	No!	They Might Be Giants	-
J U N E	11	Pet Sounds Live	Brian Wilson	Live
J U N E	11	Sticks and Stones	New Found Glory	-
J U N E	11	Suicide Invoice	Hot Snakes	-
J U N E	11	This Is The Life I Lead	Daz Dillinger	-
J U N E	11	Time Bomb High School	Reigning Sound	-
J U N E	11	The True Meaning	Cormega	-
J U N E	11	Untouchables	Korn	-
J U N E	18	As I Lay Dying/American Tragedy	As I Lay Dying/American Tragedy	Split Album
J U N E	18	Masquerade	Wyclef Jean	-
J U N E	18	Border Girl	Paulina Rubio	Debut-English Crossover Album
J U N E	18	Bunkka	Paul Oakenfold	-
J U N E	18	Degradation Trip	Jerry Cantrell	-
J U N E	18	The Essentials	Bananarama	Compilation
J U N E	18	Gravity	Our Lady Peace	-
J U N E	18	Hard Rock Bottom	No Use for a Name	-
J U N E	18	Live at the Temple Bar and More	Fishbone	Live
J U N E	18	lovehatetragedy	Papa Roach	-
J U N E	18	The Madness of the Crowds	Ace Troubleshooter	-
J U N E	18	Pop 'Til You Drop	A*Teens	-
J U N E	18	Readymades	Chumbawamba	-
J U N E	18	Universal Truths and Cycles	Guided by Voices	-
J U N E	18	All Access Europe	Eminem	Video
J U N E	19	Deep River	Hikaru Utada	-
J U N E	23	Born a Lion	Danko Jones	Debut
J U N E	24	Century Child	Nightwish	-
J U N E	24	Clubland – The Ride of Your Life	Clubland	Compilation
J U N E	24	Drink Me	Queenadreena	-
J U N E	24	Hunters and Prey	Angra	EP
J U N E	24	Visions from the Spiral Generator	Vintersorg	-
J U N E	25	3	Soulfly	-
J U N E	25	Born to Reign	Will Smith	-
J U N E	25	Cheer Up!	Reel Big Fish	-
J U N E	25	Coup de Grace	Orange Goblin	-
J U N E	25	Crucible	Halford	-
J U N E	25	Emergency Rations	Mr. Lif	-
J U N E	25	Get Ya Mind Correct	Chamillionaire & Paul Wall	-
J U N E	25	God's Favorite	N.O.R.E.	-
J U N E	25	In the Shadow of the Living Room	Reaching Quiet	Debut
J U N E	25	Kings of Pop	Home Grown	-
J U N E	25	Knock on the Sky	SHeDAISY	-
J U N E	25	Live at Budokan	Ozzy Osbourne	Live
J U N E	25	Murray Street	Sonic Youth	-
J U N E	25	My Love Is Rotten to the Core	Tim Hecker	-
J U N E	25	Play	Play	-
J U N E	25	Punk-O-Rama Vol. 7	Various Artists	Compilation
J U N E	25	Read & Burn 01	Wire	EP
J U N E	25	Soma Holiday	Greenwheel	-
J U N E	25	Songs About Jane	Maroon 5	Debut
J U N E	25	Strange Beautiful Music	Joe Satriani	-
J U N E	25	Today, Tomorrow, and Forever	Elvis Presley	-
J U N E	25	Truthfully Speaking	Truth Hurts	-
J U N E	25	The Used	The Used	Debut
J U N E	25	Vida Blue	Vida Blue	Debut
J U N E	28	Hollinndagain	Animal Collective	Live

=== July–September ===
Date		Album	Artist	Notes
J U L Y	1	Hullabaloo: Live at Le Zenith, Paris	Muse	Live video
J U L Y	1	2002 Warped Tour Compilation	Various Artists	Compilation
J U L Y	1	Heathen Chemistry	Oasis	-
J U L Y	1	Hullabaloo Soundtrack	Muse	Live / Compilation
J U L Y	2	21 Singles	The Jesus and Mary Chain	Compilation
J U L Y	2	Charango	Morcheeba	-
J U L Y	2	Classics Selected by Brian Wilson	The Beach Boys	Compilation
J U L Y	2	From Illmatic to Stillmatic: The Remixes	Nas	Remix EP
J U L Y	2	Irv Gotti Presents: The Inc.	Murder Inc. Records	Compilation
J U L Y	2	O, Yeah! Ultimate Aerosmith Hits	Aerosmith	Compilation
J U L Y	2	Shenanigans	Green Day	Compilation
J U L Y	2	Stash	Cypress Hill	EP
J U L Y	2	Steady as She Goes	Voodoo Glow Skulls	-
J U L Y	2	This Is the Remix	Jessica Simpson	Remix
J U L Y	2	The Ultimate Kansas	Kansas	Compilation
J U L Y	2	The Very Best of Chicago: Only the Beginning	Chicago	Compilation
J U L Y	2	Worship and Tribute	Glassjaw	-
J U L Y	3	Babylon	Skindred	Debut
J U L Y	3	Green	B'z	-
J U L Y	3	Jade-1	Jade Kwan	-
J U L Y	8	Dub Come Save Me	Roots Manuva	-
J U L Y	8	Greatest Hits	Space	Compilation
J U L Y	9	Angels Come on Time	The Slip	-
J U L Y	9	At the River's Edge: Live in St. Louis	Styx	Live
J U L Y	9	Bacdafucup Part II	Onyx	-
J U L Y	9	Bag of Hits	Fun Lovin' Criminals	Compilation
J U L Y	9	By the Way	Red Hot Chili Peppers	-
J U L Y	9	Fins to Make Us More Fish-Like	Liars	EP
J U L Y	9	A Gangster and a Gentleman	Styles P	-
J U L Y	9	Hard Candy	Counting Crows	-
J U L Y	9	A Jackknife to a Swan	The Mighty Mighty Bosstones	-
J U L Y	9	The Underdog EP	Yellowcard	EP
J U L Y	10	Parade of Chaos	Zao	-
J U L Y	16	Busted Stuff	Dave Matthews Band	-
J U L Y	16	Control	Pedro the Lion	-
J U L Y	16	Daybreaker	Beth Orton	-
J U L Y	16	Dreamland	Robert Plant	-
J U L Y	16	Headspace	Pulse Ultra	-
J U L Y	16	Highly Evolved	The Vines	-
J U L Y	16	I Miss My Friend	Darryl Worley	-
J U L Y	16	Kutless	Kutless	-
J U L Y	16	Live from New York City, 1967	Simon & Garfunkel	Live 1967
J U L Y	16	Want It	Buju Banton	Compilation
J U L Y	16	Yoshimi Battles the Pink Robots	The Flaming Lips	-
J U L Y	17	Welcome to Blue Island	Enuff Z'nuff	Japan
J U L Y	22	Now That's What I Call Music! 52 (U.K. series)	Various Artists	Compilation
J U L Y	23	500 Degreez	Lil Wayne	-
J U L Y	23	Bermuda Triangle	Buckethead	-
J U L Y	23	Community Service	The Crystal Method	-
J U L Y	23	Completely	Diamond Rio	-
J U L Y	23	Deadringer	RJD2	-
J U L Y	23	I Brought You My Bullets, You Brought Me Your Love	My Chemical Romance	Debut
J U L Y	23	Mack 10 Presents Da Hood	Da Hood	-
J U L Y	23	Man with a Memory	Joe Nichols	-
J U L Y	23	Now That's What I Call Music! 10 (U.S. series)	Various Artists	Compilation
J U L Y	23	Revolverlution	Public Enemy	-
J U L Y	23	Sink or Swim	The Waifs	US
J U L Y	26	The Coral	The Coral	-
J U L Y	29	Len Parrot's Memorial Lift	Baxter Dury	Debut
J U L Y	30	All I Have	Amerie	Debut
J U L Y	30	Alive!	Snot	Live
J U L Y	30	The Amalgamut	Filter	-
J U L Y	30	Back to Then	Darius Rucker	-
J U L Y	30	Brontosaurus	Da Vinci's Notebook	-
J U L Y	30	Concrete	Fear Factory	-
J U L Y	30	Faces & Names	Dave Pirner	-
J U L Y	30	Fashionably Late	Linda Thompson	-
J U L Y	30	Happenstance	Fozzy	-
J U L Y	30	In a Word: Yes (1969 – )	Yes	Box Set
J U L Y	30	Learning from Falling	Lamya	-
J U L Y	30	Reanimation	Linkin Park	Remix
J U L Y	30	The Rising	Bruce Springsteen	-
J U L Y	30	Songs for Survivors	Graham Nash	-
J U L Y	30	To Serve Man	Cattle Decapitation	-
A U G U S T	2	The Inhuman Condition	Sam Roberts	EP
A U G U S T	2	Inside Wants Out	John Mayer	EP Re-release
A U G U S T	3	Fue Por Ti	Ericson Alexander Molano	-
A U G U S T	5	Evil Heat	Primal Scream	-
A U G U S T	5	Surf	Roddy Frame	UK
A U G U S T	6	Attack of the Attacking Things	Jean Grae	Debut
A U G U S T	6	Drunk Enough to Dance	Bowling for Soup	-
A U G U S T	6	The Fix	Scarface	-
A U G U S T	6	From Filthy Tongue of Gods and Griots	Dälek	-
A U G U S T	6	Heaven	DJ Sammy	-
A U G U S T	6	King Biscuit Flower Hour Presents Ringo & His New All-Starr Band	Ringo Starr	Live
A U G U S T	6	Miss Fortune	Allison Moorer	-
A U G U S T	6	Movies for the Blind	Cage	Debut
A U G U S T	6	No Secrets	No Secrets	-
A U G U S T	6	Nothing	Meshuggah	-
A U G U S T	6	Thug Holiday	Trick Daddy	-
A U G U S T	6	Turbo	The Pietasters	-
A U G U S T	6	Unleashed	Toby Keith	-
A U G U S T	6	Whip It On	The Raveonettes	Debut EP
A U G U S T	6	Wishfire	The Crüxshadows	-
A U G U S T	8	The Charles C. Leary	Devendra Banhart	-
A U G U S T	10	Consider This	Aaron Pritchett	-
A U G U S T	11	Melody A.M.	Röyksopp	-
A U G U S T	12	Cool Summer Reggae	Aswad	-
A U G U S T	13	All the Time in the World	Jump5	-
A U G U S T	13	American Cheese	Nerf Herder	-
A U G U S T	13	At Sixes and Sevens	Sirenia	-
A U G U S T	13	Cherry Marmalade	Kay Hanley	-
A U G U S T	13	Gusto!	Guttermouth	-
A U G U S T	13	Lifted or The Story Is in the Soil, Keep Your Ear to the Ground	Bright Eyes	-
A U G U S T	13	Living Targets	Beatsteaks	-
A U G U S T	13	The Magnificent	DJ Jazzy Jeff	Debut
A U G U S T	13	The Mantle	Agalloch	-
A U G U S T	13	Minority of One	Dag Nasty	-
A U G U S T	13	October Road	James Taylor	-
A U G U S T	13	Rebirth	Keith Sweat	-
A U G U S T	13	This Side	Nickel Creek	-
A U G U S T	13	Trinity (Past, Present and Future)	Slum Village	-
A U G U S T	13	Vanity	Eighteen Visions	-
A U G U S T	13	Welcome to Discovery Park	Brad	-
A U G U S T	13	Wiretap Scars	Sparta	-
A U G U S T	13	X	Def Leppard	-
A U G U S T	15	We Will Be Dead Tomorrow	Raging Speedhorn	-
A U G U S T	16	Foretold in the Language of Dreams	Natacha Atlas & Marc Eagleton Project	-
A U G U S T	16	FZ:OZ	Frank Zappa	Live 1976
A U G U S T	19	Hometime	Alison Moyet	UK
A U G U S T	19	Sheer Hellish Miasma	Kevin Drumm	-
A U G U S T	19	Turn on the Bright Lights	Interpol	-
A U G U S T	20	Animal House	Angie Martinez	-
A U G U S T	20	Black Letter Days	Frank Black and the Catholics	-
A U G U S T	20	Blacklisted	Neko Case	-
A U G U S T	20	Damage Done	Dark Tranquillity	-
A U G U S T	20	Detox	Treble Charger	-
A U G U S T	20	Devil's Workshop	Frank Black and the Catholics	-
A U G U S T	20	Disclaimer	Seether	-
A U G U S T	20	Easy	Kelly Willis	-
A U G U S T	20	Eternal Youth	Future Bible Heroes	-
A U G U S T	20	Hijas del Tomate	Las Ketchup	-
A U G U S T	20	If It Was You	Tegan and Sara	-
A U G U S T	20	In Their Darkened Shrines	Nile	-
A U G U S T	20	Kill the Moonlight	Spoon	-
A U G U S T	20	Kidz Bop 2	Kidz Bop Kids	-
A U G U S T	20	Live	The Black Crowes	2xCD; Live
A U G U S T	20	Lord Willin'	Clipse	-
A U G U S T	20	My Fever Broke	Rasputina	EP
A U G U S T	20	One Beat	Sleater-Kinney	-
A U G U S T	20	Past Lives	Black Sabbath	Live Compilation
A U G U S T	20	Silence	Blindside	-
A U G U S T	20	Since We've Become Translucent	Mudhoney	-
A U G U S T	20	Something Worth Leaving Behind	Lee Ann Womack	-
A U G U S T	20	Tropical Storm	Beenie Man	-
A U G U S T	20	Waking the Dead	L.A. Guns	-
A U G U S T	21	II	Hardline	Japanese release date
A U G U S T	24	Room to Beathe	Delbert McClinton	-
A U G U S T	26	Angels with Dirty Faces	Sugababes	-
A U G U S T	26	Expanding Senses	Darkane	Europe
A U G U S T	26	A Rush of Blood to the Head	Coldplay	-
A U G U S T	27	30 Seconds to Mars	Thirty Seconds to Mars	-
A U G U S T	27	Again, for the First Time	Bleach	-
A U G U S T	27	Daylight	Duncan Sheik	-
A U G U S T	27	Diamond Princess	Trina	-
A U G U S T	27	Eve-Olution	Eve	-
A U G U S T	27	Gotta Get Thru This	Daniel Bedingfield	-
A U G U S T	27	Home	The Chicks	-
A U G U S T	27	Into Your Head	BBMak	-
A U G U S T	27	Irony Is a Dead Scene	The Dillinger Escape Plan with Mike Patton	EP
A U G U S T	27	Johnny Cash at Madison Square Garden	Johnny Cash	Live
A U G U S T	27	Just Tryin' Ta Live	Devin the Dude	-
A U G U S T	27	Lost in Space	Aimee Mann	-
A U G U S T	27	Mind Elevation	Nightmares on Wax	-
A U G U S T	27	The Mix Tape	KRS-One	Compilation
A U G U S T	27	Monsters, Inc. Scream Factory Favorites	Riders in the Sky	-
A U G U S T	27	My Town	Montgomery Gentry	-
A U G U S T	27	No Stranger to Shame	Uncle Kracker	-
A U G U S T	27	The N.W.A Legacy, Vol. 2	N.W.A	Compilation
A U G U S T	27	Outrospective / Reperspective	Faithless	-
A U G U S T	27	Saturate	Breaking Benjamin	Debut
A U G U S T	27	Snow	Spock's Beard	-
A U G U S T	27	Songs for the Deaf	Queens of the Stone Age	-
A U G U S T	27	Stone Sour	Stone Sour	-
A U G U S T	27	Undaground Legend	Lil' Flip	Debut
A U G U S T	27	Unlimited EP	Soul Position	EP
A U G U S T	30	Meant to Be	Selwyn	-
S E P T E M B E R	1	This Never Ending Now	The Chameleons	-
S E P T E M B E R	2	Beginner's Luck	Cowboy Troy	-
S E P T E M B E R	2	Critical Mass	Threshold	-
S E P T E M B E R	2	Mastered by Guy at The Exchange	Max Tundra	
S E P T E M B E R	2	The Music	The Music	UK
S E P T E M B E R	3	Another Earthquake	Aaron Carter	-
S E P T E M B E R	3	BYO Split Series, Vol. 4	Anti-Flag/The Bouncing Souls	Split Album
S E P T E M B E R	3	Reroute to Remain	In Flames	-
S E P T E M B E R	3	Sadness Will Prevail	Today Is the Day	-
S E P T E M B E R	3	Sharks	UFO	-
S E P T E M B E R	3	UltraSex	Mount Sims	-
S E P T E M B E R	4	Biosphere	Loudness	-
S E P T E M B E R	4	The Message at the Depth	DJ Krush	Japan
S E P T E M B E R	5	The Heat of Balkan Gypsy Soul	Ferus Mustafov	
S E P T E M B E R	9	Feels So Good	Atomic Kitten	-
S E P T E M B E R	9	Intergalactic Sonic 7″s	Ash	Compilation
S E P T E M B E R	10	4NYC	Jordan Rudess	-
S E P T E M B E R	10	Cross Canadian Ragweed	Cross Canadian Ragweed	Debut
S E P T E M B E R	10	Elastic	Joshua Redman	-
S E P T E M B E R	10	Even Closer	Goapele	-
S E P T E M B E R	10	Golden Grain	Disturbing tha Peace	-
S E P T E M B E R	10	Greatest Hits	Run-D.M.C.	Compilation
S E P T E M B E R	10	Illumination	Paul Weller	-
S E P T E M B E R	10	Live for Today	Boysetsfire	-
S E P T E M B E R	10	Live on St. Patrick's Day From Boston, MA	Dropkick Murphys	Live
S E P T E M B E R	10	Paradise	Kenny G	-
S E P T E M B E R	10	Roger Miret and the Disasters	Roger Miret and the Disasters	-
S E P T E M B E R	10	Scars	Gary Moore	-
S E P T E M B E R	10	Sleepless	Peter Wolf	-
S E P T E M B E R	10	So Much Shouting, So Much Laughter	Ani DiFranco	Live
S E P T E M B E R	10	Still, Alive... and Well?	Megadeth	Compilation
S E P T E M B E R	10	To Welcome the Fade	Novembers Doom	-
S E P T E M B E R	10	Warts and All: Volume 2	Moe	Live
S E P T E M B E R	11	All Eyez on Me	Monica	-
S E P T E M B E R	13	Jade-1 Special Edition	Jade Kwan	-
S E P T E M B E R	16	The No Music	Themselves	-
S E P T E M B E R	16	Scorpio Rising	Death in Vegas	-
S E P T E M B E R	17	The Art of Balance	Shadows Fall	-
S E P T E M B E R	17	Believe	Disturbed	-
S E P T E M B E R	17	Dial-A-Song: 20 Years of They Might Be Giants	They Might Be Giants	Compilation
S E P T E M B E R	17	Faces Down	Sondre Lerche	Debut
S E P T E M B E R	17	Heavy Traffic	Status Quo	-
S E P T E M B E R	17	How Sweet it Is	Joan Osborne	-
S E P T E M B E R	17	Internet Dating Superstuds	The Vandals	-
S E P T E M B E R	17	I Phantom	Mr. Lif	Debut
S E P T E M B E R	17	Light & Magic	Ladytron	-
S E P T E M B E R	17	Oceanic	Isis	-
S E P T E M B E R	17	OK Go	OK Go	Debut
S E P T E M B E R	17	Quizas	Enrique Iglesias	-
S E P T E M B E R	17	Rainy Day Assembly	Tess Wiley	-
S E P T E M B E R	17	The Richest Man in Babylon	Thievery Corporation	-
S E P T E M B E R	17	Stanley Climbfall	Lifehouse	-
S E P T E M B E R	17	Theory of a Deadman	Theory of a Deadman	Debut
S E P T E M B E R	17	Whole Numbers Play the Basics	Casino Versus Japan	
S E P T E M B E R	18	By the Grace of God	The Hellacopters	-
S E P T E M B E R	19	Unity Roots and Family, Away	Glay	-
S E P T E M B E R	22	Bloodred Hatred	Hatesphere	-
S E P T E M B E R	23	20 Years of Dischord	Various Artists	Dischord Records Box Set
S E P T E M B E R	23	Another Late Night: Tommy Guerrero	Tommy Guerrero	Compilation
S E P T E M B E R	23	When the Roses Bloom Again	Laura Cantrell	-
S E P T E M B E R	24	Almost an Island	Wolfstone	-
S E P T E M B E R	24	Craveman	Ted Nugent	-
S E P T E M B E R	24	The Creek Drank the Cradle	Iron & Wine	-
S E P T E M B E R	24	Demolition	Ryan Adams	Demos
S E P T E M B E R	24	ELV1S: 30 #1 HITS	Elvis Presley	Compilation
S E P T E M B E R	24	Head on Straight	Tonic	-
S E P T E M B E R	24	The Headphone Masterpiece	Cody Chesnutt	-
S E P T E M B E R	24	A Hundred Days Off	Underworld	-
S E P T E M B E R	24	In Absentia	Porcupine Tree	-
S E P T E M B E R	24	Infiltrate Destroy Rebuild	CKY	-
S E P T E M B E R	24	The Instigator	Rhett Miller	-
S E P T E M B E R	24	Jerusalem	Steve Earle	-
S E P T E M B E R	24	Light a Match, For I Deserve to Burn	The Beautiful Mistake	-
S E P T E M B E R	24	The Lion and the Witch	Weezer	Live EP
S E P T E M B E R	24	The Lost Tapes	Nas	Compilation
S E P T E M B E R	24	The Naked Ride Home	Jackson Browne	-
S E P T E M B E R	24	Newsboys Remixed	Newsboys	Remix
S E P T E M B E R	24	Purple Onion	Colonel Les Claypool's Fearless Flying Frog Brigade	-
S E P T E M B E R	24	Redemption	Benzino	-
S E P T E M B E R	24	Sea Change	Beck	-
S E P T E M B E R	24	Side Hustles	UGK	-
S E P T E M B E R	24	Stay	Jeremy Camp	-
S E P T E M B E R	24	Strong Enough	Travis Tritt	-
S E P T E M B E R	24	Under a Pale Grey Sky	Sepultura	Live
S E P T E M B E R	24	Up	Peter Gabriel	-
S E P T E M B E R	24	Voyage to India	India Arie	-
S E P T E M B E R	24	Winter Marquee	Nanci Griffith	-
S E P T E M B E R	30	Busted	Busted	-
S E P T E M B E R	30	Do You Know Squarepusher	Squarepusher	-
S E P T E M B E R	30	Forty Licks	The Rolling Stones	Compilation
S E P T E M B E R	30	Life on Other Planets	Supergrass	-
S E P T E M B E R	30	Live in Midgård	Therion	Live
S E P T E M B E R	30	A New Morning	Suede	-
S E P T E M B E R	30	The Outer Marker	Just Jack	-
S E P T E M B E R	30	The Ragpicker's Dream	Mark Knopfler	-
S E P T E M B E R	?	Beaches & Canyons	Black Dice	Debut
S E P T E M B E R	?	House Arrest	Ariel Pink	-

=== October–December ===
Date		Album	Artist	Notes
O C T O B E R	1	Before the Backstreet Boys 1989–1993	Nick Carter	Compilation
O C T O B E R	1	The Complete Singles Collection 1994-2000	The Unseen	Compilation
O C T O B E R	1	Cruel Smile	Elvis Costello and the Imposters	-
O C T O B E R	1	Downthesun	Downthesun	-
O C T O B E R	1	Everybody Makes Mistakes	Shearwater	-
O C T O B E R	1	The Execution of All Things	Rilo Kiley	-
O C T O B E R	1	Floetic	Floetry	-
O C T O B E R	1	Live in Paris	Diana Krall	Live
O C T O B E R	1	Man Vs. Machine	Xzibit	-
O C T O B E R	1	Read & Burn 02	Wire	EP
O C T O B E R	1	To Live and Die in CA	Daz Dillinger	-
O C T O B E R	1	To Understand: The Early Recordings of Matthew Sweet	Matthew Sweet	Compilation
O C T O B E R	1	Tuxicity	Richard Cheese and Lounge Against the Machine	-
O C T O B E R	1	Twisted Angel	LeAnn Rimes	-
O C T O B E R	1	The Young and the Hopeless	Good Charlotte	-
O C T O B E R	2	Consumed by Your Poison	Despised Icon	-
O C T O B E R	2	One Step More and You Die	Mono	-
O C T O B E R	7	Entering the Spectra	Karmakanic	-
O C T O B E R	7	Finisterre	Saint Etienne	-
O C T O B E R	8	Alienating Our Audience	Mindless Self Indulgence	Live
O C T O B E R	8	Amore del Tropico	The Black Heart Procession	-
O C T O B E R	8	The Bad, the Worse, and the Out of Print	The Bouncing Souls	Compilation
O C T O B E R	8	BareNaked	Jennifer Love Hewitt	-
O C T O B E R	8	Ben Folds Live	Ben Folds	Live
O C T O B E R	8	Bounce	Bon Jovi	-
O C T O B E R	8	Caution	Hot Water Music	-
O C T O B E R	8	The Chosen Few	Boot Camp Clik	-
O C T O B E R	8	Clone	Leo Kottke & Mike Gordon	-
O C T O B E R	8	Comalies	Lacuna Coil	-
O C T O B E R	8	Cruelty Without Beauty	Soft Cell	-
O C T O B E R	8	Dangerous Connection	7L & Esoteric	-
O C T O B E R	8	Device, Voice, Drum	Kansas	Live
O C T O B E R	8	Early Years	Tiger Army	EP
O C T O B E R	8	El Cielo	dredg	-
O C T O B E R	8	Electric Tears	Buckethead	-
O C T O B E R	8	1st Class	Large Professor	-
O C T O B E R	8	Fuck the System	The Exploited	-
O C T O B E R	8	Golden Road	Keith Urban	-
O C T O B E R	8	Happy With What You Have to Be Happy With	King Crimson	EP
O C T O B E R	8	It Won't Be Christmas Without You	Brooks & Dunn	Christmas
O C T O B E R	8	Jingle All the Way	Crash Test Dummies	Christmas
O C T O B E R	8	Kings of Crunk	Lil Jon & the Eastside Boyz	-
O C T O B E R	8	The Last DJ	Tom Petty and the Heartbreakers	-
O C T O B E R	8	Lost Horizons	Lemon Jelly	-
O C T O B E R	8	Make Up the Breakdown	Hot Hot Heat	Debut
O C T O B E R	8	Mis Boleros Favoritos	Luis Miguel	Compilation
O C T O B E R	8	Not 4 Sale	Sammy Hagar and The Waboritas	-
O C T O B E R	8	Pictures	John Michael Montgomery	-
O C T O B E R	8	Power in Numbers	Jurassic 5	-
O C T O B E R	8	Rise Above: 24 Black Flag Songs to Benefit the West Memphis Three	Rollins Band	Covers album
O C T O B E R	8	Rollin' Stoned	Kottonmouth Kings	-
O C T O B E R	8	Sean-Nós Nua	Sinéad O'Connor	Traditional Irish songs
O C T O B E R	8	Statues	Moloko	-
O C T O B E R	8	Step Off	ESG	-
O C T O B E R	8	This Is Who I Am	Heather Headley	Debut
O C T O B E R	8	Wonder What's Next	Chevelle	-
O C T O B E R	8	Velocity of Sound	The Apples in Stereo	-
O C T O B E R	9	Overload	Anthem	-
O C T O B E R	11	Being Out Rocks	Various Artists	Compilation
O C T O B E R	11	I to Sky	JJ72	-
O C T O B E R	14	Footprints	Holly Valance	-
O C T O B E R	14	Hate	The Delgados	-
O C T O B E R	14	Out from Out Where	Amon Tobin	-
O C T O B E R	14	Up the Bracket	The Libertines	-
O C T O B E R	15	10	LL Cool J	-
O C T O B E R	15	The All-American Rejects	The All-American Rejects	Doghouse release
O C T O B E R	15	Attack!!	Yngwie J. Malmsteen	-
O C T O B E R	15	A Beautiful World	Robin Thicke	Debut
O C T O B E R	15	Cry	Faith Hill	Hill's third consecutive album to reach no. 1
O C T O B E R	15	Heavy Metal Thunder	Saxon	-
O C T O B E R	15	Let It Rain	Tracy Chapman	-
O C T O B E R	15	Lost Time	12 Rods	-
O C T O B E R	15	Paullelujah!	MC Paul Barman	-
O C T O B E R	15	Perfecting Loneliness	Jets to Brazil	-
O C T O B E R	15	Santa Claus Lane	Hilary Duff	Christmas; Debut
O C T O B E R	15	Red Hot + Riot: The Music and Spirit of Fela Kuti	Various Artists	Red Hot Benefit Series
O C T O B E R	15	Waiting for My Rocket to Come	Jason Mraz	Debut
O C T O B E R	15	Welcome	Taproot	-
O C T O B E R	15	You Forgot It in People	Broken Social Scene	-
O C T O B E R	20	Slanted and Enchanted: Luxe & Reduxe	Pavement	Compilation
O C T O B E R	21	Comfort In Sound	Feeder	-
O C T O B E R	21	Human Conditions	Richard Ashcroft	-
O C T O B E R	21	The Kiss of Morning	Graham Coxon	-
O C T O B E R	21	Loud Like Nature	Add N to (X)	-
O C T O B E R	21	Our House: the Original Songs	Madness	Compilation
O C T O B E R	21	Trust	Low	-
O C T O B E R	21	Unity	Rage	-
O C T O B E R	22	Best of Bowie	David Bowie	Compilation
O C T O B E R	22	Christmas Is Almost Here	Carly Simon	Christmas
O C T O B E R	22	Dancing Down the Stony Road	Chris Rea	-
O C T O B E R	22	Demon Hunter	Demon Hunter	-
O C T O B E R	22	The Essential Leonard Cohen	Leonard Cohen	Compilation
O C T O B E R	22	Garfield	Adam Green	-
O C T O B E R	22	A Girl Can Mack	3LW	-
O C T O B E R	22	Is This Thing Loaded?	Northstar	-
O C T O B E R	22	It Had to Be You: The Great American Songbook	Rod Stewart	Covers
O C T O B E R	22	Live at Maxwell's	Imperial Teen	Live
O C T O B E R	22	Live from Camp X-Ray	Rocket from the Crypt	-
O C T O B E R	22	Neva Surrenda	Outlawz	-
O C T O B E R	22	New Earth Mud	Chris Robinson	-
O C T O B E R	22	One by One	Foo Fighters	-
O C T O B E R	22	Order of the Leech	Napalm Death	-
O C T O B E R	22	Save Rock 'n' Roll	The Flaming Sideburns	-
O C T O B E R	22	Shaman	Santana	-
O C T O B E R	22	Some Things	Lasgo	-
O C T O B E R	22	Spend the Night	The Donnas	-
O C T O B E R	22	Symptom of the Universe: The Original Black Sabbath 1970-1978	Black Sabbath	Compilation
O C T O B E R	22	Transplants	Transplants	-
O C T O B E R	22	Under and In	Glifted	-
O C T O B E R	22	Wishes: A Holiday Album	Kenny G	Holiday
O C T O B E R	22	Worship Again	Michael W. Smith	Live
O C T O B E R	22	Zos Kia Cultus (Here and Beyond)	Behemoth	-
O C T O B E R	26	Present	Killing Heidi	-
O C T O B E R	28	( )	Sigur Rós	-
O C T O B E R	28	Crimson Thunder	HammerFall	-
O C T O B E R	28	Dancehall Places	Mint Royale	-
O C T O B E R	28	Enjoy the Moment	Randy Napoleon	-
O C T O B E R	28	Forever Delayed	Manic Street Preachers	Compilation
O C T O B E R	28	Heart and Soul - 13 Rock Classics	Bonnie Tyler	-
O C T O B E R	28	Hooverphonic Presents Jackie Cane	Hooverphonic	-
O C T O B E R	28	A New Day at Midnight	David Gray	-
O C T O B E R	28	Now or Never	Nick Carter	-
O C T O B E R	28	Oh Me Oh My	Devendra Banhart	-
O C T O B E R	28	Out of Season	Beth Gibbons and Rustin Man	-
O C T O B E R	28	Scarlet's Walk	Tori Amos	-
O C T O B E R	28	Simply Deep	Kelly Rowland	Debut
O C T O B E R	28	Unholy Cult	Immolation	-
O C T O B E R	29	Da Capo	Ace of Base	-
O C T O B E R	29	Divine Discontent	Sixpence None the Richer	-
O C T O B E R	29	Guns, God and Government	Marilyn Manson	Video
O C T O B E R	29	Liza's Back	Liza Minnelli	Live
O C T O B E R	29	Lucky Day	Shaggy	-
O C T O B E R	29	Melt	Rascal Flatts	-
O C T O B E R	29	The Metal Opera Part II	Avantasia	-
O C T O B E R	29	8 Mile: Music from and Inspired by the Motion Picture	Various artists	Soundtrack
O C T O B E R	29	Nirvana	Nirvana	Compilation
O C T O B E R	29	Pistols at Dawn	Consumed	-
O C T O B E R	29	Santa Hooked Me Up	B2K	Christmas
O C T O B E R	29	The Season for Romance	Lee Ann Womack	-
O C T O B E R	29	Stripped	Christina Aguilera	-
O C T O B E R	29	Thug World Order	Bone Thugs-N-Harmony	-
O C T O B E R	30	Shawn Desman	Shawn Desman	Debut
O C T O B E R	31	Alexisonfire	Alexisonfire	Canada
O C T O B E R	31	Something Good Is Going to Happen to You	Baboon	-
O C T O B E R	31	Season's Greetings from Moe	Moe	Christmas
N O V E M B E R	1	The End of the Beginning	God Is an Astronaut	-
N O V E M B E R	2	Live at Folsom Field, Boulder, Colorado	Dave Matthews Band	Live
N O V E M B E R	4	The Ballad Hits	Roxette	Compilation
N O V E M B E R	4	Eddie's Archive	Iron Maiden	Box Set
N O V E M B E R	4	Family Tree	Björk	Box Set
N O V E M B E R	4	Greatest Hits	Björk	Compilation
N O V E M B E R	4	À la vie, à la mort !	Johnny Hallyday	Double album
N O V E M B E R	4	One Love	Blue	-
N O V E M B E R	4	Submers	Loscil	
N O V E M B E R	4	Yanqui U.X.O.	Godspeed You! Black Emperor	-
N O V E M B E R	5	American IV: The Man Comes Around	Johnny Cash	-
N O V E M B E R	5	Anthology	Carly Simon	Compilation
N O V E M B E R	5	The Best of 1990–2000	U2	Compilation +2 new tracks
N O V E M B E R	5	Corporate America	Boston	-
N O V E M B E R	5	Corridos de Muerte	Asesino	-
N O V E M B E R	5	Edward the Great	Iron Maiden	Compilation
N O V E M B E R	5	Grandes Éxitos	Shakira	Compilation
N O V E M B E R	5	Have You Fed the Fish?	Badly Drawn Boy	-
N O V E M B E R	5	Justified	Justin Timberlake	Debut
N O V E M B E R	5	Live	Alison Krauss	Live
N O V E M B E R	5	Live at the Rams Head	Little Feat	Live
N O V E M B E R	5	Machine	Yeah Yeah Yeahs	EP
N O V E M B E R	5	Maybe This Christmas	Various artists	Compilation
N O V E M B E R	5	The Morning After	Deborah Cox	-
N O V E M B E R	5	The Odyssey	Symphony X	-
N O V E M B E R	5	One More Car, One More Rider	Eric Clapton	Live
N O V E M B E R	5	Phoenix	The Warlocks	-
N O V E M B E R	5	Punishment in Capitals	Napalm Death	Live
N O V E M B E R	5	Red Letter Days	The Wallflowers	-
N O V E M B E R	5	Stars: The Best of 1992–2002	The Cranberries	Compilation
N O V E M B E R	5	Still Ghetto	Jaheim	-
N O V E M B E R	5	Tallahassee	The Mountain Goats	-
N O V E M B E R	5	Trapt	Trapt	-
N O V E M B E R	5	Unfold the Future	The Flower Kings	-
N O V E M B E R	5	We Are Science	Dot Allison	-
N O V E M B E R	5	The Will to Kill	Malevolent Creation	-
N O V E M B E R	5	A Wonderful World	Tony Bennett and k.d. lang	-
N O V E M B E R	5	The Wraith: Shangri-La	Insane Clown Posse	-
N O V E M B E R	11	Back in the U.S.	Paul McCartney	2xCD + DVD; Live
N O V E M B E R	11	Felt: A Tribute to Christina Ricci	Felt	-
N O V E M B E R	11	Unbreakable – The Greatest Hits Vol. 1	Westlife	Compilation
N O V E M B E R	12	3D	TLC	-
N O V E M B E R	12	Away from the Sun	3 Doors Down	-
N O V E M B E R	12	Back Into Your System	Saliva	-
N O V E M B E R	12	The Best of Siouxsie & the Banshees	Siouxsie and the Banshees	Compilation
N O V E M B E R	12	The Blueprint 2: The Gift & The Curse	Jay-Z	-
N O V E M B E R	12	A Christmas Gift of Love	Barry Manilow	Christmas album
N O V E M B E R	12	Darkhorse	Crazy Town	-
N O V E M B E R	12	Deliverance	Opeth	-
N O V E M B E R	12	Dutty Rock	Sean Paul	-
N O V E M B E R	12	Greatest Hits 1970-2002	Elton John	Compilation
N O V E M B E R	12	Loose Screw	The Pretenders	-
N O V E M B E R	12	Loyalty	Fat Joe	-
N O V E M B E R	12	Miaskovsky: Symphony No. 6	Gothenburg Symphony Orchestra	-
N O V E M B E R	12	Monsters in the Closet	Swollen Members	-
N O V E M B E R	12	Resurrection Through Carnage	Bloodbath	-
N O V E M B E R	12	Riot Act	Pearl Jam	-
N O V E M B E R	12	So Happily Unsatisfied	Nine Days	-
N O V E M B E R	12	Symbol of Life	Paradise Lost	-
N O V E M B E R	12	Testify	Phil Collins	-
N O V E M B E R	12	Tribute to the Gods	Iced Earth	Covers album
N O V E M B E R	12	Under Construction	Missy Elliott	-
N O V E M B E R	14	Folk the World Tour	Flight of the Conchords	Live, debut
N O V E M B E R	18	KylieFever2002: Live in Manchester	Kylie Minogue	Video
N O V E M B E R	18	Another You Another Me	H & Claire	Debut
N O V E M B E R	18	Brainwashed	George Harrison	-
N O V E M B E R	18	Escapology	Robbie Williams	-
N O V E M B E R	18	Fatal	Hussein Fatal	-
N O V E M B E R	18	Live	Running Wild	Live
N O V E M B E R	18	Lovebox	Groove Armada	-
N O V E M B E R	18	More Than a Woman	Toni Braxton	-
N O V E M B E R	18	Nordland I	Bathory	-
N O V E M B E R	18	Organik Remixes	Robert Miles	Remix
N O V E M B E R	19	Audioslave	Audioslave	Debut
N O V E M B E R	19	Chicago: Music from the Miramax Motion Picture	Various Artists	Soundtrack
N O V E M B E R	19	The End of All Things to Come	Mudvayne	-
N O V E M B E R	19	Game	KHM	-
N O V E M B E R	19	Gone Wanderin'	Jackie Greene	Debut
N O V E M B E R	19	Greatest Hits	Geto Boys	-
N O V E M B E R	19	Highly Refined Pirates	Minus the Bear	Debut
N O V E M B E R	19	Last Temptation	Ja Rule	-
N O V E M B E R	19	Live	Korn	Video
N O V E M B E R	19	Mic Club: The Curriculum	Canibus	-
N O V E M B E R	19	More Than You Think You Are	Matchbox Twenty	-
N O V E M B E R	19	Quality	Talib Kweli	Debut
N O V E M B E R	19	Runaway Train	Oleander	EP
N O V E M B E R	19	Safe	Kittie	EP
N O V E M B E R	19	Slicker Than Your Average	Craig David	-
N O V E M B E R	19	Travelogue	Joni Mitchell	-
N O V E M B E R	19	Up!	Shania Twain	-
N O V E M B E R	19	Wait for Me	Susan Tedeschi	-
N O V E M B E R	23	Naughty or Nice	3LW	-
N O V E M B E R	25	The Last Dance	Steps	Compilation
N O V E M B E R	25	Seeing Double	S Club	-
N O V E M B E R	26	Better Dayz	2Pac	-
N O V E M B E R	26	Birdman	Birdman	Debut
N O V E M B E R	26	The Bootleg Series Vol. 5: Bob Dylan Live 1975, The Rolling Thunder Revue	Bob Dylan	Live 1975
N O V E M B E R	26	Burned Alive by Time	Evergreen Terrace	-
N O V E M B E R	26	Chapter 2: The Voice	Syleena Johnson	-
N O V E M B E R	26	Degradation Trip Volumes 1 & 2	Jerry Cantrell	-
N O V E M B E R	26	Does This Look Infected?	Sum 41	-
N O V E M B E R	26	Dru World Order	Dru Hill	-
N O V E M B E R	26	Duets	Barbra Streisand	Compilation
N O V E M B E R	26	Emotional	K-Ci and JoJo	-
N O V E M B E R	26	Encore	Lionel Richie	Live
N O V E M B E R	26	Good Timin': Live at Knebworth England 1980	The Beach Boys	Live 1980
N O V E M B E R	26	Greatest Hits	Will Smith	Compilation
N O V E M B E R	26	I & I Survived	Bad Brains	-
N O V E M B E R	26	It Ain't Safe No More	Busta Rhymes	-
N O V E M B E R	26	Lil' Beethoven	Sparks	-
N O V E M B E R	26	Lyckantropen Themes	Ulver	Soundtrack
N O V E M B E R	26	Nighthawks	Nighthawks	-
N O V E M B E R	26	Paid tha Cost to Be da Boss	Snoop Dogg	-
N O V E M B E R	26	Phrenology	The Roots	-
N O V E M B E R	26	Red 13	Journey	EP
N O V E M B E R	26	Shut Up	Kelly Osbourne	-
N O V E M B E R	26	Steal This Album!	System of a Down	-
N O V E M B E R	26	This Is Me... Then	Jennifer Lopez	US
N O V E M B E R	26	Tim McGraw and the Dancehall Doctors	Tim McGraw	-
N O V E M B E R	27	Population 1	Population 1	-
N O V E M B E R	27	Step into My Heart	immi	-
N O V E M B E R	29	Skylarkin'	Mic Christopher	-
N O V E M B E R	29	Synchronized	Sheavy	-
N O V E M B E R	29	Twelve Shots on the Rocks	Hanoi Rocks	-
N O V E M B E R	?	The Slackers and Friends	The Slackers	-
D E C E M B E R	1	DJ-Kicks: Tiga	Tiga	-
D E C E M B E R	1	El Sello De Los Tiempos	WarCry	-
D E C E M B E R	2	Dive In	Darius	Debut
D E C E M B E R	2	Goodnight Sun	Mike Farris	-
D E C E M B E R	3	Charmbracelet	Mariah Carey	-
D E C E M B E R	6	Breaking Up Gray Skies	Zayra Alvarez	-
D E C E M B E R	6	Taking the Lead	Elias Viljanen	-
D E C E M B E R	9	Cold Black Piece of Flesh	Sacrificium	-
D E C E M B E R	9	Makowiecki Band	Tomasz Makowiecki	-
D E C E M B E R	10	200 km/h in the Wrong Lane	t.A.T.u.	-
D E C E M B E R	10	Electric Circus	Common	-
D E C E M B E R	10	Feast on Scraps	Alanis Morissette	Live DVD
D E C E M B E R	10	I Care 4 U	Aaliyah	Compilation
D E C E M B E R	10	Just Whitney	Whitney Houston	-
D E C E M B E R	10	Legend of the Liquid Sword	GZA	-
D E C E M B E R	10	Naughty or Nice	3LW	Christmas
D E C E M B E R	10	Pandemonium!	B2K	-
D E C E M B E R	10	Round Room	Phish	-
D E C E M B E R	11	The Ballads: Love & B'z	B'z	Compilation
D E C E M B E R	11	Radio Caroline Vol.1	Miss Kittin	Compilation
D E C E M B E R	11	Sugar High	Chihiro Onitsuka	-
D E C E M B E R	13	God's Son	Nas	-
D E C E M B E R	13	Glam-rök	Fireflight	-
D E C E M B E R	13	Teraz wiem	Szymon Wydra	-
D E C E M B E R	16	Chloë	Chloë Agnew	Debut
D E C E M B E R	16	Pop*Porn	Libido	-
D E C E M B E R	17	Camden Underworld, London – 16 November 2001	As Friends Rust / Strike Anywhere	Live video
D E C E M B E R	17	Don't Stop Movin'	S Club	-
D E C E M B E R	17	Game Time	Lil' Romeo	-
D E C E M B E R	17	I Wanna Go There	Tyrese	-
D E C E M B E R	17	MTV Unplugged 2.0	Dashboard Confessional	Live
D E C E M B E R	17	The Next Episode	Next	-
D E C E M B E R	18	Rainbow	Ayumi Hamasaki	-
D E C E M B E R	20	Gecko Stroll	Will Pan	-
D E C E M B E R	20	Jade-2	Jade Kwan	-
D E C E M B E R	24	The Genesis	Yngwie Malmsteen	-
D E C E M B E R	24	What If It All Means Something	Chantal Kreviazuk	Canada
D E C E M B E R	26	Solo Star	Solange	-
D E C E M B E R	27	I Am the Movie	Motion City Soundtrack	Self-released release
D E C E M B E R	31	Revenge Is My Name	Iron Mask	-

=== Release date unknown ===
- Asobi Seksu – Asobi Seksu
- Be Still – Donna Lewis
- Guitar Player – Hank Marvin
- Heart and Crime – Julie Doiron
- American Whip – Joy Zipper
- Lovesick, Broke and Driftin' – Hank Williams III
- OOOH! (Out of Our Heads) – The Mekons
- Optometry – DJ Spooky
- Peace On Earth – Johnny Maestro & the Brooklyn Bridge
- Purely Evil – The Rogers Sisters
- The Slackers and Friends - The Slackers
- The Sounds of the Sounds of Science – Yo La Tengo
- St. Arkansas – Pere Ubu
- Steam Powered Aereo-Takes – John Hartford

== Popular songs ==
- "'03 Bonnie & Clyde" – Jay-Z featuring Beyoncé
- "Addictive" – Truth Hurts feat. Rakim
- "Aerials" – System of a Down
- "Ain't It Funny (Murder Remix)" – Jennifer Lopez featuring Ja Rule and Caddillac Tah
- "All I Have" – Jennifer Lopez featuring LL Cool J
- "All My Life" – Foo Fighters
- "All the Things She Said" – t.A.T.u.
- "All You Wanted" – Michelle Branch
- "Always On Time" – Ja Rule featuring Ashanti
- "Are You In?" – Incubus
- "Amber" – 311
- "Aserejé" – Monkey Circus
- "Beautiful" – Christina Aguilera
- "Blurry" – Puddle of Mudd
- "Born to Try" – Delta Goodrem
- "Boom" – P.O.D.
- "Bop Bop Baby" – Westlife (UK)
- "Boys" – Britney Spears featuring Pharrell Williams
- "Break Ya Neck" – Busta Rhymes
- "Buried Myself Alive" – The Used
- "By the Way" – Red Hot Chili Peppers
- "Can't Get You Out of My Head" – Kylie Minogue
- "Can't Stop" – Red Hot Chili Peppers
- "Cherry Lips (Go Baby Go!)" – Garbage
- "Cleanin' Out My Closet" – Eminem
- "Cochise" – Audioslave
- "Come into My World" – Kylie Minogue
- "Complicated" – Avril Lavigne
- "Crawling in the Dark" – Hoobastank
- "Days Go By" – Dirty Vegas
- "Dead Leaves and the Dirty Ground" – The White Stripes
- "Defy You" – The Offspring
- "Désenchantée" – Kate Ryan
- "Die Another Day" – Madonna
- "Dilemma" – Nelly featuring Kelly Rowland
- "Dirrty" – Christina Aguilera featuring Redman
- "Disease" – Matchbox Twenty
- "Do You Realize??" – The Flaming Lips
- "Don't Let Me Get Me" – Pink
- "Don't Stop" – The Rolling Stones
- "Don't You Want Me" – Alcazar
- "Downfall" – Trust Company
- "Electrical Storm" – U2
- "Emily" – Bowling for Soup
- "Epiphany" – Staind
- "Escape" – Enrique Iglesias
- "Everyday" – Bon Jovi
- "Everything" – M2M
- "Feel" – Robbie Williams
- "Fell in Love with a Girl" – The White Stripes
- "First Date" – Blink-182
- "Flowers in the Window" – Travis
- "Foolish" – Ashanti
- "For You" – Staind
- "Full Moon" – Brandy
- "The Game of Love" – Santana ft. Michelle Branch
- "Gangsta Lovin'" – Eve featuring Alicia Keys
- "Get Over You" – Sophie Ellis-Bextor
- "Get the Party Started" – Pink
- "Gimme! Gimme! Gimme! (A Man After Midnight)" – Star Academy France
- "Girl All the Bad Guys Want" – Bowling for Soup
- "Girl Talk" – TLC
- "Girlfriend" – 'N Sync featuring Nelly
- "Goodbye to You" – Michelle Branch
- "Good Times" – Styles P
- "Grace" – Supergrass
- "Handle This" – Sum 41
- "Hands Clean" – Alanis Morissette
- "Head On Collision" – New Found Glory
- "Headstrong" – Trapt
- "Hearts on Fire" – HammerFall
- "Hella Good" – No Doubt
- "Help Me" – Nick Carter
- "Here I Am" – Bryan Adams
- "Here Is Gone" – Goo Goo Dolls
- "Here to Stay" – Korn
- "Hero" – Chad Kroeger and Josey Scott
- "Hero" – Enrique Iglesias
- "Hey Baby" – No Doubt
- "Hikari" – Hikaru Utada
- "The Hindu Times" – Oasis
- "Hot in Herre" – Nelly
- "Hundred Million" – Treble Charger
- "I Care 4 U" – Aaliyah
- "I Feel So" – Box Car Racer
- "I Need a Girl (Part Two)" – P. Diddy, Ginuwine, Loon and Mario Winans
- "I Stand Alone" – Godsmack
- "I Think I Love You" – Kaci Battaglia
- "I'd Do Anything" – Simple Plan
- "If I Could Go" – Angie Martinez featuring Sacario & Lil Mo
- "I'm Alive" – Céline Dion
- "I'm Gonna Getcha Good!" – Shania Twain
- "I'm Just a Kid" – Simple Plan
- "I'm Not A Girl, Not Yet A Woman" – Britney Spears
- "In My Place" – Coldplay
- "In Your Eyes" – Kylie Minogue
- "independent" – Ayumi Hamasaki
- "It's Goin' Down" – The X-Ecutioners featuring Mike Shinoda and Mr. Hahn
- "Jenny from the Block" – Jennifer Lopez featuring Jadakiss and Styles P
- "Just like a Pill" – Pink
- "Keep Fishin'" – Weezer
- "The Ketchup Song (Asereje)" – Las Ketchup
- "Les Mots" – Mylène Farmer and Seal
- "Letters to You" – Finch
- "Lifestyles of the Rich and Famous" – Good Charlotte
- "Like I Love You" – Justin Timberlake
- "Little By Little" – Oasis
- "A Little Less Conversation" – Elvis Presley vs. JXL
- "Loneliness" - Tomcraft
- "Lose Yourself" – Eminem
- "Love at First Sight" – Kylie Minogue
- "Love Don't Let Me Go" – David Guetta
- "Marie" – Johnny Hallyday
- "A Moment Like This" – Kelly Clarkson
- "Motivation" – Sum 41
- "Move Bitch" – Ludacris featuring Mystikal and I-20
- "Move It Like This" - Baha Men
- "Murder on the Dancefloor" – Sophie Ellis Bextor
- "My Friends Over You" – New Found Glory
- "My Sacrifice" – Creed
- "My Neck, My Back" – Khia
- "Never Again" – Nickelback
- "A New Day Has Come" – Celine Dion
- "No More Drama" – Mary J. Blige
- "No One Knows" – Queens of the Stone Age
- "Not Gonna Get Us" – t.A.T.u.
- "One Last Breath" – Creed
- "Overprotected" – Britney Spears
- "Papa Don't Preach" – Kelly Osbourne
- "Prayer" – Disturbed
- "Precious Illusions" – Alanis Morissette
- "Put the Needle on It" – Dannii Minogue
- "Rapture" – iiO
- "The Red" – Chevelle
- "The Rising" – Bruce Springsteen
- "Rock the Boat" – Aaliyah
- "Running Away" – Hoobastank
- "Satellite" – P.O.D.
- "Satisfaction" – Benny Benassi
- "The Scientist" – Coldplay
- "Seein' Red" – Unwritten Law
- "She Hates Me" – Puddle of Mudd
- "She Loves Me Not" – Papa Roach
- "Sk8er Boi" – Avril Lavigne
- "Slow Burn" – David Bowie
- "Soak Up the Sun" – Sheryl Crow
- "Something to Talk About" – Badly Drawn Boy
- "Sound of the Underground" – Girls Aloud
- "Southern Sun/Ready Steady Go" – Paul Oakenfold
- "Spin" – Lifehouse
- "Stach Stach" – Bratisla Boys
- "Stay Together for the Kids" – Blink-182
- "Steve McQueen" – Sheryl Crow
- "Still Waiting" – Sum 41
- "Stop Crying Your Heart Out" – Oasis
- "Swing Swing" – All American Rejects
- "Take It Off" – The Donnas
- "Take Me Away" – 4 Strings
- "The Taste of Ink" – The Used
- "There Is" – Box Car Racer
- "A Thousand Miles" – Vanessa Carlton
- "Through the Rain" – Mariah Carey
- "The Tide Is High" – Atomic Kitten
- "Tomorrow" – SR-71
- "Too Bad" - Nickelback
- "Toxicity" – System of a Down
- "Tous ensemble" – Johnny Hallyday
- "Trackin'" – Billy Crawford
- "Tu trouveras" – Natasha St-Pier
- "Un Enfant de toi" – Phil Barney and Marlène Duval
- "Unbreakable" – Westlife
- "Underneath Your Clothes" – Shakira
- "Voyage" – Ayumi Hamasaki
- "We Are All Made of Stars" – Moby
- "What About Us?" – Brandy
- "What I Go To School For" – Busted
- "What It Is to Burn" – Finch
- "Where Do We Go from Here" – Filter
- "Where's Your Head At?" – Basement Jaxx
- "Whenever, Wherever" – Shakira
- "Wherever You Will Go" – The Calling
- "Without Me" – Eminem
- "Without You" – Silverchair
- "Work It" – Missy Elliott
- "World of Our Own" – Westlife (UK)
- "You Know You're Right" – Nirvana
- "Your Body Is A Wonderland" – John Mayer
- "The Zephyr Song" – Red Hot Chili Peppers

== Opera ==
- Friedrich Cerha – Der Riese vom Steinfeld
- Steve Reich – Three Tales
- Salvatore Sciarrino – Macbeth
- Michel van der Aa – One
- Rodney Waschka II – Saint Ambrose (recording only)

== Musical theater ==
- Bombay Dreams – London production
- Chitty Chitty Bang Bang – London production
- Hairspray – Broadway production opened at the Neil Simon Theatre on August 15 and ran for over 2500 performances
- Movin' Out – Broadway production opened at the Richard Rodgers Theatre and ran for 1303 performances
- Sweet Smell of Success: The Musical – Broadway production opened on March 14 at the Martin Beck Theatre and ran for 109 performances
- Taboo – London production opened January 29
- Thoroughly Modern Millie (musical) – Broadway production opened at the Marquis Theatre and ran for 903 performances
- We Will Rock You – London production

== Musical films ==
- 8 Mile a drama starring Eminem
- 8 Women
- 24 Hour Party People
- Aap Mujhe Achche Lagne Lage
- April Maadhathil, starring Srikanth and Sneha
- Bala, starring Shaam and Meera Jasmine
- Biggie & Tupac
- Chicago, starring Renée Zellweger, Catherine Zeta-Jones and Richard Gere
- Filles perdues, cheveux gras
- Green Lights
- I Am Trying to Break Your Heart: A Film About Wilco
- Return to Never Land (animated feature)
- Standing in the Shadows of Motown
- Unconditional Love

== Births ==
- January 2 – Jorja Douglas, English born Germany singer, member of Flo
- January 11 – Dro Kenji, American rapper
- January 16 – Eddie Benjamin, Australian singer-songwriter and music producer based in Los Angeles, California
- January 25 – Lil Mosey, American rapper and Internet personality
- January 30 – Tyla, South African singer, songwriter and dancer
- February 5 – Taehyun, Korean singer and dancer, member of TXT
- February 21
  - Duwap Kaine, American rapper
  - Marcus & Martinus, Norwegian brothers duo
- February 23 – Emilia Jones, English actress, singer, and songwriter
- February 26 – Nikita Kering, Kenyan musician, actress and media personality
- February 28 – Ylona Garcia, Filipino-Australian singer, songwriter and actress
- March 2 – Wonbin, Korean singer, member of Riize
- March 17 – Budjerah, Australian singer, from a Coodjinburra man from the Bundjalung nation.
- April 5 – Golden Cañedo, Filipina singer and entertainer, winner of The Clash season 1
- April 9 – Loren Gray, American singer
- April 18 – Noah Thompson, American singer
- April 24 – Skylar Stecker, American singer-songwriter and actress
- May 13 – Zoe Wees, German singer
- May 14 – Mariam Shengelia, Georgian singer
- May 15
  - Lil Huddy, American social media personality, singer, and actor
  - Hala Al Turk, Jordanian-Syrian Bahraini singer
- June 4 – Day, Hong Kong singer, member of COLLAR
- June 8 - Julia Boschman, Belgian singer, members of (K3)
- June 11 – Marf Yau, Hong Kong singer and actress, member of COLLAR
- June 14 – Ayra Starr, Beninese-born Nigerian singer
- June 25 – Benson Boone, American singer-songwriter and multi-instrumentalist
- June 26 – Manon Bannerman, Swiss singer, model, member of Katseye
- June 29 – Marlhy Murphy, American musician, actress, television personality, and internet personality
- July 4 – Yailin La Más Viral, Dominican rapper and singer
- July 7 – Caity Baser, British singer
- July 13 – Mad Tsai, American singer-songwriter
- July 14 – Kian, Australian singer-songwriter and musician
- July 23 – Lil' P-Nut, American rapper and actor
- July 25 – Shunsuke Michieda, Japanese singer and actor, member of Naniwa Danshi
- July 31
  - Abi Carter, American singer
  - João Gomes, Brazilian singer and songwriter
- August 6
  - Nessa Barrett, American singer and songwriter
  - Bailey May, Filipino-British singer, model, actor, dancer, and television personality
- August 13 - Stella Lefty, American singer-songwriter
- August 14 – Hueningkai, American-Korean singer, member of TXT
- August 15 – Kento Nagao, Japanese singer, member of Naniwa Danshi
- August 18 – Klavdia, Greek singer
- August 23 – Indiana Massara, Australian actress and singer
- August 25 – chandol, Korean-American alt-pop singer, musician
- August 26 – Lil Tecca, American rapper
- August 30 – Bktherula, American rapper
- September 3 – Kyline Alcantara, Filipina singer and TV personality
- September 5
  - Alika Milova, Estonian singer
  - Alessandra Mele, Italian-Norwegian singer
- September 7 – Ericdoa, American singer, songwriter, and record producer
- September 17 – ArrDee, English rapper
- September 20 – Gabriel LaBelle, Canadian singer
- September 23 – Maddie Ziegler, American dancer and actress
- September 24 – Gaeul, South Korean singer (IVE)
- September 25 – Renée Downer, English singer, member of Flo
- September 29 – Chloe Moriondo, American singer-songwriter and YouTuber
- October 2 – Jacob Sartorius, American singer
- October 6 – Cleopatra Stratan, Moldovan singer
- October 9
  - Any Gabrielly, Brazilian singer and dancer
  - Elka Cheng, Hong Kong singer, member of Lolly Talk
- October 15 – Malu Trevejo, Cuban singer and media personality
- October 23 – Ningning, Chinese singer, member of aespa
- October 24
  - Ado, Japanese singer
  - Lyn Lapid, American singer and instrumentist
- October 29 – Ruel, English born Australian soul R&B singer-songwriter
- November 1 – NLE Choppa, American rappert
- November 5
  - Jawsh 685, New Zealand beat maker and music producer
  - Stephen Sanchez, American singer and songwriter
- November 8 – Sunghoon, South Korean singer and former figure skater, member of Enhypen
- November 26 – Baylee Littrell, American country singer (son of Leighanne Wallace and Brian Littrell (Member of Backstreet Boys))
- December 4 – María Dueñas, Spanish violinist and composer
- December 13 – AC Bonifacio, Canadian dancer, singer, vlogger and actress
- December 16
  - Zera, Serbian-Austrian rapper and songwriter
  - Double Lz, British rapper and songwriter
- December 30 – Lina Kuduzović, Slovenian singer
- December 31 – Sophia Laforteza, Filipino-American singer, leader member of Katseye

== Deaths ==
- January 2 – Zac Foley (33), bassist of EMF (drug overdose)
- January 3 – Juan García Esquivel (83) Mexican band leader, pianist and composer
- January 7 – Jon Lee (33), Feeder drummer (suicide)
- January 20 – Ivan Karabyts (57), Ukrainian conductor and composer
- January 21 – Peggy Lee (81), jazz singer and songwriter
- January 22
  - Peter Bardens, (56), keyboardist of Camel
  - Sheldon Allman, (77)
- February 1 – Hildegard Knef (76), actress, singer, writer
- February 10 – Dave Van Ronk (65)
- February 13 – Waylon Jennings (64), country musician
- February 14 – Günter Wand (90), conductor
- February 24 – Leo Ornstein (106), composer
- March 1 – Doreen Waddell (36), singer who had worked with Soul II Soul and The KLF
- March 13 – Marc Moreland (44), guitarist (Wall of Voodoo, The Skulls) (liver failure)
- March 19 – John Patton (66), jazz and soul organist
- March 23 – Eileen Farrell (82), operatic soprano
- March 24 – Dorothy DeLay (84), Juilliard School violin teacher of Itzhak Perlman and Midori
- March 26 – Randy Castillo (51), drummer for Ozzy Osbourne & Mötley Crüe
- March 27 – Dudley Moore (66), English composer, pianist and actor
- March 31 – Lucio San Pedro (89), Filipino composer and teacher
- April 2 – Levi Celerio (91), Filipino composer and lyricist
- April 5 – Layne Staley (34), lead vocalist of Alice in Chains and Mad Season
- April 13 – Alex Baroni (35), singer
- April 15 – Ram Singh Thakur (87), Indian freedom fighter, musician and composer
- April 17 – Tak Shindo (79), musician, composer and arranger
- April 25 – Lisa Lopes (30), singer (car accident)
- April 27 – Hillous Butrum (74), country musician
- May 3 – Evgeny Svetlanov (73), composer and conductor
- May 6
  - Otis Blackwell (71), songwriter and pianist
  - Bjørn Johansen (61), Norwegian saxophonist
- May 7 – Xavier Montsalvatge (90), composer
- May 9 – Leon Stein (91), composer, conductor and musicologist (born September 18, 1910)
- June 5 – Dee Dee Ramone (50), of The Ramones (heroin overdose)
- June 6 – Robbin Crosby (42), guitarist (Ratt)
- June 13 – Ralph Shapey (81), American composer and conductor
- June 15 – Big Mello (33), rapper (car accident)
- June 27 – John Entwistle (57), bassist of The Who (heart attack)
- June 29 – Rosemary Clooney (74), US singer and actress
- July 2
  - Ray Brown (75), jazz bassist
  - Earle Brown (75), composer
- July 4 – Gerald Bales (83), Canadian organist and composer
- July 11 – Rosco Gordon (74), blues singer and songwriter
- July 19
  - Dave Carter (49), American singer-songwriter and guitarist
  - Alan Lomax (87), American folklorist, ethnomusicologist and musician
- July 21 – Gus Dudgeon (59), English music producer
- August 2
  - Joe Allison (77), songwriter
  - Magda László, operatic soprano
- August 9 – Bertold Hummel (76), German composer
- August 10 – Michael Houser (40), guitarist (Widespread Panic) (pancreatic cancer)
- August 14 – Dave Williams (30), vocalist of Drowning Pool
- August 31 – Lionel Hampton (94), vibraphone virtuoso
- September 7 – Erma Franklin (64), gospel singer
- September 20 – Joan Littlewood (87), impresario
- September 24 – Tim Rose, (62), singer-songwriter
- September 29 – Mickey Newbury (62), singer, songwriter
- October 3 – Darryl DeLoach (55), guitarist (Iron Butterfly)
- October 17 – Derek Bell (66), harpist (The Chieftains)
- October 18 – Roman Tam (57), singer
- October 24 – Adolph Green (87), lyricist
- October 25 – Richard Harris (72), actor and singer
- October 27 – Tom Dowd (77), recording engineer and producer
- October 30 – Jam-Master Jay (37), member of Run-D.M.C.
- November 3 – Lonnie Donegan (71), skiffle musician
- November 5 – Billy Guy (66), singer (The Coasters)
- November 21 – Hadda Brooks (86), U.S. jazz singer, pianist and composer
- November 28 – Dave "Snaker" Ray (59), blues singer and guitarist
- November 30 – Minuetta Kessler (88), concert pianist, classical composer and music educator
- December 9 – Mary Hansen (36), member of Stereolab (road accident)
- December 13 – Zal Yanovsky (57), rock singer and guitarist (The Lovin' Spoonful)
- December 22 – Joe Strummer (50), singer and guitarist of The Clash
- December 31 – Kevin MacMichael (51), Canadian guitarist of British band Cutting Crew

== Awards ==
- The following artists are inducted into the Rock and Roll Hall of Fame: Isaac Hayes, Brenda Lee, Tom Petty and the Heartbreakers, Gene Pitney, Ramones and Talking Heads
- Inductees of the GMA Gospel Music Hall of Fame include Pat Boone, and Amy Grant

=== ARIA Music Awards ===
- ARIA Music Awards of 2002

=== Grammy Awards ===
- Grammy Awards of 2002

=== Country Music Association Awards ===
- 2002 Country Music Association Awards

=== Eurovision Song Contest ===
- Eurovision Song Contest 2002

=== Mercury Music Prize ===
- A Little Deeper – Ms. Dynamite wins.

=== Glenn Gould Prize ===
- Pierre Boulez (laureate), Jean-Guihen Queyras (protégé)

== Charts ==
- Billboard Year-End Hot 100 singles of 2002

=== Triple J Hottest 100 ===
- Triple J Hottest 100, 2002

== See also ==
- 2002 in music (UK)
- Record labels established in 2002
