= Whole Numbers Play the Basics =

Studio album by Casino Versus Japan
- Released: September 17, 2002
- Recorded: 2001
- Length: 45:04
- Label: Carpark
- Producer: Erik Kowalski

Casino Versus Japan chronology
Go Hawaii (2000)	Whole Numbers Play the Basics (2002)	Hitori + Kaiso (1998–2001) (2004)

Whole Numbers Play the Basics is an album by Erik Kowalski under the alias of Casino Versus Japan. It was released in 2002 by Carpark Records. On its release, the album was praised by AllMusic, the BBC and Uncut while being panned by Pitchfork.

== Style ==
AllMusic and Pitchfork Media likened the sound of the album to Tomita, an electronic musician from the 1970s. and contemporary artists such as Boards of Canada. In relation to Boards of Canada, AllMusic stated that the album contains "a similar emphasis on stately breakbeats, a track listing that alternates short vignettes with longer pieces, and a series of light, airy melodies that frequently sound as though warped by long periods spent trapped in nearly forgotten synthesizers."

== Release ==
Whole Numbers Play the Basics was released by Carpark Records on September 17, 2002 in the United States. The album was released on compact disc, vinyl record, and as a digital download.

== Reception ==
Professional ratings
Review scores
Source	Rating
Allmusic	4.5/5 stars
Pitchfork	3.3/10
Uncut	4/5 stars

AllMusic awarded the album four and a half stars out of five, calling it a better album than his previous work titled Go Hawaii as it was "less precious" and that "nearly every one of the first eight songs is as delicious as anything produced by the indie-electronic pop movement of the past five years". The BBC praised the album, referring to it as "a welcome alternative to microscopic sonic manipulation and squeaky clean digital noises". The review concluded that "What stops it became mere flotation tank fodder is the sense of unease that sometimes lurks beneath its sublime drift" and "Utterly gorgeous". Uncut awarded the album a four out of five, opining that it "takes us back to the good old days when electronica wasn’t afraid to be beautiful" and "Probably the most wistful music you’ll hear this year".

Pitchfork Media gave the album a negative review, with a score of 3.3 out of 10, finding the outerspace themes too large of a cliche for electronic music and that the album's song sounded far too similar and derivative of other artists such as Tomita and Aphex Twin.

== Track listing ==
Track listing from AllMusic.

1. "Single Variation Of Two" – 3:45
2. "Moonlupe" – 1:26
3. "Aquarium" – 4:59
4. "The Possible Light" – 1:12
5. "Summer Clip" – 5:45
6. "Koma Sign-Off" – 0:20
7. "Em Essey" – 4:12
8. "Tryptiline Fabricate" – 1:12
9. "Where To? / What For?" – 5:38
10. "You Were There" – 1:34
11. "Making Lake Park In The Sun" – 3:51
12. "Manic Thru Tone" – 4:31
13. "Trad Velecido" – 1:10
14. "Slo Bid Bellwave" – 5:35

== See also ==
- 2002 in music
