= The Dawning of the Day =

Two old Irish airs

"The Dawning of the Day" (Irish: Fáinne Geal an Lae, literally "The bright ring of the day") is the name of two old Irish airs.

- "Fáinne Geal an Lae" (sometimes called "The Golden Star"), an air composed by the harpist Thomas Connellan in the 17th century.
- An Irish-language song with this name ("Fáinne Geal an Lae") was published by Edward Walsh (1805-1850) in 1847 in Irish Popular Songs and later translated into English as "The Dawning of the Day". It has become well known as the melody to which Patrick Kavanagh's "On Raglan Road" is sung. It is often played as a march and is one of the first tunes that a student of Irish music will learn.

O'Connellan's "Fáinne Geal an Lae" is often confused with the later pentatonic melody to which the words "The Dawning of the Day" is set. The O'Connellan air is different in a number of respects, although there are melodic resemblances. Words are still sung to variants of it which mostly use only the first half of the air as printed in Bunting and other collections.

The Irish-language lyrics of "Fáinne Geal an Lae" describe an aisling where the poet encounters a mysterious beautiful woman. In this case, she upbraids him as a frivolous rake and points to the approaching dawn.

== Lyrics ==
Notes: Helen of Troy is used in the translation rather than the literal Venus simply for its rhythm.

The final verse is a poetical rather than literal translation, which would be:

She said to me "go away
and let me go - you rake!
there from the south the light is coming
with the dawning of the day"

== Irish ==
Maidin moch do ghabhas amach,
Ar bruachaibh Locha Léin;
An Samhradh 'g teacht a's an chraobh len' ais,
Is lonrach te ón ngréin,
Ar thaisteal dom trí bhailte poirt
Is bánta míne réidhe,
Cé do gheobhainn lem ais ach an chúileann deas,
Le fáinne geal an lae.

Ní raibh bróg ná stoca, caidhp ná clóc;
Ar mo stóirin óg ón spéir,
Ach an folt fionn órga síos go troigh,
Ag fás go barr an fhéir.
Bhí calán crúite aici ina glaic,
A's ar dhrúcht ba dheas a scéimh,
Do rug barra gean ar Bhéineas dheas,
Le fáinne geal an lae.

Do shuigh an bhrideog síos lem ais,
Ar bhinse glas den fhéar,
Ag magadh léi bhíos dá maíomh go pras,
Mar mhnaoi ná scarfainn léi.
'S é dúirt sí liomsa, "imigh uaim,
Is scaoil ar siúl mé, a réic",
Sin iad aneas na soilse ag teacht,
Le fáinne geal an lae.

== English ==
One morning early I went out
On the shore of Lough Leinn
The leafy trees of summertime,
And the warm rays of the sun,
As I wandered through the townlands,
And the luscious grassy plains,
Who should I meet but a beautiful maid,
At the dawning of the day.

No cap or cloak this maiden wore
Her neck and feet were bare
Down to the grass in ringlets fell
Her glossy golden hair
A milking pail was in her hand
She was lovely, young and gay
Her beauty excelled even Helen of Troy
At the dawning of the day.

On a mossy bank I sat me down
With the maiden by my side
With gentle words I courted her
And asked her to be my bride
She turned and said, "Please go away,"
Then went on down the way
And the morning light was shining bright
At the dawning of the day.

translation by Na Casaidigh
