= Mad Tsai =

American musician and Influencer

- Born: Jonathan Tsai; July 13, 2001 (age 25); Orange County, California, United States
- Education: University of California, Los Angeles
- Occupation: Singer-songwriter
- Years active: 2020–present
- Musical career
- Origin: California, United States
- Genres: Pop; synth-pop
- Instrument: Vocals

YouTube information
- Channel: MadTsaiOfficial
- Years active: 2016–present
- Subscribers: 847 thousand
- Views: 197 million
- Last updated: 9 Apr. 2026
- Website: www.madtsai.com

Mad Tsai (born Jonathan Tsai) is an American singer-songwriter and social media personality. Of Taiwanese and Peruvian descent, Tsai gained recognition through the short-video platform TikTok under the handle @madsteaparty. His music explores themes of queerness, adolescence, and self-identity, often blending elements of pop, bedroom pop, and alternative music.

== Early life and education ==
Tsai was born in Fountain Valley, California, to a Taiwanese father and Peruvian mother. He began writing songs at the age of thirteen, inspired by themes of identity, mental health, and self-expression. While in high school, Tsai participated in choir and marching band, and learned to play several instruments.

He later attended the University of California, Los Angeles (UCLA), where he studied Music History & Industry and English.

== Career ==
=== Beginnings and TikTok popularity ===
Tsai began posting original music on TikTok in 2020 under the username @madsteaparty. His early work included acoustic clips and songs such as "Young Nights," which explored post-graduation uncertainty and emotional growth.

=== Breakthrough and "Boy Bi" ===
Tsai rose to prominence with the single "Boy Bi" (2020), a song chronicling his experiences coming out as bisexual. The song went viral on TikTok before being re-released as a studio single with full production. Tsai has described the track as an important moment of self-acceptance and a way to connect with others exploring their identity.

=== Continued releases and style ===
Following the success of "Boy Bi," Tsai released several singles, including "Stacy’s Brother" (2022), a queer reinterpretation of Fountains of Wayne’s "Stacy’s Mom". Within the single, he goes from crushing to dating while struggling to tell his friend. His music is characterized by its pop sensibility, introspective lyricism, and incorporation of queer and Asian-Latinx perspectives in coming-of-age storytelling.

He is known for utilizing thirst traps in advertisements for his songs. His first album was funded through Indify, a funding platform for indie artists.

In 2026, he appeared at the 2nd Grammy House pop-up in New York City by The Recording Academy.

== Discography ==
Selected singles

- "Boy Bi (Acoustic)" (2020)
- "Boy Bi" (2020)
- "killer queen" (2021)
- "stacy's brother" (2022)
- "in my head" (2022)
- "mad's world" (2023)
- "all american bitch!" (2024)
- "One Of The Boys" (2025)
- "DA DA DA" (2025)
- "BITE" (2025)
- "HOUNDSOFHELL" (2025)
- “STRAYS” (2026)
- "DIET" (2026)
- "no one's son" (2026)

EPs

- "homecoming!" (2022)
- "Mad Tsai - Spotify Singles" (2023)
- "teenage nightmare" (2024)
- "CANINES" (2026)

== Personal life ==
Tsai is openly bisexual and has described his music as both therapeutic and representative of queer Asian and Latinx youth. He publicly came out to his mother through the viral TikTok post accompanying "Boy Bi" in 2020.

== Reception ==
Critics have praised Tsai for his contribution to queer representation in pop music. Outlets such as Teen Vogue and Gold House have highlighted his work as an example of new queer and Asian-Latinx artistry emerging from social media.
