= Casino Versus Japan =

American electronic musician

- Born: Erik Paul Kowalski; May 5, 1973 (age 53); Manitowoc, Wisconsin, U.S.
- Origin: Milwaukee, Wisconsin, U.S.
- Genres: IDM; ambient techno; indie electronic; downtempo
- Years active: 1998–present
- Labels: Star Star Stereo; City Centre Offices; Carpark Records; Attacknine; Moodgadget; Wobblyhead
- Website: casinoversusjapan.bandcamp.com

Erik Paul Kowalski (May 5, 1973), most known as Casino Versus Japan is an American musician who works in electronic music.

== Influences ==
As a child, Erik Kowalski was originally heavily influenced by Jan Hammer's music for Miami Vice, as well as Vangelis and Jean-Michel Jarre. Kowalski taught himself piano, guitar and drums in the early '90s while in high school.

== Early work and releases ==
Recording guitar-based, ambient and experimental music as Radiogate between 1996 and 1997, Kowalski matured in the underground electronic music community in Milwaukee, Wisconsin. He worked at Atomic Records for 14 years and also wrote for the alternative fanzine Milk Magazine which also informed developments within many styles of innovative music. During this time he interviewed many of his favorite artists and influences. In early 1998, he approached Mike Bailey (d. 2019) of the local electronic label Star Star Stereo with some demo tapes, and shortly thereafter, released his self-titled debut Casino Versus Japan. This subsequently led to live performances (including several dates opening for Low) with Charles Wyatt (Charles Atlas) accompanying Kowalski on guitar, as well as a subsequent tour opening for Deerhunter in 2010. In January 2000, Go Hawaii was released on CD by Wobblyhead (later on double-vinyl LP by City Centre Offices, 2001). By the summer of 2002, the track "It's Very Sunny" was used in a Hummer television commercial. His third album Whole Numbers Play the Basics, followed in September 2002 on Carpark Records. The song "Manic Thru Tone" was used in MTV's "Choose Or Lose" campaign in the Fall of 2002. In 2012, the title track from Go Hawaii was covered by Adam Peters for use as the incidental theme music for Oliver Stone's film Savages.

== Collections and collaborations ==
Hitori + Kaiso 1998–2001, a collection of unreleased tracks, appeared in 2004. The album was compiled and released by Attacknine Records from a large archive of material initially presented as a gift to Nick Huntington of Freescha, and not intended for public release. Huntington enthusiastically encouraged a release, however, which also resulted in the 2010 collection Night on Tape, another batch of selected tracks from the same archive. Casino Versus Japan and Freescha released a Split EP together in 2004.

Tracks by Casino Versus Japan have featured heavily during the intermissions of NPR's Radiolab podcast. In July 2011 Radiolab were licensed to allow followers to download Casino Versus Japan's Miano: A Pink Night For Snowmen from the Night on Tape album.

== Discography ==
=== Albums and collections ===
- Casino Versus Japan, CD (1998, Star Star Stereo)
- Go Hawaii, CD (2000, Wobblyhead) 2x12" LP (2001, City Centre Offices)
- Whole Numbers Play the Basics, CD and LP (2002, Carpark Records)
- Hitori + Kaiso (1998–2001), Double CD (2004, Attacknine)
- Night on Tape (2010, Attacknine)
- Frozen Geometry (2016, self-release)
- Suicide By Sun (2018, self-release)
- Echo Counting (2021, self-release)
- Tagebuch einer Verlorenen (2024, self-release)

=== Singles and EPs ===
- Casino Versus Japan + Jessica Bailiff, split 7-inch (2000, Star Star Stereo)
- "Via", 10-inch (2001, Wobblyhead)
- "Casino Versus Japan + Freescha" [Split] CDEP/12" (2003, Wobblyhead)
- "Silver And Gold" b/w "64 Colors" Split 7-inch w/ Am Boy (2004, Wobblyhead)
- "Damaged Errata", "Scenic Loop" (2015, Attacknine)
