= Dancing Down the Stony Road =

Studio album by Chris Rea
- Released: 20 September 2002 (Jazzee Blue); 10 December 2002 (Edel)
- Recorded: February – June 2002
- Genres: Blues, gospel blues, blues rock
- Length: 86:14; 57:38
- Label: Jazzee Blue/Edel
- Producer: Chris Rea

Chris Rea chronology
The Very Best of Chris Rea (2001)	Dancing Down the Stony Road (2002)	Hofner Blue Notes (2003)

Stony Road cover art

Dancing Down the Stony Road is the seventeenth studio album by British singer-songwriter Chris Rea, released in September 2002 on his own record label, Jazzee Blue. The album was also released in Europe by Edel under the shorter title Stony Road with different cover art and only one CD (except Germany), while the original UK is double CD edition with additional tracks.< The album is notable for its change of Rea's previous rock music style to Delta blues and gospel blues. It reached the No. 14 in the UK Albums Chart, and was certified Gold by BPI. A version of Dancing Down The Stony Road was used in the BBC television programme Speed.

== Summary ==
In 2000 Rea was diagnosed with pancreatic cancer and in 2001 underwent a risky but life-saving surgical operation (known as a Whipple procedure), which left him ill and weakened. During his months-long stay in hospital he experienced an epiphany after someone brought him a copy of Miles Davis's Kind of Blue, which he listened to regularly. It inspired him to get a book on modulation, and later in life he still played it while painting, which he started during recuperation. His recuperation was hard because he was accustomed to writing a song every day, which he could no longer do. He later recalled that when he found an old Sister Rosetta Tharpe album in his home he burst into tears. Rea said that he was not afraid of dying although "it did look like the end, but what got me through was the thought of leaving a record that my two teenage daughters could say, 'That's what Papa did - not the pop stuff, but the blues music. That's what he was about.' And it is. Stony Road is the one you can pin on my headstone."

In another interview, Rea said that "it's not until you become seriously ill and you nearly die and you're at home for six months, that you suddenly stop, to realise that this isn't the way I intended it to be in the beginning. Everything that you've done falls away and start wondering why you went through all that rock business stuff". Although the record company offered him millions to do a duets album with music stars, having promised himself that if he recovered he would be returning to his blues roots. When Rea's record company East West Records refused to release the album, he decided to set up his own independent Jazzee Blue record label, freeing himself from the record company expectations and pressure. He recalled that "If the heads of all the music companies had known about music and about Chris Rea fans, they wouldn't have worried about Stony Road. My regular fans have always known that side of me... I knew they wouldn't have a problem with it. So I made Stony Road anyway. All the record companies rejected it. I was very pleased when it eventually went gold".

Most of the album is inspired by Delta blues, and Rea explains that "it's less aggressive than Chicago blues, and the guitar playing has a style I call curling: there are some notes that are not a sharp or a flat, but a bend of emotion. It's a mournful sound, and Delta people sing about deep pain, deep fear, and trying to save one's soul. Chicago players sing about girls and booze. Delta bluesmen were singing to the sky; Chicago bluesmen developed their stage act by singing to people who were drinking. It's a big difference". Particularly inspired by his original influence to take slide guitar, Charley Patton, others were Son House, Lead Belly, Blind Lemon Jefferson, Blind Willie Johnson and Robert Johnson.

== Release ==
The album was released in 2002 by Rea's independent record label, Jazzee Blue. It was released in a regular double CD edition, and deluxe edition (issued in three-fold Digipak), both with CD 1 enhanced with selected scenes from the accompanying DVD documentary, as well with 24 page lyric booklet. The album has also been released in Europe by Edel under the shorter title Stony Road with different cover art and only one CD, except in Germany where also was released in a limited edition with double CD and enhanced CD 1 with videos "Making Of Stony Road (Shortcut)" and "Dancing Down The Stony Road (Live From The Montreux Jazz Festival)".

Edel Records released a double DVD Stony Road, including on DVD 1 a 75 minute documentary of the making of the album as well 20 minute concert footage from Cologne and interviews, plus his gallery of paintings, while on DVD 2 a 23 minute concert footage from Chris Rea performance from the Montreux Jazz Festival in 2002.

== Reception ==
The original album in The Sunday Times review was described as "raw, honest music - a powerful blues album, and the best record Rea has ever made", in Q "that's a testament to the pull of the Delta Blues". In the Uncut review was given 3/5 stars, concluding "it's pleasing, JJ Cale kind of fare, but it should never have been a double CD. Even labours of love need editing". Helmut Moritz in a review of Stony Road one CD edition for laut.de gave 4/5 stars and that "ingenious songwriter finds incessantly the concise chords that provide the stage for his gloomy life experiences [...] has created a unique collection". Jörn Schlüter for German edition of Rolling Stone gave it 3/5 stars.

== Track listing ==
All songs written and composed by Chris Rea.

Dancing Down the Stony Road (2-CD Jazzee Blue edition)

CD1:

1. "Easy Rider" – 4:50
2. "Stony Road" – 5:32
3. "Dancing the Blues Away" – 4:39
4. "Catfish Girl" – 3:13
5. "Burning Feet" – 5:01
6. "Slow Dance" – 4:11
7. "Segway" – 2:23
8. "Mississippi 2" – 4:41
9. "So Lonely" – 3:17
10. "Heading for the City" – 6:09

CD2:

1. "Ride On" – 4:18
2. "When the Good Lord Talked to Jesus" – 4:16
3. "Qualified" – 4:55
4. "Sun Is Rising" – 6:48
5. "Someday My Peace Will Come" – 3:49
6. "Got to Be Moving On" – 3:47
7. "Ain't Going Down This Way" – 3:14
8. "Changing Times" – 3:05
9. "The Hustler" – 4:12
10. "Give That Girl a Diamond" – 3:54

Stony Road (1-CD Edel Edition)

1. "Changing Times" – 3:05
2. "Easy Rider" – 4:50
3. "Stony Road" – 5:30
4. "Dancing the Blues Away" – 4:38
5. "Burning Feet" – 5:01
6. "Mississippi 2" – 4:41
7. "Slow Dance" – 4:11
8. "When the Good Lord Talked to Jesus" – 4:16
9. "Heading for the City" – 6:08
10. "So Lonely" – 3:19
11. "Someday My Peace Will Come" – 3:51
12. "The Hustler" – 4:14
13. "Diamond" / "Give That Girl a Diamond" – 3:54

Stony Road (2-CD Edel Edition)

CD1:

1. "Changing Times" – 3:05
2. "Easy Rider" – 4:50
3. "Stony Road" – 5:32
4. "Dancing the Blues Away" - 4:39
5. "Burning Feet" – 5:01
6. "Mississippi 2" – 4:41
7. "Slow Dance" – 4:11
8. "When the Good Lord Talked to Jesus" – 4:16
9. "Heading for the City" – 6:09
10. "So Lonely" – 3:17
11. "Someday My Peace Will Come" – 3:49
12. "The Hustler" – 4:12
13. "Give That Girl a Diamond" – 3:54

CD2:

1. "Sun Is Rising" – 6:48
2. "Got to Be Moving On" – 3:47
3. "Ain't Going Down This Way" – 3:14
4. "Catfish Girl" – 3:13
5. "Ride On" – 4:18
6. "Segway" – 2:23
7. "Qualified" – 4:55

== Personnel ==
Album

- Chris Rea – vocals, acoustic piano, organ, guitars, producer, paintings
- Ed Hession – accordion
- Robert Ahwai – guitars
- Gerry O'Connor – banjo
- Sylvin Marc – bass
- Martin Ditcham – drums
- Stewart Eales – engineer
- Jon Kelly – mastering
- Peacock – design
- Olaf Heine – photography
- John Knowles – management

Video

- Chris Rea – producer
- Andy Wilman – producer
- John Knowles – executive producer
- Robert Payton – director
- Chris Rodmell – film editor
- Aiden Farrell – video editor
- Douglas Dreger – sound mix
- Richard Williams – narrator
- Peacock – design
- Olaf Heine – photography
- Janina Stamps – production manager

== Charts and certifications ==
=== Charts ===
Chart performance for Dancing Down the Stony Road
Chart (2002)	Peak position
Austrian Albums (Ö3 Austria)	18
Belgian Albums (Ultratop Flanders)	31
Dutch Albums (Album Top 100)	21
French Albums (SNEP)	115
German Albums (Offizielle Top 100)	11
Hungarian Albums (MAHASZ)	22
Swedish Albums (Sverigetopplistan)	29
Swiss Albums (Schweizer Hitparade)	28
UK Albums (Official Charts)	14
UK Independent Albums (Official Charts)	3
UK Jazz & Blues Albums (Official Charts)	2

=== Certifications ===
Certifications for Dancing Down the Stony Road
Region	Certification	Certified units/sales
United Kingdom (BPI)	Gold	100,000^{^}
^{^} Shipments figures based on certification alone.
