= Chloë (Chloë Agnew album) =

Studio album by Chloë Agnew
- Released: 16 December 2002; 29 January 2008
- Label: Celtic Collection; Valley Entertainment

Chloë Agnew chronology
Chloë (2002)	Chloë: Walking in the Air (2004)

Chloë is the debut album of Irish singer Chloë Agnew. It was released in 2002 by Celtic Collection records. In 2008, it was released in the United States via Valley Entertainment.

== Track listing ==
Standard
No.	Title	Length
1.	"Angel's Song"	3:57
2.	"Danny Boy"	3:50
3.	"Ave Maria"	2:52
4.	"When You Believe"	3:34
5.	"The Water Is Wide"	3:08
6.	"The Voice of Home"	4:28
7.	"Walking in the Air"	3:21
8.	"The Prayer"	4:20
9.	"The Last Rose of Summer"	3:19
10.	"Lascia Ch'io Pianga"	4:15
11.	"Brahm's Lullabye"	3:12
Total length:		40:16

== Personnel ==
Adapted from CD Universe's product description.

- Chloë Agnew - Voice
- David Agnew - Oboe
- Liz Foster - Background vocals
