= Chloë Agnew =

Irish singer

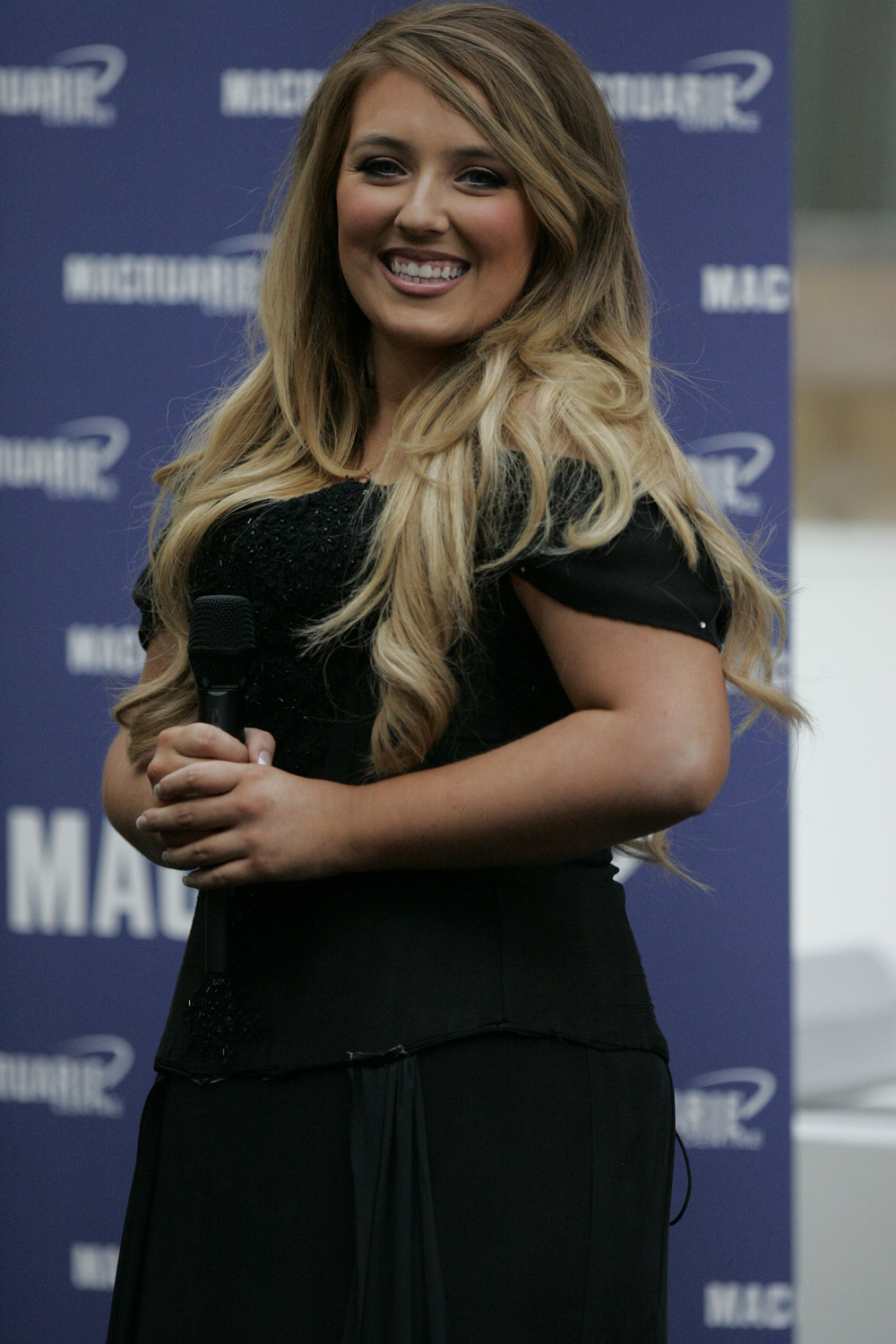
- Chloë Agnew at Macquarie Shopping Centre, Sydney, in August 2012
- Born: 9 June 1989 (age 37); Knocklyon, Ireland
- Occupation: Singer
- Years active: 1998–present
- Parents: David Agnew (father); Adele King (mother)
- Musical career
- Genres: Celtic; classical; pop
- Instrument: Vocals
- Labels: Celtic Collections; Manhattan
- Formerly of: Celtic Woman
- Website: www.chloeagnewofficial.com

Chloë Agnew (born 9 June 1989) is an Irish singer, best known for being an original and former member of the Celtic music group Celtic Woman.

== Early life and career ==
Agnew was born to Irish entertainer Adele "Twink" King and Irish oboist David Agnew in Knocklyon, County Dublin, where she lived with her mother and younger sister, Naomi.

She made her first television appearance on her mother's programme aged four weeks old, and later sang on the show at the age of six. She attended Notre Dame des Missions Junior School for her primary school education, followed by Alexandra College girls' school.

In 1998, Agnew represented Ireland and was the winner of the Grand Prix at the First International Children's Song Competition in Cairo with a song called The Friendship Tree. She then began to perform pantomime at the Olympia Theatre in Dublin and continued in that role for four years.

In 1999, she appeared in The Young Messiah, a modern adaptation of Handel's Messiah. In this production, she played one of the children and performed sign language.

== Musical career ==
Agnew has sung in English, Irish, Latin, Italian, and German and has a soprano vocal range.

In 2000, aged 11, Agnew approached director David Downes about recording a song to raise money for the children of Afghanistan. With his help, she recorded Angel of Mercy for the album This Holy Christmas Night, which raised over £20,000 for the Afghan Children's Charity Fund in 2001. That same year, she joined the Christ Church Cathedral Girls' Choir, and remained a member for three years.

In 2002, she was signed to Celtic Collections, and with the backing of Downes she recorded her debut album Chloë. In 2004, she released her second album, Chloë: Walking in the Air. She also recorded a companion DVD for her second album, released in Europe in 2004 and in North America in 2007.

She appeared as part of the group Celtic Woman at The Helix in Dublin in 2004, the youngest member at the time. Agnew has been featured on 14 albums with the group, recording songs in multiple languages and taking part in several world tours.

In 2009, Agnew was invited by Italian tenor Alessandro Rinella to sing with him on his debut album.

In 2012, Agnew was named Female Vocalist of the Year at the Irish Music Awards.

On 5 August 2013, Celtic Woman announced Agnew would be taking a break from Celtic Woman to focus on solo projects. Her position was filled by Derry-born singer Mairéad Carlin.

After leaving Celtic Woman, Agnew was chosen to be the special guest of the Celtic Thunder cruise. She, along with former Celtic Thunder member Paul Byrom, was also a special guest of Lisa Kelly's concerts called The Voice of Ireland and A Celtic Christmas. Agnew was also part of Ethan Bortnick's concert with another former Celtic Thunder member Damian McGinty.

Agnew did a concert performance with her boyfriend Dermot Kiernan and American singer-songwriters Kate Steinway and Marissa Lauren in the LA Songwriting school on 2015.

On 22 January 2020, it was announced that Agnew was returning to Celtic Woman for the US Celebration Tour to fill in for Éabha McMahon, who was taking a leave from the group. However the tour was postponed shortly after due to the COVID-19 pandemic. On 21 April 2020, Agnew announced that she would be rejoining the group for the rescheduled Celebration Tour. Agnew then announced that she would participate in the Postcards from Ireland Tour as well as the Postcards from Ireland album and TV special/DVD. On 19 August 2022, Agnew announced that she would be taking a break from group once again to focus on solo projects.

During an interview by Beliefnet, Agnew commented on Irish music:

Irish music was bred into us from the day we are born. Looking back to our ancestors and our heritage, it was always in our culture. Even through the hardest of times Irish people always turned to music. They have a song for everything – for drinking, for depression, for famine. I remember a song growing up that was for milking the cows.

Agnew is a member of the Roman Catholic Church. She often says prayers just before going on stage to "Calm her nerves".

== Discography ==
Solo

Title	Release	Record label
Chloë	2002	Celtic Collection
Walking In The Air	2004	Manhattan Records
Chloë	2008	Rerelease of 2002 album through Valley Entertainment
Love Is Christmas	2013	Sony / ATV Tunes LLC
The Thing About You (EP)	2018	Spachtula Music Group
Reimagined	2019	Chlover Records
Bittersweet	2025	Little Assembly Limited

With Celtic Woman

All albums are released through Manhattan Records

Album	Release	Notes
Celtic Woman	2005	
A Christmas Celebration	2006	
A New Journey	2007	
The Greatest Journey	2008	
Songs from the Heart	2010	
Lullaby	2011	
Believe	2011	
Home for Christmas	2012	
Silent Night	2012	
Emerald - Musical Gems	2014	
Solo	2015	Compilation
Christmas	2015	Compilation
Decade	2016	Compilation
The Best of Christmas	2017	Compilation
Celebration: 15 Years of Music & Magic	2020	Compilation
Postcards from Ireland	2021	
20th Anniversary	2024	
