= Ericson Alexander Molano =

Colombian singer (born 1979)

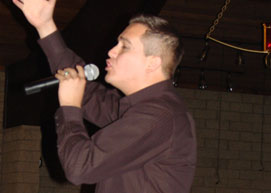

Background information
- Born: Ericson Alexander Molano; November 20, 1979 (age 46)
- Origin: Pereira, Colombia
- Genres: Gospel; Christian; Spanish
- Occupations: Singer; songwriter; record producer; musician; pastor
- Instruments: Vocals; guitar
- Years active: 1999–present
- Label: Jehova-Nisi Producciones

Ericson Alexander Molano (born November 20, 1979) is a Colombian Christian singer, known for his song "Dios Manda Lluvia". He has a Production company, Jehova-Nisi Producciones; where he is President and General Director. He is currently touring.

In 1999, he released his first album Él Vive Hoy, which sold more than 100,000 copies. This album includes the hit single Dios Manda Lluvia. In 2002, he released his second album, Fue Por Ti. In 2004 saw the release of Mi Pasion, featuring the singles "Mi Pasion", "Melodia Angelical", "Siento Su Gloria", "Rendir Mi Vida", and a duet with Karina Moreno, "Es Por Ti". His album, Vuelvo a Ti, released in 2006, was well received. Recorded live in 2005 in Mexico, it features the hit, "Soy Sano". In 2007 he released a DVD featuring his Greatest Hits entitled Lo Mejor de Ericson Alexander Molano. His fourth album, No Fue En Vano, was released in July 2008.

== Biography ==
=== Early years ===
Eric Alexander Molano was born on November 20, 1979, in Pereira, Colombia, the son of Reverends Nubia and Hugo Molano. He is the oldest of 4 siblings - Sandra, Libni "Leo", Gerson and Melissa Molano. He followed his parents on Missionary trips around the world, spreading Christianity through Music and Worship. His family moved to the United States in 1986. Eventually setting place in Long Beach, California, where they would form Ministerios Salem Internacional. Their Ministry is all around the world, which includes: the United States, Mexico, Guatemala, Venezuela, Colombia, and Peru. In 1999, Molano received his bachelor's degree in electronic engineering.

=== Music career (1999–present) ===
On November 27, 1999, Molano recorded his first live album, Él Vive Hoy, in his local church Ministerios Salem Internacional. The album contains the song "Dios Manda Lluvia". The song made Molano famous within the Christian community. The album also includes the songs such as "Siempre te Alabare", "El Vive Hoy", and "Hosanna al Rey".

In 2000, he founded his recording label, Jehova-Nisi Producciones. (Also referred to as JN Productions as in Spanish, JN Producciones). There are currently five other artists on this label: Erick Porta, David Beltran, Manuel Garcia Jr., Eddie Soto, and Ruth Esther. He's the President and General Director of JN Productions.

On March 22, 2002, he recorded his second live album, Fue Por Ti, in Van Nuys, California. The album's first single was "Maestro Tócame", which debuted in August 2002. The song was then proceeded by "Alegría" and "Estoy Enamorado". On August 3, 2002, the album was released.

Molano took a two-year break. On April 17, 2004, he recorded his third live album, Mi Pasión, in Santa Ana, California. The album had two released dates; the audience present at the recording received their copy of the album in July 2004. The album, however, was released to the public in August 2004. The album contained singles like, "Mi Pasion", "Melodia Angelical", "Siento Su Gloria" and "Rendir Mi Vida".

His fourth album Vuelvo A Ti was a live album recorded in Mexico on August 21, 2005. The album was released on January 27, 2006. The album contains "Soy Sano" and the title track, "Vuelvo a Ti".

His first DVD, Lo Mejor de Ericson A. Molano, was released in June 2007. On January 22, 2008, it was announced that Lo Mejor de Ericson A. Molano would be released as a two-disc album. It was released on February 8. On April 23, 2008, Molano recorded his fifth album, No Fue En Vano. The album was released on July 4, 2008.

== Discography ==
- Él Vive Hoy (1999)
- Fue Por Ti (2002)
- Mi Pasión (2004)
- Vuelvo A Ti (2006)
- Lo Mejor De Ericson Alexander Molano (2007)
- No Fue En Vano (2008)
- Nada Es Imposible (2011)
- Yo Creo (2013)
- En Su Presencia (2017)
- Ha Vencido (2019)

== Personal life ==
Molano married Nancy Garcia on July 10, 2005, at Crystal Cathedral in Garden Grove, California. Ericson and Nancy have two children Alexander and Audriana Molano and are Senior Pastors at MSI Orange County (2017–present)

Molano is left-handed. He is a Colombian soccer fan.
