= Grey Crow (album) =

Studio album by Eligh
- Released: November 9, 2010
- Genre: Hip hop
- Length: 64:43
- Label: Legendary Music
- Producer: Eligh, Elusive, Starkey

Eligh chronology
Gandalf's Beat Machine Level 3 (2009)	Grey Crow (2010)	80 Hrtz (2015)

Professional ratings
Review scores
Source	Rating
HipHopDX	3.5/5
Potholes in My Blog	4/5 stars
RapReviews.com	7/10

Grey Crow is a studio album by American hip hop musician Eligh. It was released by Legendary Music on November 9, 2010. It peaked at number 75 on the Billboard Top R&B/Hip-Hop Albums chart, as well as number 47 on the Heatseekers Albums chart.

== Track listing ==
No.	Title	Producer(s)	Length
1.	"Sad of Eye (Intro)"	Eligh	1:01
2.	"Angel of Death"	Eligh	3:41
3.	"Soul on the Road"	Eligh	3:43
4.	"Love ov My Life" (featuring Luckyiam and Paris Hayes)	Eligh	4:35
5.	"Find Yourself" (featuring Paris Hayes)	Eligh	4:52
6.	"When I'm a Dad"	Eligh	4:18
7.	"Wish I Would" (featuring Inspired Flight)	Eligh	3:26
8.	"Miss Busdriver (Rachel)"	Eligh	3:26
9.	"Shine" (featuring K.Flay and The Grouch)	Eligh	3:50
10.	"Stuck with You" (featuring Aesop Rock)	Eligh	3:40
11.	"Desire" (featuring Inspired Flight)	Eligh	4:58
12.	"Skitzo" (featuring Ellay Khule, Basik, and DJ Bonds)	Eligh	4:11
13.	"Whirlwind" (featuring Pigeon John)	Eligh	3:56
14.	"Wake Up!" (featuring Brother Ali and Lisa Ahlstrom)	Eligh	3:49
15.	"Beneath the Sea" (featuring Zumbi and Scarub)	Eligh	4:27
16.	"Maybe So"	Elusive	2:42
17.	"Suffocate" (featuring Marty James, Lisa Ahlstrom, and Paul Dateh)	Starkey	4:09

== Charts ==
Chart	Peak position
US Top R&B/Hip-Hop Albums (Billboard)	75
US Heatseekers Albums (Billboard)	47
