= Marty James =

American singer-songwriter

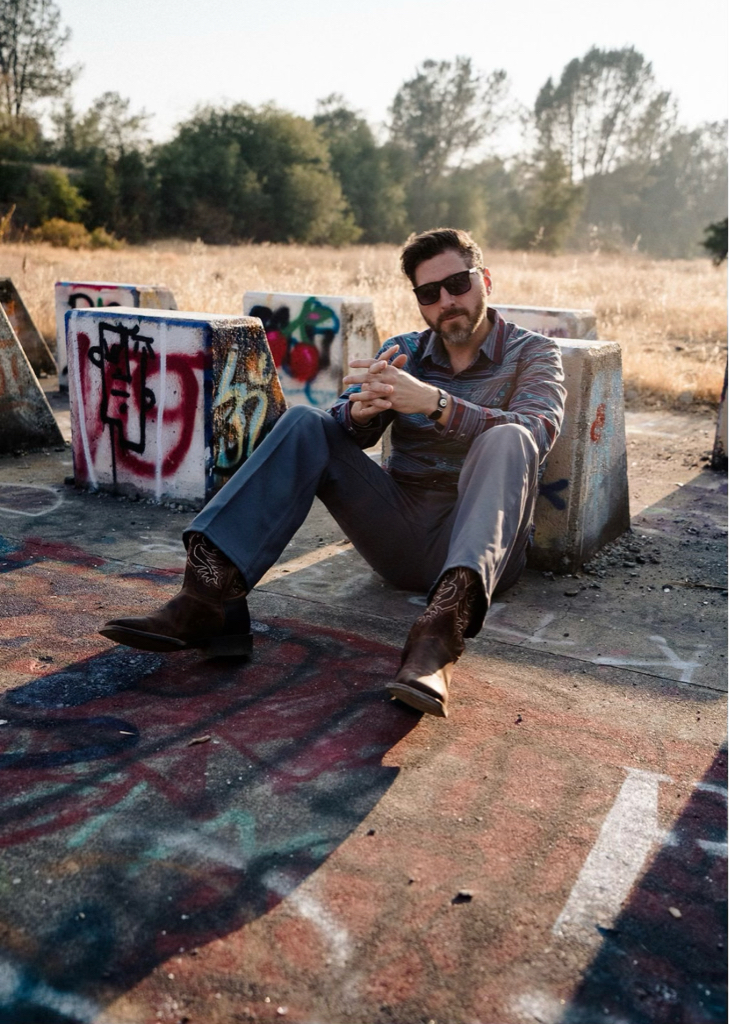
- Marty James in December 2023

Background information
- Origin: Chico, California, United States
- Genres: Latin; pop; hip hop; soul; country; alternative; rock
- Occupations: Songwriter, producer, performer
- Instruments: Vocals, keyboard, programming (music)
- Years active: 2000–present
- Labels: Low Post, Grand Royal, Avatar Records, Mercury, Island Def Jam, UnderByte Sound
- Website: Official website

Marty James Garton Jr. is an American singer-songwriter and record producer from Chico, California. He has released albums and singles as the front man and producer of Scapegoat Wax and One Block Radius and as part of the writer-producer management division of The Core Entertainment. James co-wrote the English-language remix of Luis Fonsi's Despacito Remix, which featured Daddy Yankee and Justin Bieber. The song went on to top charts in both English- and Spanish-speaking parts of the world, was nominated for three Grammys, and won numerous music awards including a Latin Grammy, Billboard Music Awards, American Music Awards, and Billboard Latin Music Awards. He also wrote the 2023 song "Religiously" for country musician Bailey Zimmerman which peaked at No.1 on the Canada Country Billboard Chart and US Country Airplay chart.

== Early life and education ==
James grew up in Dixon, CA but moved to Chico, CA with his father. By 13, James was performing at local talent shows and making his own demos on equipment he purchased himself. He began submitting the demos to labels and producers in the Bay Area and Los Angeles when he was 16.

== Career ==
=== Early career ===
During high school, James was discovered by Johnny Zunino of N2Deep. After his two previous groups disbanded, James and Zunino started Scapegoat Wax. The band originally signed to Good Vibe Recordings in 1999 for their first album, Luxurious. In 2000 they moved to the Beastie Boys' Grand Royal Label, and James worked with Mike D on the band's second album, Okeeblow. When Grand Royal closed, the band went to Hollywood Records and released SWAX in 2002. The band gained critical acclaim with the media, but failed to establish commercial success. The band was best known for their single "Aisle 10 (Hello Allison)", which reached moderate success in the US and was part of the Xbox video game Jet Set Radio Future as well as being on the soundtrack for Project Gotham Racing. They also released other singles which were used in motion picture soundtracks and television shows, such as Clockstoppers, America's Sweethearts and 40 Days and 40 Nights, the episode "Company Picnic: Part 2" of Malcolm in the Middle and the unaired pilot of Wonderfalls.

In 2004, James started One Block Radius with Mr. Dope America, who toured with Scapegoat Wax, and San Francisco emcee Z Man. They signed to Los Angeles independent label Avatar Records in 2005 and released the album Long Story Short, which James wrote, produced, and mixed. During that time, James was also featured as a guest vocalist on songs by Snoop Dogg, Baby Bash, Paul Wall, The Federation, E-40, and others.

=== 2010-present ===
Since 2010, James has focused on songwriting and producing music for others. He has written songs with and for Jason Derulo, Enrique Iglesias, Pitbull, Snoop Dogg, Christina Aguilera, Timbaland, Afrojack, Nelly, Akon, Wiz Khalifa, Sean Kingston, Ty Dolla $ign, Nicky Jam, Will Smith, and G-Eazy. In 2016, James co-wrote "Don't You Need Somebody" for RedOne. The same year, Luis Fonsi and Erika Ender brought James on to help with remixing their Spanish-language song "Despacito Remix," featuring Puerto Rican rapper Daddy Yankee. James, whose mother's family is of Mexican heritage, has written songs for Latin artists. The English language remix that James worked on was intended to expand the appeal of the original song which had already been a success. Justin Bieber was brought on to sing on the remix.

"Despacito" was released in April 2017 and received international attention, topping charts in 47 countries. It topped the Billboard Hot 100 for a record-tying 16 weeks and topped the Latin 100 for a record-breaking 52 weeks. The song was nominated for three Grammys in 2018: Best Song, Best Record, and Best Pop-Duo. The song won the Best Urban Fusion/Performance award at the 2018 Latin Grammys. The song was also nominated for and won awards at the American Music Awards, Billboard Music Awards, and Billboard Latin Music Awards.

James became part of the producer management division of The Core Entertainment in 2023. The same year he wrote the song "Religiously" for country musician Bailey Zimmerman. The song peaked at No.1 on the Canada Country Billboard Chart and US Country Airplay, as well as receiving an ARIA Gold certification.

== Discography ==
=== With Scapegoat Wax ===
- Luxurious (1999)
- Okeeblow (2001)
- SWAX (2002)
- Atomic Slam (2022)

=== With One Block Radius ===
- Long Story Short 2005
- One Block Radius 2008

=== Select guest appearances ===
| Year | Title | Artist(s) | Album |
|---|---|---|---|
| 2006 | "I Wear My Sunglasses at Night” | The Federation feat. E-40 | |
| 2007 | "Another Day” | Luckyiam | Most Likely to Succeed |
| 2007 | "Half a Dream” | Mr. J Medeiros | Of Gods and Girls |
| 2008 | "Next to You” | Mike Jones | The Voice |
| 2008 | "The Time” | The Grouch | Show You the World |
| 2009 | "Get That Money” | Far East Movement | Animal |
| 2009 | "I Grind” | Paul Wall | Fast Life |
| 2009 | "Denial” | The Grouch and Eligh | Say G&E |
| 2010 | "Fantasy Girl” | Baby Bash | Bashtown |
| 2010 | "Contact” | Drop City Yacht Club | |
| 2010 | "Rick Rock Horns” | E-40 | Revenue Retrivin’: Day Shift |
| 2010 | "New Year's Eve” | Snoop Dogg | |
| 2010 | "Suffocate” | Eligh | Grey Crow |
| 2011 | "Fried" feat. Tech N9ne | E-40 | Revenue Retrievin’: Graveyard Shift |
| 2011 | "El Lay” | Snoop Dogg | Doggumentary |
| 2011 | "Dancing on My Own” | Pixie Lott | Young Foolish Happy |
| 2011 | "Test of Time” | Zion I and The Grouch | Heroes in the Healing of a Nation |
| 2011 | "Elevator Love” | The Rej3ctz | |
| 2016 | "Crack the Combination” | Baby Bash | Don't Panic It's Organic |
| 2021 | "Hi Lo” | Paul Wall | Hall of Fame Hustler |
| 2021 | "Run It Up" | Seeb | Sad in Scandinavia |

=== Select writing/production credits ===
| Year | Group | Song | Album | Role |
|---|---|---|---|---|
| 2008 | Baby Bash | "What is it" feat. Sean Kingston | Cyclone | Writer |
| 2008 | Mike Jones | "Next to You” | | Writer |
| 2009 | MoZella | "Four Leaf Clover” | Belle Island | Producer |
| 2009 | MoZella | "Freezing” | Belle Island | Producer |
| 2009 | MoZella | "Let's Stop Calling it Love” | Belle Island | Producer |
| 2009 | MoZella | "Uh-Uh” | Belle Island | Producer / Vocals |
| 2011 | Iyaz | "Pretty Girls" feat. Travie McCoy | | Writer |
| 2012 | Cover Drive | "Lick Ya Down” | Bajan Style | Writer |
| 2012 | Chris Rene | "Young Homie” | I’m Right Here | Producer |
| 2013 | Fantasia | "In Deep” | Side Effects of You | Writer |
| 2013 | Sean Kingston | "Back 2 Life (Live it Up)" feat. T.I. | Back 2 Life | Writer |
| 2013 | Sean Kingston | "Bomba” | Back 2 Life | Writer |
| 2013 | Sean Kingston | "How We Survive" feat. Busta Rhymes | Back 2 Life | Writer |
| 2013 | Sean Kingston | "Ordinary Girl” | Back 2 Life | Writer |
| 2014 | Enrique Iglesias | "Heart Attack” | Sex and Love | Writer |
| 2014 | Enrique Iglesias | "I’m a Freak" feat. Pitbull | Sex and Love | Writer |
| 2014 | Enrique Iglesias | "Let Me Be your Lover" feat. Pitbull | Sex and Love | Writer |
| 2014 | Enrique Iglesias | "Only a Woman” | Sex and Love | Writer |
| 2014 | Enrique Iglesias | "Still your King” | Sex and Love | Writer |
| 2014 | Enrique Iglesias | "There Goes my Baby" feat. Flo Rida | Sex and Love | Writer |
| 2014 | Enrique Iglesias | "You and I” | Sex and Love | Writer |
| 2014 | Enrique Iglesias | "Turn the Night Up" | Sex and Love | Writer |
| 2014 | Jason Derulo | "With the Lights on” | Tattoos/Talk Dirty | Writer |
| 2015 | The Janoskians | "MoodSwings” | | Writer |
| 2015 | Sean Paul | "Bust It” | The Perfect Guy Motion Picture Soundtrack | Writer |
| 2015 | Nicky Jam and Enrique Iglesias | "Forgiveness" (El Perdon) | | Writer |
| 2015 | Akon | "Burning Alive” | | Writer |
| 2015 | Empire Season 2 | "Runnin” | | Writer |
| 2016 | Jay Sean feat. Sean Paul | "You Make My Love Go” | | Writer |
| 2016 | Red One feat. Enrique Iglesias, Shaggy, R. City, Seerayah | "Don't You Need Somebody" | | Writer |
| 2016 | Afrojack feat. Ty Dolla $ign | "Gone” | | Writer |
| 2016 | Dirty Heads | "So Long” | | Writer |
| 2016 | Marteen | "Draymond” | | Writer |
| 2017 | Nelly | "Sounds Good to Me” | | Writer |
| 2017 | Jack & Jack | "All Weekend Long” | | Writer |
| 2017 | Luis Fonsi & Daddy Yankee feat. Justin Bieber | "Despacito Remix" | | Writer |
| 2017 | Enrique Iglesias feat. Sean Paul | "Subeme la Radio (Remix)” | | Writer |
| 2018 | Enrique Iglesias feat. Pitbull | "Move to Miami” | | Writer |
| 2018 | Marteen | "Nothankyou” | NOTHANKYOU. | Writer |
| 2018 | Marteen | "Left to Right" | NOTHANKYOU. | Writer |
| 2018 | Marteen | "Sriracha" | NOTHANKYOU. | Writer |
| 2018 | Marteen | "Two Days" | NOTHANKYOU. | Writer |
| 2018 | Marteen | "We Cool" | NOTHANKYOU. | Writer |
| 2018 | Nicky Jam feat. Will Smith, Era Istrefi | "Live it Up" | | Writer |
| 2018 | Sublime with Rome | "Wicked Heart" | | Writer |
| 2019 | Reiji Kawaguchi | "Departure" | | Writer |
| 2023 | Bailey Zimmerman | "Religiously" | Religiously. The Album. | Writer |
| 2023 | Bailey Zimmerman | "Get to Gettin' Gone" | Religiously. The Album. | Writer |

== Awards and nominations ==
=== Grammy Awards ===
| Year | Nominee / work | Award | Result |
|---|---|---|---|
| 2018 | "Despacito Remix" (featuring Justin Bieber) | Song of the Year | Nominated |
| 2018 | "Despacito Remix" (featuring Justin Bieber) | Record of the Year | Nominated |
| 2018 | "Despacito Remix" (featuring Justin Bieber) | Best Pop Duo | Nominated |

=== Latin Grammy Awards ===
| Year | Nominee / work | Award | Result |
|---|---|---|---|
| 2017 | "Despacito" (featuring Justin Bieber) | Best Urban Fusion/Performance | Won |

=== American Music Awards ===
| Year | Nominee / work | Award | Result |
|---|---|---|---|
| 2017 | "Despacito Remix" (featuring Justin Bieber) | Collaboration of the Year | Won |
| 2017 | "Despacito Remix" (featuring Justin Bieber) | Favorite Pop/Rock Song | Won |

=== Billboard Music Awards ===
| Year | Nominee / work | Award | Result |
|---|---|---|---|
| 2018 | "Despacito" (featuring Justin Bieber) | Top 100 Song | Won |
| 2018 | "Despacito" (featuring Justin Bieber) | Top Selling Song | Won |
| 2018 | "Despacito" (featuring Justin Bieber) | Top Streaming Song (Audio) | Nominated |
| 2018 | "Despacito" (featuring Justin Bieber) | Top Streaming Song (Video) | Won |
| 2018 | "Despacito" (featuring Justin Bieber) | Top Collaboration | Won |
| 2018 | "Despacito" (featuring Justin Bieber) | Top Latin Song | Won |

=== Billboard Latin Music Awards ===
| Year | Nominee / work | Award | Result |
|---|---|---|---|
| 2018 | "Despacito Remix" (featuring Justin Bieber) | Hot Latin Song of the Year | Won |
| 2018 | "Despacito Remix" (featuring Justin Bieber) | Hot Latin Song of the Year | Won |
| 2018 | "Despacito Remix" (featuring Justin Bieber) | Airplay Song of the Year | Won |
| 2018 | "Despacito Remix" (featuring Justin Bieber) | Digital Song of the Year | Won |
| 2018 | "Despacito Remix" (featuring Justin Bieber) | Streaming Song of the Year | Won |
| 2018 | "Despacito Remix" (featuring Justin Bieber) | Latin Pop Song of the Year | Won |
