= Gas Dream =

Studio album by Eligh
- Released: October 3, 2000
- Genre: Alternative hip hop Underground hip hop
- Length: 69:05
- Label: Caravan
- Producer: Eligh

Eligh chronology
Sidewaydaze (1998)	Gas Dream (2000)	Gandalf's Beat Machine (2000)

Professional ratings
Review scores
Source	Rating
AllMusic	3/5 stars

Gas Dream is a studio album by American hip hop artist Eligh, a member of the indie hip hop collective Living Legends. It was released in 2000.

== Critical reception ==
Matt Conaway of AllMusic gave the album a rating of three stars out of five. He wrote, "Eligh is at a crossroads artistically with Gas Dream, as he is torn between the joy of making music to satisfy his creative urges while simultaneously having to deal with industry politics."

== Track listing ==
No.	Title	Length
1.	"A Gas Dreamer's Intro"	4:35
2.	"Actors Have No Friends"	4:43
3.	"Lifesize Puzzle" (featuring Scarub)	5:28
4.	"See the Priest"	4:47
5.	"Forks in the Road"	4:34
6.	"Mingus and Me" (featuring Sunspot Jonz and Luckyiam)	3:06
7.	"Coincidence, Pt.2"	2:57
8.	"A Lesson Garden" (featuring Del the Funky Homosapien)	4:51
9.	"What You Do"	0:11
10.	"Nightlife"	4:16
11.	"Antique Remix" (featuring Basik)	4:36
12.	"Chronic"	4:35
13.	"It's What You Receive"	4:49
14.	"Soul Man" (featuring Pep Love and The Grouch)	4:31
15.	"Mission Complete" (featuring Aesop Fables)	5:09
16.	"A Gas Dreamers Farewell" (featuring Luckyiam)	3:09
17.	"Skit [Untitled Track]"	2:50
Total length:		69:05
