= Show You the World =

Studio album by the Grouch
- Released: April 8, 2008
- Genre: Hip-hop
- Length: 55:28
- Label: Legendary Music
- Producers: DJ Epik; Bloe; The Grouch; Fat Jack; Raphael Saadiq; Eligh; Young Fetty; Style Misia; Daddy Kev; Marty James; Rhythm X

The Grouch chronology
Crusader for Justice (2003)	Show You the World (2008)	Three Eyes Off the Time (2009)

Show You the World is a solo studio album by American hip-hop musician the Grouch. It was released on Legendary Music on April 8, 2008. It peaked at number 31 on the Billboard Heatseekers Albums chart.

== Critical reception ==
Professional ratings
Review scores
Source	Rating
Exclaim!	favorable
PopMatters	5/10 stars
RapReviews.com	7.5/10
The Skinny	4/5 stars
XLR8R	favorable

Scott Ramage of The Skinny gave the album 4 stars out of 5, praising "[the] mix of soulful samples and fresh, honest lyrics." Zoneil Maharaj of XLR8R wrote: "Meticulously crafted, Show You the World is The Grouch's first solo release in five years, serving food for thought over a platter of tight production."

== Track listing ==
No.	Title	Producer(s)	Length
1.	"Microphone Intro"		0:14
2.	"Watch Watch" (featuring Mike Marshall)	DJ Epik; Bloe	3:00
3.	"Clones"	The Grouch	3:52
4.	"Artsy"	The Grouch	3:31
5.	"Favorite Folks"	The Grouch	3:00
6.	"Yardwork"	DJ Epik	2:57
7.	"God Bless the Elephant" (featuring Abstract Rude)	Fat Jack	3:42
8.	"Show You the World" (featuring Raphael Saadiq)	Raphael Saadiq	4:22
9.	"The Bay to LA" (featuring Murs)	Eligh	4:02
10.	"Mom & Pop Killer"	Young Fetty	3:03
11.	"Never Die"	Style Misia	4:13
12.	"Shero"	Daddy Kev	4:17
13.	"Bring It Back"	The Grouch	3:20
14.	"Hot Air Balloons" (featuring Bicasso and Scarub)	The Grouch	4:22
15.	"The Time" (featuring Marty James)	Marty James; Rhythm X	4:18
16.	"Breath"	The Grouch	3:15
Total length:			55:28

== Charts ==
Chart	Peak position
US Heatseekers Albums (Billboard)	31
