= The Gathering (EP) =

EP by Living Legends
- Released: April 8, 2008
- Genre: Hip hop
- Length: 32:03
- Label: Legendary Music
- Producers: Eligh; The Grouch; Bicasso

Living Legends chronology
Classic (2005)	The Gathering (2008)

Professional ratings
Review scores
Source	Rating
AllMusic	favorable
BBC	favorable
Exclaim!	favorable
HipHopDX	mixed
PopMatters	5/10 stars
Tiny Mix Tapes	3.5/5 stars

The Gathering is an EP by American hip hop group Living Legends. It was released on Legendary Music on April 8, 2008. It peaked at number 16 on the Billboard Heatseekers Albums, as well as number 46 on the Independent Albums chart.

== Critical reception ==
Andrea Woo of Exclaim! said: "While some will invariably be disappointed by the short playtime, the seven tracks of The Gathering are strung together with a fairly stable energy to create a solid offering devoid of filler."

== Track listing ==
No.	Title	Producer(s)	Length
1.	"The Gathering"	Eligh	5:18
2.	"She Wants Me"	The Grouch	3:59
3.	"Pants on Fire"	The Grouch	4:16
4.	"War & Peace"	Eligh	3:29
5.	"Luva Changer"	Bicasso	4:02
6.	"Samba"	Bicasso	2:43
7.	"After Hours (Extended Euromix)"	The Grouch	8:20

== Charts ==
Chart	Peak position
US Heatseekers Albums (Billboard)	16
US Independent Albums (Billboard)	46
