= Feldt =

Feldt is a surname. Notable people with the surname include:

- Allan Feldt (born 1963), Danish politician
- Eric Feldt (1899–1968), Australian writer and Navy officer
- Gloria Feldt (born 1942), American author, speaker, commentator and feminist leader
- Kjell-Olof Feldt (1931–2025), Swedish Social Democratic politician
- Kurt Feldt (1897–1970), German general in the Wehrmacht of Nazi Germany during World War II
- Kyle Feldt (born 1992), Australian player
- Lutz Feldt (born 1945), German Inspector of the Navy from 2003 to 2006
- Maarit Feldt-Ranta (1968–2019), Finnish politician
- Marcus Feldt (born 1970), Swedish curler
- Pavel Feldt (1905–1960), Soviet conductor and composer
- Reine Feldt (1945–1986), Swedish footballer and journalist
- Sam Feldt (born 1993), Dutch DJ, record producer and entrepreneur

== See also ==
- Feld
- Felt (disambiguation)
