= One Block Radius =

American hip hop group

- Origin: San Francisco, California, USA
- Genres: Alternative hip hop, soul
- Years active: late 2003–present
- Labels: Avatar, Low Post, Property, Mercury, Def Jam
- Members: Marty James; MDA; Z-Man

One Block Radius is an alternative hip hop group made up of Marty James (vocals, raps, production), MDA (vocals, turntables), and emcee Z-Man (a Hieroglyphics associated rapper). Both Marty James and MDA were part of the group Scapegoat Wax. One Block Radius was formed in late 2003. They have toured and done shows with Hieroglyphics, Maroon 5, Living Legends, Matisyahu, De La Soul, Trick Daddy, Pigeon John, Aceyalone and more. And Marty James also featured in the song called Fantasy Girl with Baby Bash in 2010.

In 2005, One Block Radius released their debut album Long Story Short. It featured a diverse selection of songs ranging from pure pop to straight-up hip-hop. The following year they released a follow-up in the form of a mixtape CD called Cut Some Static. Cut Some Static was an album-length compilation of previously unreleased tracks, but was not released as a proper album. It was not sold at retail, came packaged with home-computer printed labels, and featured members of the band introducing tracks, to keep the underground mixtape feel. Musically, it also featured a grittier, more rap-oriented sound, and more explicit lyrics.

Marty James was featured on the hook of The Federation's 2006 west coast club anthem "I Wear My Stunna Glasses at Night". Since that time he has also become an accomplished writer and producer having worked with JR Rotem, E-40, Far East Movement Sean Kingston, Baby Bash, Paula DeAnda, Diane Warren, Rick Rock, Lil Jon, The Grouch, DJ Felli Fel, Jessi Malay, MoZella, Laze & Royal, The Stooie Brothers and more. In 2007, he co-wrote "What Is It" by Baby Bash ft. Sean Kingston.

In May 2008 One Block Radius released the single "You Got Me" on Property Music Group (Marty James own label). James also produced the song. Their major label debut, One Block Radius spent one week on the Billboard Top R&B/Hip-Hop Albums chart, at number 86.

== Discography ==
=== Albums ===
- Long Story Short 2005
- One Block Radius 2008

=== Mixtapes ===
- Cut Some Static (2006, Low Post Records)

=== Singles ===
- You Got Me: U.S. Pop 100 peak #53 (2008, Property)
