= Felter =

Felter is a surname. Notable people with the surname Felter include:

- Edwin L. Felter (1917–2004), justice of the New Mexico Supreme Court
- Harvey Wickes Felter (1865–1927), American physician
- June Felter (1919–2019), American painter and illustrator
- Marlon Felter (born 1978), Surinamese footballer

== See also ==
- Felt (disambiguation)
