= Almost Famous (Living Legends album) =

Studio album by Living Legends
- Released: October 10, 2001
- Genre: Alternative hip-hop
- Length: 72:52
- Label: Legendary Music
- Producer: Eligh; The Grouch; Sunspot Jonz

Living Legends chronology
Almost Famous (2001)	Creative Differences (2004)

Singles from Almost Famous
- 1. "Gotta Question for Ya / Night Prowler / Forces of Nature" Released: 2001

Professional ratings
Review scores
Source	Rating
The A.V. Club	favorable
The Badger Herald	favorable

Almost Famous is the debut studio album by American hip-hop group Living Legends. It was released in October 10, 2001. It peaked at number 28 on the CMJ Hip-Hop chart.

== Critical reception ==
Nathan Rabin of The A.V. Club gave the album a favorable review, saying: "Living Legends' grandiose moniker may be ironic and self-deprecating, but Almost Famous should go a long way toward establishing the members of this oversized crew as legitimate underground hip-hop heroes."

== Track listing ==
No.	Title	Producer(s)	Length
1.	"Gotta Question for Ya"	Eligh	5:13
2.	"Night Prowler" (featuring Slug)	The Grouch	4:00
3.	"That Looks Good"	Eligh	4:35
4.	"Black Glass"	The Grouch	3:55
5.	"Rabbit Hole"	Eligh	4:24
6.	"Common Ground" (featuring JC)	The Grouch	4:44
7.	"Flawless"	Eligh	6:33
8.	"What Would I Be" (featuring N8 the GR8 and Krush)	Eligh	4:02
9.	"Anything You Want"	Sunspot Jonz	3:26
10.	"Gift Wrap"	The Grouch	4:38
11.	"War Games"	Eligh	4:23
12.	"Forces of Nature"	Eligh	4:34
13.	"Osaka Tales"	The Grouch	4:42
14.	"Soap Boxin"	The Grouch	4:11
15.	"Not Here" (featuring Pep Love and Jo Wilkinson)	The Grouch	5:06
16.	"Nothing Less" (featuring Slug)	The Grouch	4:26
