= Creative Differences =

Studio album by Living Legends
- Released: April 6, 2004
- Genre: Alternative hip-hop
- Length: 77:01
- Label: Legendary Music
- Producer: Eligh; The Grouch; Scarub; Hektic; Bicasso; Sunspot Jonz; The A.M.

Living Legends chronology
| Almost Famous (2001) | Creative Differences (2004) | Classic (2005) |

Singles from Creative Differences
- 1. "Awakening / Fill My Drink Up" Released: 2004; 2. "Damn It Feels Good / Whatizit?" Released: 2004

Professional ratings
Review scores
| Source | Rating |
|---|---|
| AllMusic | 4/5 stars |
| RapReviews.com | 8.5/10 |
| Tiny Mix Tapes | 4/5 stars |
| XLR8R | favorable |

Creative Differences is a studio album by American hip-hop group Living Legends. It was released in 2004. The album cover is a reference to The Brady Bunch. It peaked at number 28 on the Billboard Independent Albums chart.

== Critical reception ==
Stewart Mason of AllMusic gave the album 4 stars out of 5, saying, "early De La Soul's pop-culture giggles, Digital Underground's playful rudeness, A Tribe Called Quest's cross-cultural fearlessness, Public Enemy's sonic fingerprints and the no-rules aesthetic of the Wu-Tang Clan are all touched upon at different points in this sprawling masterwork."

== Track listing ==
| No. | Title | Producer(s) | Length |
|---|---|---|---|
| 1. | "Creative Differences" | Eligh | 6:18 |
| 2. | "Fill My Drink Up" | The Grouch | 4:24 |
| 3. | "Addicted" | Eligh | 1:38 |
| 4. | "Time to Ride" | Scarub | 3:56 |
| 5. | "Days Go By" | Eligh | 4:30 |
| 6. | "Damn It Feels Good" | The Grouch | 4:29 |
| 7. | "Awakening" | Hektic | 1:52 |
| 8. | "Get It in Your Soul" | Bicasso | 4:39 |
| 9. | "No Strings" | The Grouch | 3:43 |
| 10. | "It Might Be You" | Sunspot Jonz | 3:20 |
| 11. | "Real Slow the Fast Way" | Eligh | 5:25 |
| 12. | "Whatizit?" | Eligh | 4:59 |
| 13. | "How You Take It" | Scarub | 3:51 |
| 14. | "Trust Me?" | The A.M. | 4:34 |
| 15. | "Friends Are Calling" | Eligh | 4:10 |
| 16. | "Hold Your Own" | The Grouch | 4:34 |
| 17. | "Aspirations" | Eligh | 5:07 |

== Charts ==
| Chart | Peak position |
|---|---|
| US Independent Albums (Billboard) | 28 |
