= 3 Melancholy Gypsys =

American hip hop group

- Also known as: 3MG
- Origin: Los Angeles, California, U.S.
- Genres: Hip hop
- Years active: 1994–present
- Labels: Legendary Music; Mary Joy Recordings
- Member of: Living Legends
- Spinoffs: Log Cabin; The Righteous Brothers
- Members: Eligh; Murs; Scarub
- Website: legendarymusic.net

3 Melancholy Gypsys is an American hip hop group from Los Angeles, California. It consists of Eligh, Murs, and Scarub.

== History ==
Eligh, Murs, and Scarub went to Alexander Hamilton High School. After forming 3 Melancholy Gypsys, they were incorporated into the crews Log Cabin and The Righteous Brothers. Until Log Cabin disbanded, the trio worked on music as 3 Melancholy Gypsys and Log Cabin for a while. Around 1995, the three would meet again and reunite in Oakland at the Outhouse where the Living Legends crew was taking shape.

== Discography ==
=== Studio albums ===
- Gypsy's Luck (1998)
- Grand Caravan to the Rim of the World (2005)

=== Live albums ===
- Live in Tokyo (2000)

=== EPs ===
- Bac for No Good Reason (1996) (split with Murs)
- Comurshul (1996) (split with Murs)
- The Penguins (1998)
- A Gypsy Farewell (2025)

=== Guest appearances ===
- Murs - "Done Deal" from The End of the Beginning (2002)
- Mums the Word - "Follow the Path" from Constant Evolution (2005)

=== Compilation appearances ===
- "Low Key" on Tags of the Times 3 (2001)
- "Aspirations" on Creative Differences (2004)
- "F**k You Up" on Walk Like a Man (2005)
- "2010" on Legendary Music Volume 1 (2006)
