= Felt (disambiguation) =

Felt is a non-woven cloth that is produced by matting, condensing, and pressing fibers.

Felt may also refer to:

== Places ==
- Felt, Idaho, an unincorporated community in Teton County, Idaho, US
- Felt, Oklahoma, a small community in Cimarron County, Oklahoma, US
- Cape Felt, on the Bakutis Coast of Marie Byrd Land, Antarctica

== Music ==
- Felt (band), an English rock band
- Felt (hip hop group), an American underground hip hop duo
  - Felt: A Tribute to Christina Ricci, first album by Felt
  - Felt 2: A Tribute to Lisa Bonet, second album by Felt
  - Felt 3: A Tribute to Rosie Perez, third album by Felt
- Felt (Anchor & Braille album), 2009
- Felt (Nils Frahm album), 2011
- Felt (The Chain Gang of 1974 album), 2017

== People ==
- Felt family, a US family of politicians
- Richard Felt (1933–2012), college and AFL football defensive back
- Dorr Felt (1862–1930), inventor of the Comptometer, an early computing device
- Edward P. Felt (1959–2001), a victim of the September 11, 2001 attacks aboard United Airlines Flight 93
- Ephraim Porter Felt (1868–1943), American entomologist specialised in Diptera
- Harry D. Felt (1902–1992), American aviator in World War II and commander in chief of Pacific Command
- Irving Mitchell Felt (1910–1994), American businessman
- John H. Felt (1867–1938), architect and founder of J.H. Felt & Company
- Louie B. Felt (1850–1928), Church of Jesus Christ of Latter-day Saints (Mormon) personality
- Mark Felt (ne William Mark Felt, Sr., 1913–2008), the senior FBI special agent and Watergate scandal informant called "Deep Throat"
- Nathaniel H. Felt (1816–1887), politician and The Church of Jesus Christ of Latter-day Saints (Mormon) personality
- Reuben William Felt (1903-1949), American politician and farmer
- Robert Felt (1953–2002), computer programmer, National Scrabble Championship-winner
- Ulrike Felt (born 1957), Austrian social scientist

== Other uses ==
- Felt and Tarrant Manufacturing Company, manufacturer of the Comptometer desk calculator
- Felt Bicycles, an American bicycle manufacturer
- Roofing felt (asphalt felt), felt paper coated with asphalt bitumen for waterproofing roofs
- Marker pen, or felt tip pen, a writing instrument
- Felt sense, and felt shift, a kind of awareness in Focusing (psychotherapy)
- Felt (Re:Zero), a character in the light novel series Re:Zero − Starting Life in Another World
- Felt (GIS company), American Geographic Information Systems company

== See also ==
- Felts (disambiguation)
- Felted, densely packed or tangled hairy or otherwise filamentous material
