= Earthtones =

Earthtones may refer to:

- Earthtones (Bahamas album)
- Earthtones (Crown City Rockers album)
- Earth tones
