= Grand Caravan to the Rim of the World =

Studio album by 3 Melancholy Gypsys
- Released: June 28, 2005
- Recorded: 2004
- Genre: Hip hop
- Length: 68:07
- Label: Legendary Music
- Producer: Eligh; Murs; Scarub; Belief; Magi

3 Melancholy Gypsys chronology
| Gypsy's Luck (1998) | Grand Caravan to the Rim of the World (2005) |

Professional ratings
Review scores
| Source | Rating |
|---|---|
| Hip Hop Core | 4/5 stars |

Grand Caravan to the Rim of the World is the second studio album by the American hip hop group 3 Melancholy Gypsys. It was released on Legendary Music in 2005.

== Track listing ==
| No. | Title | Producer(s) | Length |
|---|---|---|---|
| 1. | "Intro" | Eligh | 1:11 |
| 2. | "Halo" | Eligh | 4:13 |
| 3. | "Young Man" | Eligh | 4:09 |
| 4. | "The Plannit" | Eligh | 5:48 |
| 5. | "Signs" | Murs | 3:58 |
| 6. | "Nautilus" | Eligh | 3:56 |
| 7. | "Interlude" | Eligh | 0:56 |
| 8. | "And If" | Scarub | 4:21 |
| 9. | "Color Blue" | Eligh | 4:05 |
| 10. | "Chant" | Eligh | 3:28 |
| 11. | "3 Rings" | Murs | 4:38 |
| 12. | "Countdown" | Murs; Belief | 3:07 |
| 13. | "Interlude" | Eligh | 0:13 |
| 14. | "Beautiful Mind" | Eligh | 5:19 |
| 15. | "3 Men Marching" | Eligh | 4:53 |
| 16. | "Armageddon" | Eligh | 4:04 |
| 17. | "Landing" | Magi | 3:57 |
| 18. | "Child 2 Man" | Eligh | 5:51 |
| Total length: | | | 68:07 |

== Personnel ==
Credits adapted from liner notes.

- Eligh – vocals, production (1–4, 6, 7, 9, 10, 13–16, 18)
- Murs – vocals, production (5, 11, 12)
- Scarub – vocals, production (8)
- Ringmaster Roc – vocals (11)
- Belief – production (12)
- Jo Wilkinson – vocals (15)
- Magi – production (17)
- Mystic – vocals (18)
