= Felt 4 U =

Studio album by Felt
- Released: August 7, 2020
- Genre: Hip-hop
- Length: 40:00
- Label: Rhymesayers Entertainment
- Producer: Ant

Felt chronology
Felt 3: A Tribute to Rosie Perez (2009)	Felt 4 U (2020)

Felt 4 U is the fourth studio album by Felt, an American hip-hop duo made up of Murs and Slug. Entirely produced by Ant, it was released by Rhymesayers Entertainment in 2020.

== Critical reception ==
Professional ratings
Review scores
Source	Rating
Underground Hip Hop Blog	8/10
Raw Side Hip Hop	8.5/10
Rapreviews.com	10/10

The album received mostly favorable reviews, with Ant's production in particular being praised.

Legends Will Never Die of Underground Hip Hop Blog gave the album a 8/10, saying: "Ant absolutely kills it on the boards whereas both MURS & Slug both [sic] sound like they never left because the way they compliment each other is still as fantastic as ever." A review on HipHopGoldenAge noted that while Murs and Slug deliver "confident displays of mature lyricism", it's Ant's "smooth instrumentals that steal the show", heralding his production as being "among the best work he has ever done."

Raw Side Hip Hop gave the album a 8.5/10, saying: "Hard to fault really. The production is really enjoyable and the vibe created by these emcees is hypnotic. Add this to your 'Best Albums of 2020' list now."

Rapreviews.com gave the album a perfect 10/10, saying: "It would all be worth it to hear any song from this set live, and that's the funny thing about time — it's all about the memories you made along the way. Felt 4 U makes some damn good ones."

== Track listing ==
All tracks are written by Felt (Sean Daley and Nicholas Carter) except where noted.

No.	Title	Writer(s)	Length
1.	"Never's Enough"		3:40
2.	"Find My Way"		3:38
3.	"Don't Do Me Like That"		3:18
4.	"Trees"		3:24
5.	"Through the Night"		2:26
6.	"Freeze Tag"		2:23
7.	"Sticks & Stones"		3:04
8.	"Underwater" (featuring Blimes)	Felt, Blimes	3:09
9.	"Alexander F'Real"		3:19
10.	"Hologram" (featuring Aesop Rock and The Grouch)	Felt, Aesop Rock, The Grouch	4:28
11.	"Crimson Skies" (featuring Shepard Albertson)	Felt, Shepard Albertson	3:46
12.	"Borboleta"		3:48
Total length:			40:00
