= Nicola Conte =

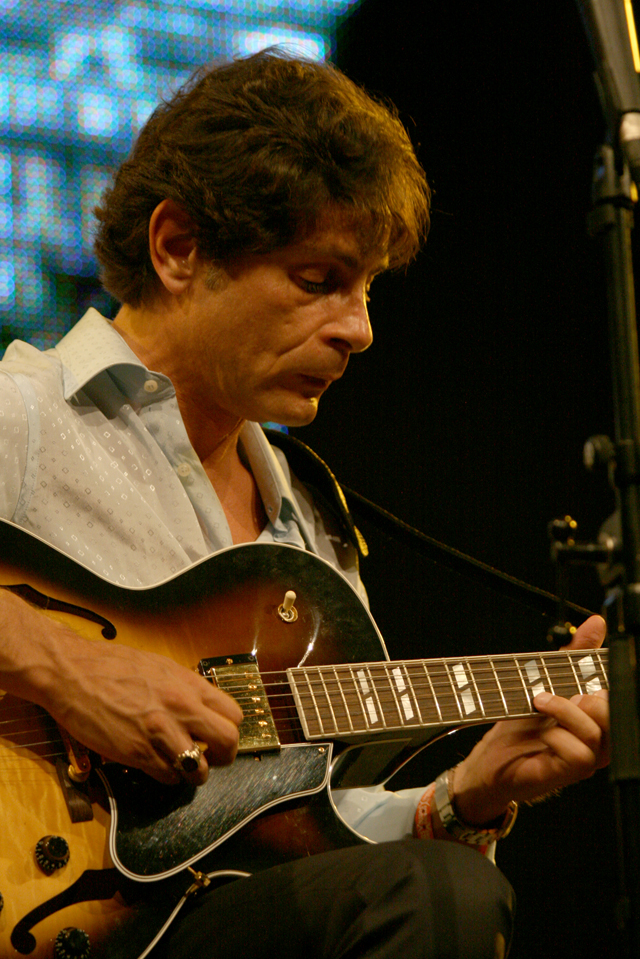
- Nicola Conte (2008)

Background information
- Born: Bari, Apulia, Italy
- Genres: Bossa nova, acid jazz, jazz fusion, Latin jazz, world music
- Occupations: Musician, composer, producer, DJ, bandleader
- Instrument: Guitar
- Labels: Schema, ESL, Blue Note
- Website: www.nicolaconte.it

Nicola Conte (born 1962, Bari, Italy) is an Italian DJ, producer, guitarist, arranger and bandleader, known initially for introducing an innovative style of acid jazz that incorporates bossa nova themes, melodies drawn from Italian film scores of the 1960s, easy listening themes, and traditional Indian music. His Latin jazz focus is evident on his albums Other Directions (2004, Blue Note & Schema) and Rituals (2008, Schema), and remixes he has done for contemporaries across genres.

Conte, a classically trained musician, is a part of what was known as The Fez Collective, based in the Apulian city of Bari, and the Idizioni-Ishtar/Schema Records, a record label known for promoting a distinctly Italian approach to acid jazz as well as jazz music as a whole.

Conte's first album was Jet Sounds (2000). The single "Bossa Per Due" gained international recognition and was an underground hit. It was used within a short time for a prime-time commercial for Acura automobiles. In 2002, the title track also gained recognition in the United States after it was used in two popular commercial advertisements for Joe Boxer underwear being sold by K-Mart stores. The album was licensed for US distribution by Thievery Corporation's Eighteenth Street Lounge (ESL) label in the summer of 2001 as Bossa Per Due (2001), and was a slightly reconfigured version of the Italian Jet Sounds album. This was followed by the remix album Jet Sounds Revisited (2002).

Two years later, Blue Note's French subsidiary released Conte's next album Other Directions (2004). Conte released his next album, Rituals (2008). Conte released The Modern Sound of Nicola Conte – Versions in Jazz-Dub (2009) on Schema Records. Unlike his 2002 remix album, which featured artists largely reworking his songs, this two-CD set had Nicola releasing original titles and featured some of his jazz-style remixes of other people's works. His album Love & Revolution (2011) was released on a deluxe two-CD set, and a standard single CD by Universal Classics and Jazz, while the album Free Souls (2014) was released on Schema.

Conte has also produced albums by other artists, including Paolo Achenza Trio (album Ombre, 1997), Rosalia De Souza (album Garota Moderna, 2008), Stefania Di Pierro (album Natural, 2016), and Marvin Parks (album Marvin Parks, 2017).

== Discography ==
- 2000 Jet Sounds (Schema, 2000)
- 2001 Bossa Per Due [Jet Sounds retitled reissue] (ESL, 2001)
- 2002 Jet Sounds Revisited (Schema, 2002)
- 2004 Other Directions (Schema/Blue Note, 2004)
- 2008 Rituals (Schema, 2008)
- 2008 Nicola Conte presents Spiritual Swingers ... Deep, Afrocentric, Modal Jazz from Universal Music Archives (Universal Music, 2008)
- 2009 The Modern Sound of Nicola Conte (Schema, 2009)
- 2011 Love & Revolution (Impulse!/Universal Italy, 2011)
- 2011 Free Souls (Schema, 2014)
- 2014 Nicola Conte presents Mystic Prestige ... Deep, Afrocentric, Modal Jazz from Prestige Archives (Universal Classics & Jazz, 2014)
- 2015 Nicola Conte presents Blue Note Tribe ... Deep, Afrocentric, Modal Jazz from Blue Note Archives (Universal Classics & Jazz, 2015)
- 2016 Nicola Conte Presents Stefania Dipierro Natural (Far Out Recordings, 2016)
- 2018 Let Your Light Shine On (MPS, 2018)
- 2024 Do You Feel Like I Feel (Schema, 2024) with Gregory Porter
- 2026 Universo Astratto (Schema, 2026) with Tema Due
