= Classic (Living Legends album) =

Studio album by Living Legends
- Released: March 8, 2005
- Genre: Alternative hip-hop
- Length: 60:48
- Label: Legendary Music
- Producers: DJ Epik; Eligh; Goldfingaz; Madlib; DJ Khalil; Bean One; The Grouch; Kruse; Sunspot Jonz

Living Legends chronology
Creative Differences (2004)	Classic (2005)	The Gathering (2008)

Singles from Classic
- 1. "Blast Your Radio" Released: 2004; 2. "Down for Nothin' / Brand New" Released: 2005; 3. "Never Fallin' / Good Fun" Released: 2005

Professional ratings
Review scores
Source	Rating
BMR	4/5 stars
Exclaim!	mixed
Exclaim!	favorable
PopMatters	7/10 stars
Prefix	7.0/10
XLR8R	favorable

Classic is a studio album by American hip-hop group Living Legends. It was released on Legendary Music in 2005. It peaked at number 26 on the Billboard Heatseekers Albums, as well as number 38 on the Independent Albums chart.

== Critical reception ==
Dan Nishimoto of PopMatters gave the album 7 stars out of 10, saying: "While Classic never aspires to unify itself around a common theme or the such, it sounds and feels whole because of the common spirit with which each MC approaches their verses." Meanwhile, Dalia Cohen of Exclaim! said: "This is an album that would probably sound dope at a live venue with the energy and vibe that Living Legends would bring to the stage, but for at home listening the mad flows of each emcee gets lost in the background."

== Track listing ==
No.	Title	Producer(s)	Length
1.	"Intro"	DJ Epik	3:23
2.	"It's Us"	Eligh	5:34
3.	"Blast Your Radio"	Madlib	3:52
4.	"Brand New"	DJ Khalil	4:18
5.	"Good Fun" (featuring Nara)	Bean One	4:17
6.	"Busted"	The Grouch	3:47
7.	"Never Fallin'"	DJ Khalil	5:22
8.	"Tears and Pain (Neverendingstreets)"	Eligh	4:37
9.	"The Horn Song"	The Grouch	4:58
10.	"Wise Is the Way"	Eligh	4:01
11.	"Even Though"	Bean One	4:10
12.	"The Deepest Breath" (featuring Laneka and Nara)	Kruse	4:28
13.	"Down for Nothin'"	Eligh	3:58
14.	"Man Who Sold the World Pt. 2"	Sunspot Jonz	3:35
15.	"After I'm Gone"	Eligh	6:08

== Charts ==
Chart	Peak position
US Heatseekers Albums (Billboard)	26
US Independent Albums (Billboard)	38

== Personnel ==
- Evren Göknar - Mastering Engineer
