= Say G&E! =

Studio album by The Grouch & Eligh
- Released: April 21, 2009
- Genre: Hip hop
- Length: 64:03
- Label: Legendary Music
- Producer: Eligh, Flying Lotus, Amp Live, Rick Rock

The Grouch & Eligh chronology
No More Greener Grasses (2003)	Say G&E! (2009)	The Tortoise and the Crow (2014)

Singles from Say G&E!
- 1. "All In" Released: 2009

Professional ratings
Review scores
Source	Rating
AllMusic	favorable
Exclaim!	favorable
PopMatters	8/10 stars
Potholes in My Blog	3.5/5 stars

Say G&E! is a studio album by American hip hop duo The Grouch & Eligh. It was released on Legendary Music in 2009. It peaked at number 186 on the Billboard 200 chart, as well as number 81 on the Top R&B/Hip-Hop Albums chart, number 5 on the Heatseekers Albums chart, and number 23 on the Independent Albums chart.

== Critical reception ==
Andrew Martin of PopMatters gave the album 8 stars out of 10, describing it as "one of this year's strongest and most balanced hip-hop releases to date." Nate Knaebel of AllMusic said: "The tracks here are infectious and bang as hard as they want to, but they also show an artistry and intelligence you're just not going to get in the mainstream."

== Track listing ==
No.	Title	Producer(s)	Length
1.	"Intro" (featuring Mystic)	Eligh	2:51
2.	"Say G&E!"	Eligh	4:22
3.	"Push On (Push Up)"	Eligh	3:49
4.	"Old Souls" (featuring Blu)	Flying Lotus	4:11
5.	"Boom" (featuring Slug)	Amp Live	4:05
6.	"Denial"	Rick Rock	4:45
7.	"I Know You Wanna Feel"	Eligh	5:25
8.	"Teach Me the Way"	Eligh	3:32
9.	"All In" (featuring Gift of Gab and Pigeon John)	Eligh	4:53
10.	"Do It Again" (featuring DJ Fresh)	Eligh	3:44
11.	"Rivers Run Dry"	Eligh	5:10
12.	"No Flowers" (featuring Paris Hayes)	Eligh	3:48
13.	"Comin' Up" (featuring Mistah F.A.B.)	Eligh	4:04
14.	"Worried About the World" (featuring Mike Marshall and Sage Francis)	Eligh	4:56
15.	"Sign of the Times" (featuring Mark Bell)	Eligh	4:28

== Personnel ==
- Evren Göknar - Mastering Engineer

== Charts ==
Chart	Peak position
US Billboard 200	186
US Top R&B/Hip-Hop Albums (Billboard)	81
US Heatseekers Albums (Billboard)	5
US Independent Albums (Billboard)	23
