= Feld =

Feld is a surname of German origin. The name means "field" in English.

- Feld Entertainment, entertainment company formed by Israel and Irvin Feld

== People ==
- A. Spencer Feld (1891–1987), New York politician
- Bernard T. Feld (1919–1993), American physicist
- Brad Feld (born 1965), American venture capitalist
- Donald Lee Feld, better known as Donfeld (1934–2007), American costume designer
- Fritz Feld (1900–1993), German-American actor
- Irvin Feld, co-founder of an American entertainment company
- Jindřich Feld (1925–2007), Czech composer
- Judy Feld Carr (born 1938), Canadian musicologist and Jewish activist
- Kenneth Feld (born 1948), American entertainment entrepreneur
- Mark Feld, better known under his stage name Marc Bolan (1947–1977), English musician with T.Rex
- Mathilde Feld (born 1969), French politician
- Val Feld (1947–2001), Welsh politician

== Fictional characters ==
- Zieg Feld, a character in The Legend of Dragoon
- Dart Feld, a character in The Legend of Dragoon

== See also ==
- Feld (restaurant), in Chicago, United States
- Feld-Tai reciprocity or Feld-Tai reciprocity theorem; in Reciprocity (electromagnetism)
- Feldt
- Felt (disambiguation)
