= Schema Records =

- Founded: 1997
- Founder: Luciano Cantone, Davide Rosa
- Genre: Jazz
- Country of origin: Italy
- Location: Milan
- Official website: www.ishtar.it

Schema Records is a prominent Italian record label in Milan, Italy, that specializes in jazz, Brazilian, and Latin-influenced music. Schema is a sublabel of Ishtar, a recording and publishing company based in Milan, which runs the sublabels Schema Rearward, Sensible, Summer Dawn, Big Sur Recordings and Milano 2000.

Schema was founded in 1997 by Luciano Cantone and Davide Rosa. Their catalogue includes music by Alessandro Magnanini, Balanco, Benny Bailey, Eraldo Volonté, Gerardo Frisina, Giorgio Azzolini, Johnny Griffin, Kenny Clarke/Francy Boland Big Band, Les Hommes, Mario Biondi, Neos, Nicola Conte, Piero Umiliani, Pietro Ciancaglini, Quartetto di Lucca, Rosalia de Souza, Sahib Shibab, Soulstance, Steve Evans, Marvin Parks, and Toco.

== Artists ==
- Artless
- Balanço
- Beat Out Shrine
- Cabaret Noir
- Charles Hilton Brown
- Combogranata
- Conte & Petrella
- Doctor Abstract
- Drumagick
- Ella & The Bossa Beat
- Fez Combo
- Fragmentorchestra
- Gerardo Frisina
- Il Trio Di Romano Mussolini
- Intensive Jazz Sextet
- Les Hommes
- Lorenzo Tucci
- Mario Biondi
- Marvin Parks
- Neos
- Nicola Conte
- P. Fedreghini and M. Bianchi
- Paolo Achenza Trio
- Paolo Fedreghini
- Quartetto Lo Greco
- Quartetto Moderno
- Quintetto Lo Greco
- Quintetto X
- Rosalia de Souza
- Rosario Giuliani Quartetto
- S-Tone Inc.
- Schema Sextet
- Soulstance
- Steve Evans
- Street Jazz Unit
- The Cabildo's Three
- The Dining Rooms
- The Invisible Session
- The Jazz Convention
- Toco
- Vuca
- Was a Bee
