= Nico Lahs =

Italian DJ and record producer (born 1987)

- Born: 1987 (age 38–39)
- Origin: Bari, Apulia, Italy
- Genre: Deep house
- Occupations: DJ; record producer
- Years active: 2008–present
- Labels: U FIT; Mistress Recordings; NDATL Muzik; Moods & Grooves; Undaground Therapy Muzik; Local Talk; Metamorphic Recordings; Ovum Recordings
- Member of: Tema Due

Nico Lahs (born 1987), birth name Nicola Loporchio, is an Italian DJ and record producer born and based in Bari, Italy, and known known for his genre-spanning and eclectic DJ sets and contaminated deep house productions. He is owner of the U FIT record label, and member of the group Tema Due with Nicola Conte. His releases have appeared on labels including Ovum Recordings, Metamorphic Recordings, Delusions of Grandeur, Moods & Grooves, Undaground Therapy Muzik, NDATL Muzik, and Mistress Recordings.

== Biography ==
Nico Lahs’ musical journey started as a DJ at a young age, collecting records and cultivating a deep love for house music and beyond. Early on, he displayed a curiosity for unusual and genre-defying sounds, a trait that would evolve into a signature element of both his productions and DJ sets.

Nico Lahs began crafting deep house grooves and issuing records in 2009. His 2011 EP Clouded Visions, released by Josh Wink’s Ovum Recordings, was his fourth release within roughly a year. Reviewing the record, Resident Advisor highlighted its detailed production, weighty low end and references to early-1990s house music.

In 2016, he launched a new side project, Cosmic Garden, alongside the launch of the Cosmic Rhythm label, exploring more dreamy sounds rooted in Italo house, jazz, and vintage house textures.

In 2020, Nico returned to his primary alias and released his debut album, Freedom, through the Beijing-based label Adeen Records. The double LP moved beyond a strictly club-focused approach, drawing on jazz, downtempo and hip-hop influences alongside house and electronic music. That same year, he released three new EPs on Jimpster's Delusions of Grandeur, Dan Curtin's Metamorphic Recordings, and Brooklyn's Dailysession Records.

From 2022 to 2025, Nico released remixes for Alton Miller and Amp Fiddler on Adeen Records, and releases on Mike Grant's Moods & Grooves, Omena, Phonogramme, Selections. Roy Davis Jr.’s Undaground Therapy Muzik, Quintessentials, D3 Elements, Housewax, Kai Alcé’s NDATL Muzik, and Local Talk.

In 2023, Lahs launched the Italian record label U FIT, inaugurating it with two EPs, Distant Shadows and Possibilities.

In 2024, he also embarked on another creative journey with the launch of Tema Due, a collaborative project by Nico Lahs and Nicola Conte. Its first two EPs, released in 2025, introduced a sound built around African and tribal percussion within electronic arrangements. In 2026, the project released its debut full-length album, Universo Astratto, as a double LP on Schema Records. The record features vocal and instrumental contributions from artists including Lalin St. Juste, Nina Miranda, Siya Makuzeni and Toco.

== Style ==
Nico Lahs' production and DJ sets are primarily rooted in deep house, drawing direct stylistic influence from early Chicago house and Detroit techno alongside contemporary European electronic aesthetics. His tracks and DJ sets routinely incorporate elements across jazz, soul, funk, disco, broken beat, dub, techno, and minimal techno. Music critics often note his reliance on analog synthesisers, warm basslines, and intricate syncopated percussion patterns. Rather than relying on abrupt drops, his arrangements typically unfold through slow-building progressions, atmospheric pads, and rhythmic layering.

== Discography ==
=== Albums ===
- Freedom (Adeen Records, 2020)
- Universo Astratto — with Tema Due (Schema Records, 2026)

=== Singles and EPs ===
- Clouded Visions (Ovum Recordings, 2011)
- Sunday 65 (Ovum Recordings, 2012)
- My Side E.P. (Poker Flat Recordings, 2012)
- Absence (Ovum Recordings, 2014)
- Off The Rails (Rawax, 2015)
- Visions (Dailysession Records, 2020)
- Blow Your Mind (Metamorphic Recordings, 2020)
- Got Me Coming Back EP (Delusions Of Grandeur, 2021)
- Innermoods (Moods & Grooves, 2022)
- Fundamentals (Phonogramme, 2022)
- Step Into The Future EP (Selections., 2022)
- Ancestors Call (Part 1) (Omena, 2023)
- Ancestors Call (Part 2) (Omena, 2023)
- Distant Shadows (U FIT, 2023)
- Possibilities (U FIT, 2023)
- Holy Day (Undaground Therapy Muzik, 2023)
- Easy Loving You (Quintessentials, 2023)
- Luv You The Right Way (Housewax, 2025)
- Signals From Outer Space / Crusin' (Local Talk, 2025)
- Over Me EP (NDATL Muzik, 2025)
- EP 1 — with Tema Due (Schema Records, 2025)
- EP 2 — with Tema Due (Schema Records, 2025)
- Do What U Feel (U FIT, 2025)
- Mistress 19 (Mistress Recordings, 2026)

=== Compilations ===
- Makeup - The Edits (Compiled by Camille & Chez Damier / Edited and Mixed by Nico Lahs) (Adeen Records, 2021)
- Make Up The Edits 3 (Compiled by Camille & Chez Damier / Edited and Mixed by Nico Lahs) (Adeen Records, 2023)
- Make Up The Edits 4 (Compiled by Camille & Chez Damier / Edited by Nico Lahs) (Adeen Records, 2024)
- Make Up The Edits 5 (Compiled by Camille & Chez Damier / Edited by Nico Lahs) (Adeen Records, 2026)
