= Avatar Records =

Independent record label

- Founded: 1987
- Founder: Larry Robinson
- Distributor(s): AvatarDigi (Digital); E1 Entertainment (US); Pinnacle (UK); PIAS (Europe); Kartel (Poland); JVC (Japan); Venus (Italy)
- Genre: Hip hop, house, rock, world, alternative, R&B, Latin
- Official website: avatarrecords.com

Avatar Records is an independent record label and management company founded by Larry Robinson with offices in Los Angeles and London, England. The company was founded in 1987 in the garage of his family home in South Los Angeles. Albums released the Oz soundtrack, Planet Asia, Fear of a Black Hat soundtrack, Bishop Don Magic Juan, the NVA Straight from the Crates compilation, and the soundtrack to the television show Girlfriends. Avatar has digitally distributed over three hundred record labels with songs by Anya Marina, Metallica, Bruce Springsteen, Wu-Tang Clan, Mary J. Blige, Amy Winehouse, Erykah Badu.

== History ==
=== Early years: 1987–1996 ===
Larry Robinson started Avatar as a music publishing company in the mid-1980s, and opened its first office on the corner of Sunset & Vine street in Hollywood in 1989. Avatar publishes songs recorded by artists including Tony Toni Tone, DMX, Brandy, Tupac, Redman, Foxy Brown, Vanessa Williams, Bell Biv Devoe, Patti LaBelle, Boyz II Men, Ja Rule, Guy, Vinx, Keith Murray, and others. The company licenses music it owns into film and television programs and commercials. Avatar administers and collects royalties around the world through a network of leading publishers on behalf of their writer and publishing partners. In 1999 Avatar bought the Whole Nine Yards music publishing catalog which owned the musical copyrights to songs recorded by many R&B recording artists.

Avatar's initial releases were released under a label deal with PolyGram Records' subsidiary Polydor. In 1994 Avatar released the soundtrack to Rusty Cundieff's cult film "Fear of a Black Hat". The soundtrack featured the song, "Ice Froggy Frog" a parody of Snoop Dogg's "What's My Name". In 1995, Avatar released "Pump Ya Fist", the rap companion album to Mario Van Peebles film Panther. This compilation featured newly recorded exclusive tracks by The Fugees, Tupac, KRS-One, Chuck D, Grand Puba, and others. A KRS-One track "Ah Yeah" was the lead single from the compilation. Rapper Rakim recorded the song "Shades of Black" (produced by Easy Moe Bee) for the compilation which was named as one of the "50 Incredible Rap Songs You Need to Hear (Right Now)". Avatar donated $10,000 each to the Huey P. Newton Foundation and the Geronimo Pratt Legal Defense Fund. In 1996 Avatar released the debut album of R&B group Goodfellaz which spawned the Top 25 Billboard hit single "Sugar Honey Ice Tea".

== Notable releases ==
One of Avatar's most successful releases was the soundtrack to the hit HBO series OZ. The soundtrack featured the hit single "Behind The Walls" by Kurupt & Nate Dogg. The song reached #1 status at over 20 radio stations in the US. The soundtrack also featured newly recorded music by Snoop Dogg, Styles & Jadakiss, Master P, Cypress Hill, Wu-Tang Clan and many others. A video for "Behind The Walls" directed by Gregory Dark garnered airplay at MTV and BET. The OZ Soundtrack remains the second highest selling soundtrack to an HBO TV series (second only to The Sopranos soundtrack). Simultaneous with the release of the OZ Soundtrack, Avatar Records donated $10,000 to the Innocence Project, a non-profit organization which seeks to gain freedom for wrongfully convicted prisoners through DNA testing.

Avatar released Grammy nominee Planet Asia's 2004 solo debut album "The Grand Opening". The album featured the singles "Right or Wrong", "Its All Big" and "Pure Coke" featuring Martin Luther. Planet Asia's album was chosen as the Best Indie Release of 2004 by The Source magazine. Another Planet Asia track "G's & Soldiers" featuring Kurupt was featured in the MGM film Be Cool (film) "Be Cool" starring John Travolta.

Avatar recording artists One Block Radius released their debut album "Long Story Short" in 2006 in the US and in 2007 in Europe. OBR's single "Black Mercedes" was released in the UK in May 2007 and received airplay on UK radio stations including BBC, BBBC London, BBC Radio Ulster, BBC Radio 2 and other major stations. OBR's lead singer Marty James was featured on the underground single "Stunna Glasses" by the group The Federation.

Legendary pimp turned preacher Bishop Don Magic Juan released a compilation of old school R&B love songs on Avatar in 2006 entitled "Green is for the Money, Gold is For the Honeys Vol. 1". The album featured songs by Willie Hutch, William DeVaughn, The Chi-Lites, The Temptations, Peabo Bryson and many others. Bishop is heard "Skinin Game" in between the songs on the album. Bishop Don Magic Juan is best known for giving up pimping for life as a preacher and spiritual advisor to many well known celebrities. In 2010, superstar DJ Benny Benassi sampled Bishop's voice to record a mashup dance single entitled "A Pimp & A Prostitute".

Avatar released the underground hip hop compilation National Vinyl Association Straight From The Crates Vol. 1 in April 2004. This project, conceived as a tribute to the hip hop DJ and vinyl records, featured Mos Def, Pharcyde featuring Jurassic 5, Blackmoon, Rakaa and Babu of Dilated Peoples, Phil da Agony and Planet Asia, Joey Zozza featuring D12, and Grouch and Ely.

Avatar released Colorado-based artists Deux Process in 2006. The album, In Deux Time featured the singles "Take the Dance" and "The Process".

In 2009 Avatar released the soundtrack to the long running CW Network television show "Girlfriends" which featured an all female lineup of singers including Jill Scott, Chaka Khan & Mary J. Blige, Chrisette Michele, Angie Stone, Erykah Badu, Amy Winehouse, India.Arie, Estelle, and South African star Lira among others.

2010 brought Avatar's release of the Final Season soundtrack to the Showtime television series The L Word. The soundtrack featured an all female lineup including Reni Lane, Costanza, Carla Tomas, Jaymes Bullett, Tilly and the Wall, Client, Sharleen Spiteri, Gabriella Cilmi, Jill Barber, Holly Palmet and others whose music had been featured in the last season of the show.

In response to the 2011 earthquake and tsunami in Japan, Avatar put together the Jazz For Japan charity CD. The album featured many of the top jazz musicians in the world including Ndugu Chancler, Nathan East, Tom Scott, Steve Gadd, Peter Erskine, George Duke, Rickey Minor, Billy Childs, Marcus Miller, Kenny G, Lee Ritenour, Alex Acuna, Christian McBride, Herman Jackson, Chuck Berghofer, and many others.

== Avatar Entertainment, Ltd. ==
Avatar Entertainment, Ltd. based in London England (also known as Avatar UK) is a separate but loosely affiliated company that releases music in the UK and throughout Europe. Avatar UK has signed or licensed artists and albums for release which may or may not have been released by Avatar Records in the United States. In 2006 Avatar UK released the album "Rebel Soul Music" by the former guitarist of The Roots, Martin Luther in Europe. Martin's first single "Daily Bread" was a hit single across Europe and Africa garnering airplay on BBC Radio 1 (UK), Radio Nova (France), MTV UK, MTV Bass (Europe), MTV Africa, and other radio and video channels. In September 2007 Martin starred in the film Across the Universe, a Sony Pictures release. Other artists released via this relationship include Anya Marina and Cazwell. Avatar UK also oversees day-to-day management of clients including Leeds based singer/songwriter Jack Haining, and Dutch directors Walker Pachler and Andres Fouche via AvatarMgmt.

== Artists ==
- Planet Asia
- One Block Radius
- Martin Luther
- Don "Magic" Juan
- Rosalia de Souza
- Deux Process
- Anya Marina
- Cazwell
- Cree Summer
- Jim Jones
- DJ Wildchild DCA
- Da Brat
- Kel Mitchell

== See also ==
- List of record labels
