= Felt 3: A Tribute to Rosie Perez =

Studio album by Felt
- Released: November 16, 2009
- Genre: Hip hop
- Length: 68:07
- Label: Rhymesayers Entertainment
- Producer: Aesop Rock

Felt chronology
Felt 2: A Tribute to Lisa Bonet (2005)	Felt 3: A Tribute to Rosie Perez (2009)	Felt 4 U (2020)

Felt 3: A Tribute to Rosie Perez is the third studio album by Felt, an American hip hop duo made up of Murs and Slug. It is a concept album meant as a tribute to actress Rosie Perez. Produced by Aesop Rock, it was released by Rhymesayers Entertainment in 2009. It peaked at number 131 on the Billboard 200 albums chart.

== Critical reception ==
Professional ratings
Aggregate scores
Source	Rating
Metacritic	79/100
Review scores
Source	Rating
AllMusic	4.5/5 stars
Robert Christgau	(1-star Honorable Mention)
Pitchfork	5.8/10
PopMatters	7/10 stars
URB	4/5 stars

At Metacritic, which assigns a weighted average score out of 100 to reviews from mainstream critics, the album received an average score of 79, based on 8 reviews, indicating "generally favorable reviews".

== Track listing ==
No.	Title	Length
1.	"Protagonists"	3:40
2.	"Felt Chewed Up"	3:42
3.	"Get Cake"	0:56
4.	"Bass for Your Truck"	3:15
5.	"Like You"	3:28
6.	"Permanent Standby"	3:56
7.	"Kevin Spacey"	1:11
8.	"Ghost Dance Deluxe"	4:00
9.	"Revisiting the Styleetron"	5:15
10.	"Whaleface"	2:53
11.	"Glory Burning"	4:14
12.	"Henrietta Longbottom"	3:35
13.	"She Sonnet"	3:43
14.	"Felt Good"	1:27
15.	"Deathmurdermayhem"	5:04
16.	"The Prize"	2:40
17.	"G.I. Josephine"	3:35
18.	"The Clap"	0:52
19.	"We Have You Surrounded"	3:35
20.	"Give It Up"	3:46
21.	"Paul Reubens"	3:30
Total length:		68:07

Bandcamp edition bonus tracks
No.	Title	Length
22.	"Bass for Your Trunk (Ant Remix)"	3:41
23.	"G.I. Josephine (The Grouch Remix)"	3:30
Total length:		75:18

10 year anniversary vinyl edition bonus disc: Slug disc
No.	Title	Length
1.	"Bass for Your Truck (Ant Remix)"	3:41

10 year anniversary vinyl edition bonus disc: Murs disc
No.	Title	Length
1.	"G.I. Josephine (The Grouch Remix)"	3:30

10 year anniversary vinyl edition bonus disc: Aesop Rock disc
No.	Title	Length
1.	"Protagonists (Full Clip Remix)" (featuring Blueprint, Scarub, and Cage)	3:23

== Personnel ==
Credits adapted from liner notes.

- Murs – vocals
- Slug – vocals
- Aesop Rock – production
- DJ Big Wiz – turntables
- Jeremy Fish – vocals (3)
- Jacob – vocals (9)
- Allyson Baker – bass guitar (11)
- Jessie – vocals (18)
- Joey Raia – mixing
- Chris Gehringer – mastering
- MK Larada – illustration, design
- Dan Monick – photography

== Charts ==
Chart	Peak position
US Billboard 200	131
US Independent Albums (Billboard)	14
US Top R&B/Hip-Hop Albums (Billboard)	19
