= The End of the Beginning (Murs album) =

Studio album by Murs
- Released: February 25, 2003
- Genre: Hip-hop
- Length: 69:47
- Label: Definitive Jux
- Producer: Tate the Example; Mr. Dibbs; Belief; Oh No; Jizzm High Definition; Patchwerk; Blockhead; Shock G; El-P; RJD2; Sunspot Jonz; Ant; Mum's the Word

Murs chronology
Murs Is My Best Friend (2001)	The End of the Beginning (2003)	Murs for President (2008)

Singles from The End of the Beginning
- 1. "God's Work" Released: 2002; 2. "Risky Business" Released: 2003

The End of the Beginning is a studio album by American rapper Murs. It was released on Definitive Jux in 2003.

== Critical reception ==
Professional ratings
Review scores
Source	Rating
AllMusic	4.5/5 stars
Blender	3/5 stars
HipHopDX	4.0/5
Pitchfork	7.7/10
Rolling Stone	3/5 stars
Stylus Magazine	B−
Tiny Mix Tapes	4/5
The Village Voice	A−

John Bush of AllMusic described The End of the Beginning as "one of the most refreshing rap records in years." Nathan Rabin of The A.V. Club called it a "stellar label debut".

In XLR8R, Philip Sherburne praised "Murs' lyricism, which combines an unhurried, conversational flow with a confidence so solid he needn't resort to boasting". Louis Miller of CMJ New Music Report said, "While delivering bold statements against wannabe gangstas and shaking his head at record industry politics, Murs manages to marry street-life thug-appeal with intelligent lyricism and spitfire delivery, attempting to bring The End to corporate Hip-Hop."

== Track listing ==
No.	Title	Producer(s)	Length
1.	"You & I"	Tate the Example	3:14
2.	"Dibbs Did This Shit"	Mr. Dibbs	2:09
3.	"What Do You Know?"	Belief	4:05
4.	"The Scuffle"	Oh No	3:44
5.	"The Night Before"	Jizzm High Definition	4:38
6.	"Transitionz az a Ridah"	Patchwerk	3:26
7.	"Happy Pillz" (featuring Aesop Rock)	Blockhead	4:56
8.	"Risky Business" (featuring Shock G)	Shock G	4:53
9.	"The Dance" (featuring El-P)	El-P	4:37
10.	"God's Work"	Belief	4:24
11.	"Def Cover"	El-P	3:56
12.	"Please Leave"	Oh No	3:46
13.	"Sore Losers"	RJD2	2:50
14.	"BT$"	Sunspot Jonz	3:07
15.	"18 w/ a Bullet"	Ant	4:27
16.	"Brotherly Love"	Belief	3:50
17.	"Got Damned?"	Ant	4:19
18.	"Done Deal" (featuring 3 Melancholy Gypsys)	Mum's the Word	3:29

== Charts ==
Chart (2003)	Peak position
US Independent Albums (Billboard)	27
