= Felts (disambiguation) =

Felt is a textile that is produced by matting, condensing, and pressing fibers together.

Felts may also refer to:

- Narvel Felts (born 1938), American country music singer
- Nollie Felts (1905–1974), American football player
- Baldwin–Felts Detective Agency, a U.S. private detective agency founded by William Gibboney Baldwin and Thomas Lafayette

== See also ==
- Felt (disambiguation)
