= Scapegoat Wax =

American hip hop group

- Origin: Chico, California
- Genres: Hip hop; breakbeat
- Years active: 1999-2002; 2021-present
- Labels: Grand Royal; Hollywood; Mighty Oak
- Past members: Marty James; Jonny Z

Scapegoat Wax is an American hip hop and breakbeat band from Chico, California that was started by Marty James and Jonny Z (AKA J.DeVille).

The band was best known for their single "Aisle 10 (Hello Allison)", which reached moderate success in the US and was part of the Xbox video game Jet Set Radio Future as well as being on the soundtrack for Project Gotham Racing. Other singles that achieved lesser success include "Almost Fine" and "Lost Cause". Their single "Space to Share" has been included on several motion picture soundtracks and television shows, such as Clockstoppers, America's Sweethearts and 40 Days and 40 Nights, the episode "Company Picnic: Part 2" of Malcolm in the Middle and the unaired pilot of Wonderfalls.

== History ==
Scapegoat Wax produced three albums during their active years: Luxurious (1999), Okeeblow (2001), and SWAX (2002). Many of the same songs appear on all three albums, with each adding refinements to existing songs and some original material. The band was associated with three different labels. They were originally part of Grand Royal Records, but when that label folded, they moved on to Hollywood Records before eventually splitting up not long after the release of SWAX, in favor of returning to their indie label roots. Jonny Z was in the band for a relatively brief time, but he was active in Scapegoat Wax's earliest tracks, primarily those on Luxurious, and was mentioned in each recorded version of the song "Almost Fine."

The live band featured Koool G Murder on bass who has also played for Everlast and now plays with Eels. The band supported the Fun Lovin' Criminals on a UK tour in the early 2000s.

Marty James and MDA became a part of a similar-sounding band called One Block Radius in 2003, and continue to produce music together.

In October 2021, it was announced that the first two singles from a new album, entitled Atomic Slam!, would be released on November 17, 2021. The next two singles, "Around Midnight" and "Kick Ya Feet Up", were released on February 16, 2022. The final single of the Atomic Slam! trilogy was released on March 29, 2022. The full album was released later that year on May 20, 2022, featuring 4 additional songs not featured in the Atomic Slam! trilogy. These songs were "Move On", "Farther", "C'mon C'mon", and "Theme From 90z Dad".

== Discography ==
=== Studio albums ===
- Luxurious (1999)
- Okeeblow (2001)
- SWAX (2002)
- Atomic Slam (2022)

=== Singles ===
- "Aisle 10 (Hello Allison)" (2001)
- "I'm a Bird" (2002)
- "Evaporate" (2022)
- "Reckless" (2022)
- "Around Midnight" (2022)
- "Kick Ya Feet Up" (2022)
- "Caving" (2022)
- "Bad Seed" (2022)

=== Compilation appearances ===
- 2002 - Jet Set Radio Future Music Sampler
  - Features the track "Aisle 10 (Hello Allison)"
