= Mario Biondi =

Italian singer

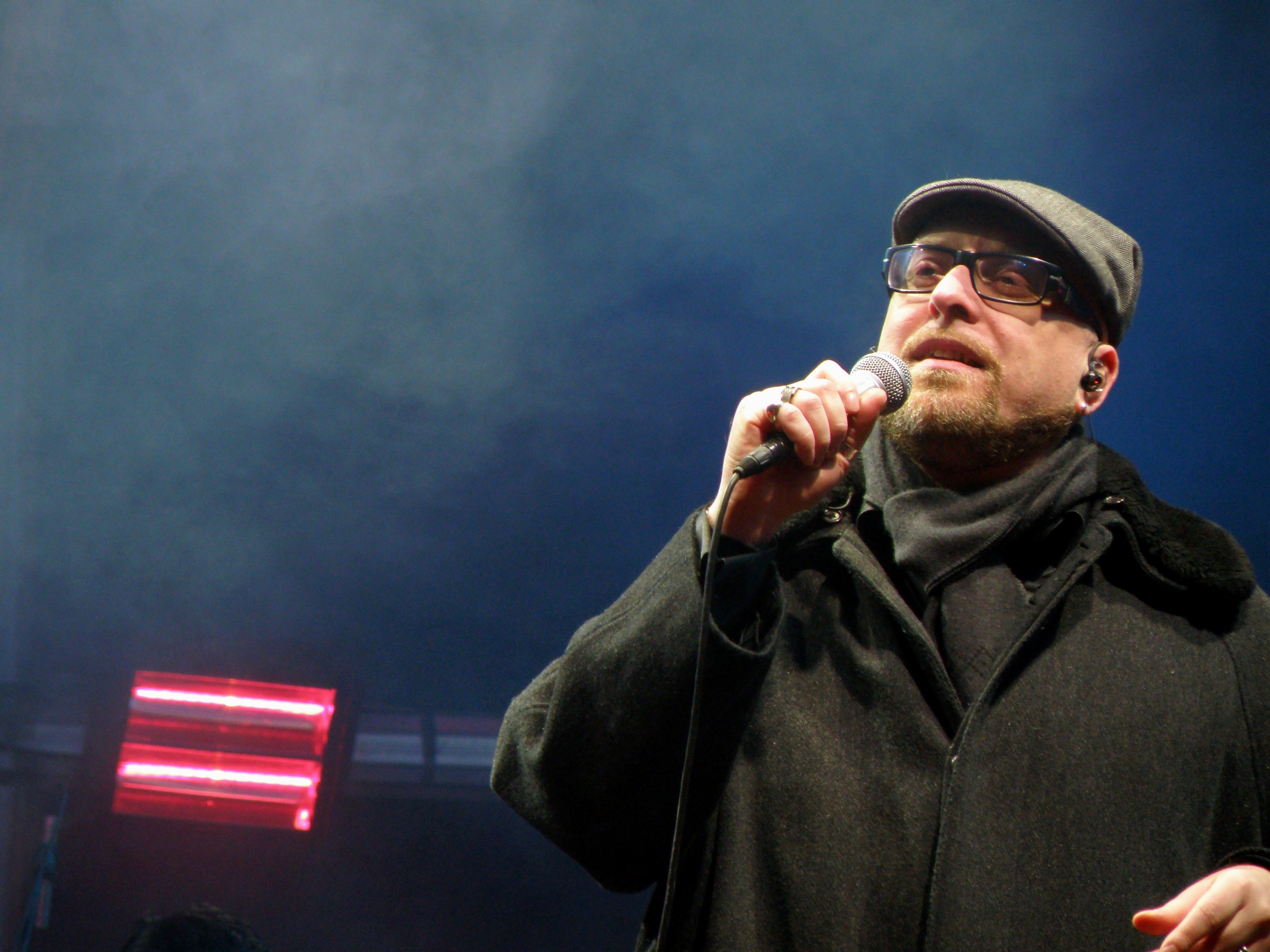

Background information
- Born: Mario Ranno; 28 January 1971 (age 55); Catania, Italy
- Genres: Soul; jazz; contemporary R&B
- Occupation: Musician
- Years active: 2006–present
- Website: www.mariobiondi.it

Mario Biondi (born Mario Ranno, 28 January 1971) is an Italian singer.

== Early life ==
Mario Biondi was born in Catania, Italy, to local Sicilian parents. He is the son of popular song singer Giuseppe Ranno, known by the pseudonym Stefano Biondi, and he chose his stage name accordingly. He sang in various small choirs during his youth. Biondi was passionate about soul and trained by listening to the records of Lou Rawls, Al Jarreau and Isaac Hayes among others, while important for his artistic growth, he declared, was the friendship with fellow citizen Gianni Bella. By 1988, he was a big supporter of Ray Charles.

Years after he accompanied Franco Califano, Peppino Di Capri, Fred Bongusto, Rosario Fiorello and others on their Concert tours.

== Career ==
After a long series of collaborations with Italian and international artists, as well a small production of disco music, he achieved success in 2006 with the Schema Records album Handful of Soul. His deep and warm voice recalls the great interpreters of soul and rhythm and blues music. In 2007, he released a double disc containing live material, entitled I Love You More LIVE. In 2010 he released a live album Yes You (Live) and followed that in 2011 with a double CD album Due. In 2013, Biondi released a new album SUN and Mario Christmas. On 5 May 2015 Mario has published a brand new record: Beyond, featuring songs such as "Love is a temple".

== Discography ==
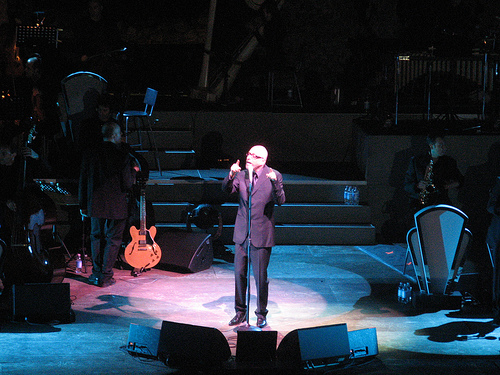
Mario Biondi and the High Five Quintet, in Taormina June 2007

=== Studio albums ===
- Handful of Soul (2006)
- If (2010)
- Due (2011)
- Sun (2013)
- Mario Christmas (2013)
- Beyond (2015)
- Best of Soul (2016)
- Brasil (2018)
- Dare (2021)
- Romantic (2022)
- Crooning Undercover (2023)

=== Live albums ===
- I Love You More (2007)
- Yes You (2010)
