= Luckyiam =

American rapper (born 1973)

- Also known as: Luckyiam.PSC
- Born: Tommy Woolfolk, Jr. August 2, 1973 (age 52)
- Origin: Los Angeles, California, US
- Genres: Underground hip hop
- Occupation: Rapper
- Years active: 1990–present
- Labels: Legendary Music, Luck & Lana Records
- Website: luckydoot.com

Tommy Woolfolk Jr., better known by his stage name Luckyiam, is a rapper from Los Angeles, California. He is a founding member of Living Legends. He is also a member of CMA and Mystik Journeymen.

== History ==
Luckyiam released Most Likely to Succeed in 2007.

In 2009, he released a collaborative album, One Uppers, with Sapient of Debaser as The Prime.

I Love Haters was released as a free download on Lifted Research Group's website in 2011. The album features guest appearances from Aceyalone and Slug.

He released Time to Get Lucky in 2012. He formed the duo Luck & Lana with vocalist Lana Shea. Luck & Lana have since released 2 albums together with production team Kill the Computer, under the name Luck & Lana Kill the Computer. Their first self-titled album was released in 2013. The follow-up, titled Go, was released in 2016 and has been critically acclaimed for both its lyricism and genre-bending beats.

== Discography ==
=== Albums ===
- Walkman Invaders (1995) (with Sunspot Jonz, as Mystik Journeymen)
- 4001: The Stolen Legacy (1995) (with Sunspot Jonz, as Mystik Journeymen)
- Children ov tha Night (1996) (with Sunspot Jonz, as Mystik Journeymen)
- Pressed 4 Time (1996) (with Sunspot Jonz, as Mystik Journeymen)
- Worldwide Underground (1998) (with Sunspot Jonz, as Mystik Journeymen)
- The Black Sands ov Eternia (1999) (with Sunspot Jonz, as Mystik Journeymen)
- Overall (1999) (with The Grouch, as CMA)
- Justify the Means (2002)
- Magic (2002) (with Sunspot Jonz, as Mystik Journeymen)
- Extra Credit (2002)
- Extra Credit 2 (2003)
- All Over (2005) (with The Grouch, as CMA)
- Most Likely to Succeed (2007)
- The Present (2009)
- One Uppers (2009) (with Sapient, as The Prime)
- Return 2 the Love (2010) (with Sunspot Jonz, as Mystik Journeymen)
- I Love Haters (2011)
- Time to Get Lucky (2012)
- Luck & Lana Kill the Computer (2013) (with Lana Shea and Kill the Computer, as Luck & Lana Kill the Computer)
- Go (2016) (with Lana Shea and Kill the Computer, as Luck & Lana Kill the Computer)

=== EPs ===
- Break That Fear (1998) (with Sunspot Jonz, as Mystik Journeymen)
- Mercury Rising (1999) (with Sunspot Jonz, as Mystik Journeymen)
- Malapas Tears (2002) (with Sunspot Jonz, as Mystik Journeymen)
- The Collectors Item (2003)

=== Singles ===
- "Escape Forever" (1996) (with Sunspot Jonz, as Mystik Journeymen)
- "The Best" (1999) (with The Grouch, as CMA)
- "Windows" b/w "Tactics" (2004) (with The Grouch, as CMA)
- "If I Do" b/w "Please Be Quiet (Shut Up!)" (2002)
- "Shut Up" b/w "Come Along" (2002)
- "Are We There Yet?" b/w "Good Side" (2004) (with The Grouch, as CMA)
- "Canustaycool?" b/w "Jane Is a Groupie" (2005) (with The Grouch, as CMA)
- "The Best I Can" b/w "Borrowed Time" (2008)

=== Guest appearances ===
- Murmurecordings - "Strike a Pose" from Poor Local Poetry (1998)
- Eligh - "Mingus and Me" and "A Gas Dreamers Farewell" from Gas Dream (2000)
- DJ Murge - “Student Ov Life” from Search and Rescue (2002)
- Omid - "Live from Tokyo" from Monolith (2003)
- Scarub - "Make Things Crack" from A New Perspective (2004)
- Subtitle - "Crew Cut (for Sale)" from Young Dangerous Heart (2005)
- Eligh - "Love ov My Life" from Grey Crow (2010)
- Grieves - "Identity Cards" from 88 Keys and Counting (2010)
- Isaiah Toothtaker - "Unheard Unseen" from Illuminati Thug Mafia (2011)
- Lush One - "Stella Artois" from Gold Bricks in the Wall (2011)
- Sole - "D.O.I. (Death of Industry)" from Nuclear Winter Volume 2: Death Panel (2011)
- Abstract Rude - "Kan of Whoop Ass Reprise" from Keep the Feel: A Legacy of Hip Hop Soul (2015)
- DJ Free Leonard - "Power To The People" from "Assimilate Or Eliminate" (2015)
- DJ Free Leonard - "Hip Hop Ain't The Same" from "Assimilate Or Eliminate" (2015)
- Broken Treaty Poet - "Take AIM" from "Birthright Tribal Member Soundtrack" (2017)
- DJ Free Leonard - "Wise Words Spoken" from "T.H.E.Y. EP" (2018)

== See also ==
- Living Legends
- Sunspot Jonz
