= SWAX =

Studio album by Scapegoat Wax
- Released: September 17, 2002
- Genre: Hip hop; R&B; breakbeat
- Label: Hollywood Records

Scapegoat Wax chronology
Okeeblow (2001)	SWAX (2002)

Professional ratings
Review scores
Source	Rating
Allmusic	link

SWAX is an album by American hip hop/breakbeat band Scapegoat Wax, released in 2002 by Hollywood Records.

== Track listing ==
1. "Back Alive"
2. "Watching the Rain"
3. "Lost Cause"
4. "Crawlin'"
5. "Freeway"
6. "Bloodsweet"
7. "Space to Share"
8. "Eardrum"
9. "Perfect Silence"
10. "Aisle 10 (Hello Allison)"
11. "Almost Fine"
12. "Both My Friends"
