= Rosalia de Souza =

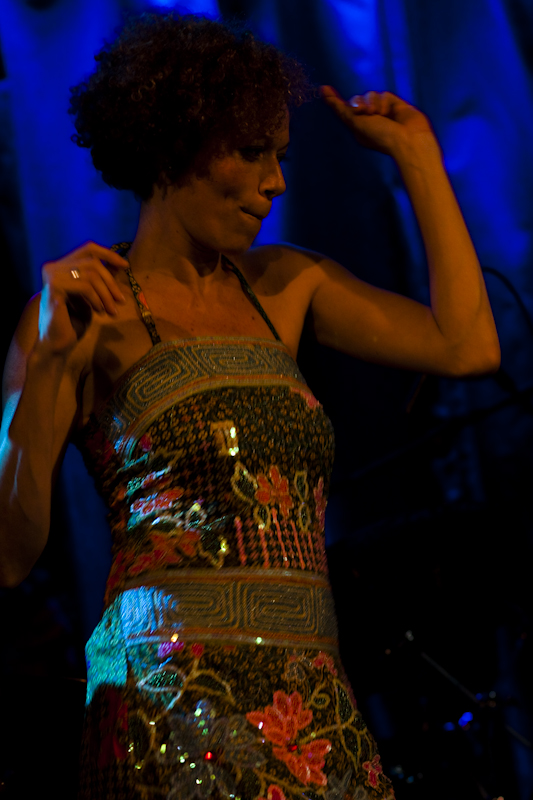
- de Souza in 2009

Background information
- Born: Rosalia de Souza; July 4, 1966 (age 60); Nilópolis, Rio de Janeiro, Brazil
- Genre: Bossa nova
- Occupation: Singer
- Instrument: Vocals
- Labels: Avatar, Schema, Phantom Sound & Vision

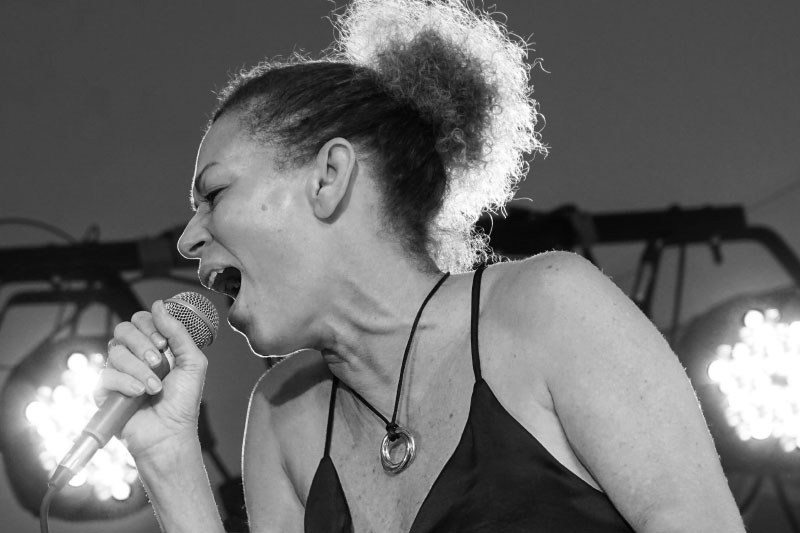
Rosalia de Souza (2020) in Aarhus, Denmark

Rosalia de Souza (born July 4, 1966) is a Brazilian bossa nova singer. She was born in Nilópolis, Rio de Janeiro, Brazil, an area famous for its samba school, Beija-Flor.

After travelling to Italy at the age of 21, she began to study music theory, Cuban percussion, and jazz at the Scuola Popolare di Testaccio (Popular school of Testaccio) in Rome.

== Discography ==
=== Albums ===
- Garota Moderna (2003)
- Garota Diferente (Schema, 2004)
- Brasil Precisa Balançar (Schema, 2008)
- D'Improvviso (Schema, 2009)
- Tempo (2018) (Nau Records -NAU1328)
- Inspirada (2022)

=== Singles & EPs ===
- Maria Moita (2002)
- Samba Novo / Bossa 31 (2004)
- Fica Mal Com Deus / Canto De Ossanha (2004)
- Zona Sul / Maria Moita (2004)
- Adriana / Saudosismo (2004)
- Jogo De Roda (2005)
- Que Bandeira (2006)
- Rio De Janeiro (2006)

=== Compilations ===
- Novo Esquema da Bossa (1995)
- Today’s Sound (1997)
- Hommage (2002)
