= Felt 2: A Tribute to Lisa Bonet =

Studio album by Felt
- Released: July 12, 2005
- Recorded: September – October 2004
- Genre: Hip hop
- Length: 53:19
- Label: Rhymesayers Entertainment
- Producer: Ant

Felt chronology
Felt: A Tribute to Christina Ricci (2002)	Felt 2: A Tribute to Lisa Bonet (2005)	Felt 3: A Tribute to Rosie Perez (2009)

Singles from Felt 2: A Tribute to Lisa Bonet
- 1. "Dirty Girl" Released: 2005

Professional ratings
Review scores
Source	Rating
HipHopDX	4.0/5
Pitchfork	7.7/10
PopMatters	6/10 stars
RapReviews.com	9/10
Stylus Magazine	B−

Felt 2: A Tribute to Lisa Bonet is the second studio album by Felt, an American hip hop duo made up of Murs and Slug. It is a concept album meant as a tribute to actress Lisa Bonet. Produced by Ant, it was released by Rhymesayers Entertainment in 2005. It peaked at number 12 on the Billboard Heatseekers Albums chart, as well as number 21 on the Independent Albums chart.

== Critical reception ==
Tom Breihan of Pitchfork gave the album a 7.7 out of 10, saying: "Other than a couple of throwaway skits where they talk condescendingly to girls on the phone, Felt 2 is pretty great."

== Track listing ==
No.	Title	Length
1.	"Reintroduction"	0:43
2.	"Employees of the Year"	3:20
3.	"Your Mans and Them"	3:28
4.	"Lisa (Never Easty on My Nextel)"	1:22
5.	"Morris Day"	3:50
6.	"Dirty Girl"	3:45
7.	"Early Mornin' Tony"	2:40
8.	"Breaker Down Like a Shotgun"	4:43
9.	"Marvin Gaye"	3:21
10.	"Life Vegas"	4:45
11.	"Bonet (Cement Angels)"	1:42
12.	"Woman Tonight"	3:54
13.	"Gangster Ass Anthony"	3:45
14.	"The Biggest Lie"	3:54
15.	"I Shot a Warhol"	3:54
16.	"20 Answers (Bonus Track - 10th Anniversary Edition)"	4:12

== Personnel ==
Credits adapted from liner notes.

- Murs – vocals
- Slug – vocals
- Ant – production
- Brett Johnson – bass guitar (3)
- Nate Collis – guitar (3, 6, 12, 15), vocals (14)
- Erick Anderson – keyboards (12, 15)
- Joe Mabott – engineering, mixing, mastering
- Ian Campbell – engineering assistance, mixing assistance
- Aaron Farley – layout, design
- Dan Monick – layout, design, photography

== Charts ==
Chart	Peak position
US Heatseekers Albums (Billboard)	12
US Independent Albums (Billboard)	21
