= Felt: A Tribute to Christina Ricci =

Studio album by Felt
- Released: November 11, 2002
- Genre: Hip-hop
- Length: 30:26
- Label: Rhymesayers Entertainment
- Producer: The Grouch

Felt chronology
Felt: A Tribute to Christina Ricci (2002)	Felt 2: A Tribute to Lisa Bonet (2005)

Professional ratings
Review scores
Source	Rating
HipHopSite.com	3.5/5 stars

Felt: A Tribute to Christina Ricci is the first studio album by Felt, an American hip-hop duo made up of Murs and Slug. It is a concept album about actress Christina Ricci. Produced by The Grouch, it was released by Rhymesayers Entertainment in 2002. It has sold over 50,000 copies.

== Track listing ==
No.	Title	Length
1.	"Christina Intro"	0:24
2.	"The Two"	3:57
3.	"Anneurysm"	4:59
4.	"Hot Bars"	4:38
5.	"Suzanne Vega"	3:48
6.	"Rick James"	3:11
7.	"Corey's Interlude"	0:46
8.	"Another Knight"	4:20
9.	"All I Can Do"	4:07
10.	"Ricci Outro"	0:21

== Personnel ==
Credits adapted from liner notes.

- Murs – vocals
- Slug – vocals
- The Grouch – production
- Mr. Dibbs – turntables
- Manproof – artwork
- Dan Monick – photography
