= Earthtones (Crown City Rockers album) =

Studio album by Crown City Rockers
- Released: August 24, 2004
- Genre: Hip-hop
- Length: 64:53
- Label: Basement Records
- Producer: Crown City Rockers, DJ Platurn, Headnodic, Kat Ouano, Pismo, Woodstock

Crown City Rockers chronology
| One (2001) | Earthtones (2004) | The Day After Forever (2009) |

Professional ratings
Review scores
| Source | Rating |
|---|---|
| AllHipHop | 4/5 |
| Exclaim! | favorable |
| Pitchfork | 7.7/10 |
| RapReviews.com | 7.5/10 |
| Urban Smarts | 65/100 |

Earthtones is a 2004 studio album by American hip-hop group Crown City Rockers.

== Track listing ==
| No. | Title | Length |
|---|---|---|
| 1. | "Intro" | 0:33 |
| 2. | "Another Day" | 3:30 |
| 3. | "Balance" (featuring Scarub) | 4:00 |
| 4. | "Sidestep" (featuring Destani Wolf) | 6:31 |
| 5. | "Interlude" | 1:28 |
| 6. | "B-Boy" | 4:04 |
| 7. | "Fortitude" (featuring Gift of Gab) | 3:17 |
| 8. | "Maxlude" | 0:37 |
| 9. | "Fate" | 5:04 |
| 10. | "Culture" | 2:28 |
| 11. | "D Minor Nine" | 5:44 |
| 12. | "Simple / Maxlude 2" | 4:14 |
| 13. | "Heat" | 3:15 |
| 14. | "Earthtones / 43rd & Telegraph Pt. 1" | 2:57 |
| 15. | "Without Love" (featuring Zion) | 3:38 |
| 16. | "Something Pt. 3 / 43rd & Telegraph Pt. 2" | 4:24 |
| 17. | "10:53" | 3:57 |
| 18. | "No Sense" | 2:52 |
| 19. | "Proteus" | 2:20 |
