= Felt (hip-hop group) =

American hip-hop group

- Origin: Minneapolis, Minnesota, U.S.
- Genre: Hip-hop
- Years active: 2002–present
- Label: Rhymesayers Entertainment
- Members: Slug; Murs
- Website: felt.bandcamp.com

Felt is an American hip-hop duo, consisting of Slug of Atmosphere and Murs of Living Legends.

== History ==
Slug and Murs first met at First Avenue in Minneapolis, Minnesota. Subsequently, the two started making music together and formed Felt.

Felt released the debut studio album, Felt: A Tribute to Christina Ricci, in 2002. It was produced by Murs' fellow Living Legends member The Grouch.

In 2005, the duo released the second studio album, Felt 2: A Tribute to Lisa Bonet. It was produced by Ant of Atmosphere.

In 2009, the duo released the third studio album, Felt 3: A Tribute to Rosie Perez. It was produced by Aesop Rock.

In 2020, Felt returned with a single, "Name in Ya Mouth". In that year, the duo released the fourth studio album, Felt 4 U. Produced by Ant, the album featured guest appearances from Blimes, Aesop Rock, The Grouch, and Shepard Albertson.

== Discography ==
=== Studio albums ===
- Felt: A Tribute to Christina Ricci (2002)
- Felt 2: A Tribute to Lisa Bonet (2005)
- Felt 3: A Tribute to Rosie Perez (2009)
- Felt 4 U (2020)

=== Singles ===
- "Dirty Girl" (2005)
- "Name in Ya Mouth" (2020)
- "Heavy D" (2021)
