= June Felter =

American painter and illustrator (1919–2019)

- Born: October 19, 1919; Oakland, California
- Died: July 13, 2019 (aged 99); Oakland, California
- Known for: Painting
- Spouse: Richard Henry Felter

June Felter (19 October 1919, Oakland, California – 13 July 2019), was an American painter and illustrator from the Bay Area. Her paintings are in museum collections including San Francisco Museum of Modern Art (SFMOMA), the Oakland Museum of California, Fine Arts Museum of San Francisco, National Gallery of Art, and the Berkeley Art Museum.

== Life ==
Felter was born on October 19, 1919, in Oakland, California. Her parents died when she was very young, and she grew up in the Tom and Grace Scanlon family. June studied at the Oakland Art Institute, the California College of Arts and Crafts, and the San Francisco Art Institute. In 1943 she married Richard Henry Felter and had two children, Susan and Tom. The couple stayed together until Richard’s death in 2000.

Felter was a commercial illustrator before and during World War II, and she transitioned to painting in the 1950s. At that time she studied with Richard Diebenkorn, and became a colleague of Elmer Bischoff and Wayne Thiebaud. She taught art to children and figurative drawing to adults at SFMOMA. Felter’s home and studio with hundreds of paintings and drawings was destroyed by the 1991 Oakland Firestorm. She died at home on 13 July 2019 at the age of 99.

== Art ==
Felter was influenced by artists of the Bay Area figurative movement, especially Richard Diebenkorn, Elmer Bischoff, and David Park. Her paintings and prints represent her everyday life; figures and still-lifes are the subject matter. A class at the San Francisco Art Institute taught by Richard Diebenkorn in 1960 furthered Felter’s practice of figurative style. In her landscapes, nudes and complex still-lifes, June’s work was appreciated for its graceful spontaneity.

In 1997 she became a part of Crown Point’s published "Live Model Group" portfolio which included work by Nathan Oliveira, Enrique Chagoya, and Fred Dalkey. Felter remarked that drawing a nude model not only shows an interest in ourselves as human beings, but also seems to be a necessary exercise for keeping flexible, sensitive, and open to surprise. She participated in etching workshops held in Kathan Brown's basement and her etchings are featured in his book "Why Draw a Live Model?"

Felter created a series of paintings on the Oakland hills fire of 1991. She painted her impression as a witness of the disastrous 1991 fire in the Oakland Hills using the expressive quality of gestural brushwork, she conveyed the dramatic effects of wind, fire and some in a vivid depiction of the catastrophic event.

Felter collaborated with Barbara Guest whose books Musicality (1988) and The Confetti Trees (1999) feature Felter’s art. Felter’s drawings also illustrate The Middle Ages poem by Rella Lossy in her book Time Pieces: A Collection of Poetry, 1944-1996. Felter’s artworks are also included in a booklet of Wiegand Gallery Art of June Felter, Adelie Landis, Louise Smith, 1992.

June Felter’s work has been offered at auction multiple times. Her latest exhibition featuring works spanning 60 years of a life in art "June Felter: Her Life & Art" was presented at 871 Fine Arts from October 2 to October 19, 2019.

== Exhibitions and shows ==
=== Solo shows ===
- Linda Farris Gallery, Seattle
- Lloyd Clark Gallery, Oakland
- 871 Fine Arts, San Francisco
- Richmond Art Center, Richmond, California

=== Group exhibitions ===
- The International Women’s Art Exhibit, Denmark
- The California Society of Printmakers, Museum of Tokyo, Japan
