= Okeeblow =

Studio album by Scapegoat Wax
- Released: June 19, 2001
- Genre: Hip hop; breakbeat
- Label: Grand Royal

Scapegoat Wax chronology
Luxurious (1999)	Okeeblow (2001)	SWAX (2002)

Professional ratings
Review scores
Source	Rating
AllMusic	2/5 stars

Okeeblow is an album by Scapegoat Wax, released in 2001.

== Track listing ==
1. "Star 6" - 3:08
2. "Aisle 10 (Hello Allison)" - 3:43
3. "Chico Boy" - 0:15
4. "Freeway" - 4:05
5. "Crawling" - 4:00
6. "Eardrum" (feat. The Suspects) - 3:57
7. "Space to Share" - 4:04
8. "For All We Have" - 1:12
9. "Light of the Moon" - 4:14
10. "Evelyn" - 4:24
11. "Perfect Silence" - 3:59
12. "Party of One" - 1:33
13. "Almost Fine" - 3:44
14. "OKEEBLOW" - 0:33
15. "Revenge of the Dope Fiend Beat" - 3:22
