= Reine Feldt =

Swedish footballer and journalist

Personal information
- Date of birth: 1945
- Date of death: 1986 (aged 40–41)
- Position: Defender

Youth career
- Utsiktens BK

Senior career*
Years	Team	Apps	(Gls)
- Utsiktens BK
1965–1975	IFK Göteborg	214	(1)
- * Club domestic league appearances and goals

Reine Feldt (1945–1986) was a Swedish footballer and journalist that played football for Utsiktens BK and IFK Göteborg.

== Career ==
Felt started his senior career in Utsiktens BK and joined IFK Göteborg in 1965. He made a total of 355 senior appearances for IFK Göteborg and was the captain of the Allsvenskan winning team of 1969.

He ended his career in 1975.

== Personal life ==
Feldt also worked as a journalist at Arbetet.

Feldt was secretly homosexual and died of AIDS in 1986 as one of the first victims in Sweden.

== Honours ==
=== Club ===
IFK Göteborg

- Allsvenskan (1): 1969

Individual

- Årets ärkeängel: 1973
