= Scarub =

American rapper

- Born: Armon Collins
- Origin: Los Angeles, California, U.S.
- Genre: Hip-hop
- Occupations: Rapper; record producer
- Years active: 1997–present
- Labels: Heavenbound; Legendary Music; Mary Joy Recordings
- Website: www.facebook.com/scarub

Armon Collins, better known by his stage name Scarub, is an American rapper and record producer from Los Angeles, California. He is a member of the collective Living Legends. He has also been a member of Log Cabin, 3 Melancholy Gypsys, and Afro Classics.

== Biography ==
Scarub was born Armon Collins. He grew up in Los Angeles, California. He attended Alexander Hamilton High School.

Scarub's first solo studio album, The Answer 2wo the Meaning, was released in 1997. He released A Fact of the Matter in 1999, Heavenbound in 2000, A New Perspective in 2004, and One for the Road: Volume One in 2006. In 2011, he released The California EP. In 2014, he released Want for Nothing, which featured guest appearances from Mimi Fresh, Emily Afton Moldy, and Anderson .Paak, among others.

== Discography ==
=== Studio albums ===
- The Answer 2wo the Meaning (1997)
- Project (1999) (with Basik, Eligh, and Murs, as The Righteous Brothers)
- A Fact of the Matter (1999)
- Heavenbound (2000) — guest producers include Style MiSia, Eligh, OD, The Grouch, Belief, and Thes One
- Afro Classics? (2002) (with Very, as Afro Classics)
- A New Perspective (2004)
- One for the Road: Volume One (2006)
- Classic Rock (2009) (with Very, as Afro Classics)
- Want for Nothing (2014)
- Girls Girls Girls (2019)

=== EPs ===
- The Classic EP (2009) (with Very, as Afro Classics)
- The California EP (2011)

=== Singles ===
- "Savvy Traveler" (1999)
- "Good Times" (2001)
- "Don't Worry" (2002) (with Very)
- "Gangsta Wit It" (2005)
- "Keep On Stepping" (2006)

=== Guest appearances ===
- Eligh - "8Tred" from A Story of 2 Worlds (1997)
- Eligh - "Lifesize Puzzle" from Gas Dream (1999)
- Sunspot Jonz - "Unstoppable" from Don't Let 'Em Stop You (2003)
- The Grouch & Eligh - "Atlantis" from No More Greener Grasses (2003)
- Crown City Rockers - "Balance" from Earthtones (2004)
- Sunspot Jonz - "The Conductor" from No Guts No Glory (2005)
- The Grouch - "Hot Air Balloons" from Show You the World (2008)
- Acid Reign - "Comfort Zone" from Time & Change (2008)
- Felt - "Protagonists (Full Clip Remix)" (2009)
- Toki Wright - "Rise" from A Different Mirror (2009)
- Mystik Journeymen - "There Will Be Blood" from Return 2 the Love (2010)
- Eligh - "Beneath the Sea" from Grey Crow (2010)
- Inspired Flight - "It's the Chemicals" from We All Want to Fly (2010)
- Himself - "Do What You Feel" from Feel Like a Star (2011)
- Luckyiam - "Prolly Get Slapped" from Time to Get Lucky (2012)
- Souls of Mischief - "Stone Cold" from There Is Only Now (2014)
- Ghostface Killah and Adrian Younge - "Rise Up" and "Death's Invitation" from Twelve Reasons to Die II (2015)
- The Funk Junkie - "Touch the Ground" from Moondirt (2017)
- The Grouch - "The Drummer" from Unlock the Box (2018)
