= Eligh =

American rapper (born 1978)

- Also known as: Gandalf & Grey Crow
- Born: Eli Nathan Nachowitz; February 28, 1978 (age 48); Los Angeles, California, U.S.
- Genres: Alternative hip-hop, underground hip-hop
- Occupations: Rapper, producer
- Years active: 1991–present
- Label: Legendary Music
- Website: elighmusic.com

Eli Nathan Nachowitz (born February 28, 1978), better known as Eligh, is an American rapper and producer from Los Angeles. He is a member of the underground hip-hop group Living Legends.

== Biography ==
Eligh's inspiration for making hip-hop music came in the mid 1980s from the film Beat Street and LL Cool J's "I'm Bad." In high school, he co-founded the hip-hop duo Boogalu Badboys with Scarub. When they crossed paths with another rapper Murs, the three formed 3 Melancholy Gypsys (3MG). Eligh then moved from Los Angeles up north to the Bay Area, where he met The Grouch, which ultimately led to 3MG's incorporation into Living Legends.

In the mid and late 1990s, while simultaneously continuing to produce with Living Legends, Eligh released several self-pressed solo albums, such as As They Pass and Gas Dream. In the early 2000s, he released darker and more cryptic albums such as Poltergeist and Enigma.

In 2005, Eligh took a break from music to confront his growing drug and alcohol addiction problems. After heroin usage nearly took his life, Eligh attempted to get clean on his own, but eventually realized that he needed to seek out help. On October 12, 2005, Eligh checked himself into a treatment center, and has been free from all drugs and alcohol ever since. The Grammy foundation MusiCares, helped Eligh get a bed at an addiction treatment center and assisted with the related costs. Eligh also credits Alcoholics Anonymous and Narcotics Anonymous with helping him remain clean.

Much of the music that Eligh has released post-2005 has been influenced by his recovery and sobriety, and he has frequently tried to use his experiences to positively influence others. His album Grey Crow was released in 2010. It is his seventh solo album, and has been Eligh's best-selling album as an independent artist. Many of the songs on Grey Crow reflect on his struggles and new perspective on life, and the album has spawned many likes by underground hip-hop fans, who praise Eligh's unique flow and lyricism.

Eligh also released On Sacred Ground, a collaborative album with his mother, Jo Wilkinson, in 2009. In 2011, Eligh collaborated with producer Amp Live of Zion I to create the album Therapy at 3.

Combining his dogged work ethic with Living Legends' DIY approach, Eligh has released over a dozen albums, and contributed on many more. Sometimes under the alias Gandalf, he has provided beats for rappers outside Living Legends crew, including Company Flow, Pigeon John, John Cena and Freestyle Fellowship. Eligh has been involved in a number of Living Legends offshoots as well, including Log Cabin, The Righteous Brothers, and The Grouch & Eligh.

== Discography ==
=== Solo ===
- As They Pass (1996)
- Four Tracks: LA and Back (1997)
- A Story of 2 Worlds (1997)
- Sidewaydaze (1998)
- Coincidence (1999)
- Nightlife (1999)
- Chronik (1999)
- Gas Dream (2000)
- Gandalf's Beat Machine (2000)
- Gandalf's Beat Machine Level 2 (2002)
- Poltergeist (2003)
- Enigma (2005)
- Gandalf's Beat Machine Level 3 (2009)
- On Sacred Ground (2009)
- Grey Crow (2010)
- Therapy at 3 (2011)
- Nomads (2014) (disc 3 of The Tortoise and the Crow)
- 80 HRTZ (2015)
- Last House on the Block (2018)
- Inspire Nostalgia (2022)
- The Way the Light Looks (2026)

=== The Grouch & Eligh ===
- G&E Music Vol. 1 & 2 (2000)
- No More Greener Grasses (2003)
- Say G&E! (2009)
- 333 (2014) (disc 1 of The Tortoise and the Crow)
- The WinterFire EP (2014) (with CunninLynguists)
- What Would Love Do (2021)

=== 3 Melancholy Gypsys ===
- The Penguins (1998)
- Gypsy's Luck (1998)
- Live in Tokyo (2000)
- Grand Caravan to the Rim of the World (2005)

=== Living Legends ===
- UHB I (1996)
- UHB II (1996)
- UHB III: Against All Odds (1997)
- UHB IV: Stop & Retaliate (1999)
- Foxhole EP (1999)
- The Underworld (2000)
- Angelz Wit Dirty Faces (2000)
- Almost Famous (2001)
- UHB V: Legacy 2099 (2002)
- Crappy Old Shit (2003)
- The Four Track Avengers (2004)
- Creative Differences (2004)
- Classic (2005)
- Legendary Music (Volume 1) (2006)
- The Gathering (2008)
- Legendary Music (Volume 2) (2008)
- The Return (2023)
- Legendary Music (Volume 3) (2025)

=== Collaborations ===
- LA Experimental (1995) (as Log Cabin)
- Project (1999) (as The Righteous Brothers)
- On Sacred Ground (2009) (with Jo Wilkinson)
- The Brother's Grime (2007) (with Magi)
- Beat Battle (2008) (with DJ Fresh)
- Therapy at 3 (2011) (with AmpLive)
- Therapy at 3 (Remixes) (2012) (with AmpLive)
- So Bright (2013) (with Pretty Lights)
- Grand Tapestry (2016) (as Grand Tapestry)
- Evidence (2019)
- The Tonite Show with Eligh (2022) (with DJ Fresh)
- The Tonite Show (Instrumentals) with Eligh (2022) (with DJ Fresh)
- Halo Boy (2023) (with Aloeight)
- Hello Youth (2024) (with EC.SE)

=== Productions ===
- John Cena and Tha Trademarc – "Don't Fuck with Us" from You Can't See Me (2005)
- Zion I & The Grouch – "Lift Me Up" from Heroes in the City of Dope (2006)
- Isaiah Toothtaker – "Fuck 2009" from Yiggy (2010)
- Freestyle Fellowship – "We Are" from The Promise (2011)
- DJ Free Leonard – "Medicine Man" from Electrify The Masses EP (2017)
- DJ Free Leonard & Umar Bin Hassan of The Last Poets – "To Become Human" from 12" Single (2020)

=== Guest appearances ===
- Scarub and Very – "Public Relations" from Afro Classics? (2002)
- DJ Murge - "What It Used to Be" from Search and Rescue (2002)
- DJ Drez - "Hallways and Doors" from The Capture of Sound (2003)
- Murs – "Done Deal" from The End of the Beginning (2003)
- Pigeon John – "Sleeping Giants" from Sings the Blues (2005)
- The Gigantics – "The Explanation" from Die Already (2008)
- Mystik Journeymen – "Valley of the Dolls" from Return 2 the Love (2010)
- Onry Ozzborn – "No Time to Waste" from Duo (2016)
