= The Grouch (rapper) =

American rapper (born 1975)

- Born: Corey Scoffern; May 20, 1975 (age 51); Oakland, California, U.S.
- Genres: Alternative hip-hop; underground hip-hop
- Occupations: Rapper; record producer
- Years active: 1994–present
- Labels: Legendary Music; Outhouse
- Member of: The CMA; Living Legends; Thees Handz
- Website: therealgrouch.com

Corey Scoffern (born May 20, 1975), better known by his stage name the Grouch, is an American rapper and producer. He is currently based in Los Angeles, but was born and raised in Oakland, California. He is a founding member of Living Legends, an independent rap group from Los Angeles.

== Life and career ==
The Grouch was born and raised in Oakland, California, where he attended Skyline High School.

He produced the entirety of Felt's debut album, Felt: A Tribute to Christina Ricci, in 2002.

He collaborated with Eligh, Evidence and Zion I on the song "Amp Live for President" in 2011.

== Discography ==
=== Studio albums ===
- Don't Talk To Me (1995)
- Nothing Changes (1996)
- Success Is Destiny (1997)
- Fuck The Dumb (1998)
- Overall (1999) (with Luckyiam, as the CMA)
- Making Perfect Sense (1999)
- G&E Music Volume 1 & 2 (2000) (with Eligh)
- They Don't Have This (2000)
- Almost Famous (2001) (as Living Legends)
- Crusader For Justice (2003)
- No More Greener Grasses (2003) (with Eligh)
- Creative Differences (2004) (as Living Legends)
- All Over (2004) (with Luckyiam, as the CMA)
- Classic (2005) (as Living Legends)
- Heroes in the City of Dope (2006) (with Zion I)
- Legendary Music (as Living Legends) (2006)
- Show You the World (2008)
- Legendary Music (Volume 2) (as Living Legends) (2008)
- The Gathering (2008) (as Living Legends)
- Three Eyes Off The Time (2009) (with DJ.Fresh)
- Say G&E! (2009) (with Eligh)
- Heroes in the Healing of the Nation (2011) (with Zion I)
- The Tortoise And The Crow (2014) (with Eligh)
- Unlock The Box (2018)
- The Tonite Show With The Grouch (2018) (with DJ.Fresh)
- Thees Handz (2019) (with Murs, as Thees Handz)
- What Would Love Do (2021) (with Eligh)
- Threes Company (2022) (with Murs & Reverie, as Thees Handz)
- The Return (2023) (as Living Legends)
- Legendary Music (Volume 3) (as Living Legends) (2025)
- The 50 Year Old Rapper (2025)
- The Payoff (2026) (with Pure Powers, as The Linkz)

=== Compilation albums ===
- My Baddest Bitches (2005)
- Simple Man: Beans And Rice Sampler '07 (2007)

=== EPs ===
- G&E Music (Volume 1) (1998) (with Eligh)
- G&E Music (Volume 2) (2000) (with Eligh)
- Sound Advice (2004) (with Daddy Kev & D-Styles)
- The Winterfire EP (2014) (with Eligh & CunninLynguists)

=== Singles ===
- "You're Not The 1" (1998)
- "Simple Man" (1999)
- "Wish You a Good Day" (2000)
- "The Clap" (2003) (with Eligh)
- "No More Greener Grass" (2004) (with Eligh)
- "Windows" (2004) (with Luckyiam, as CMA)
- "Hit 'Em" (2006) (with Zion I)
- "Lift Me Up" (2007) (with Zion I)
- "Artsy" (2008)
- "All In" (2009) (with Eligh)
- "Fish Fly" (2016) (with Kelli Love)
- "I Love California Like You" (2016) (with Zion I and Eligh)
- "Unconditional" (2018) (with Rio Amor)
- "Devoted" (2018) (with DJ.Fresh)

=== DVDs ===
- Servin' Justice, directed by Peter D'Angelo Neil (2003)

=== Guest appearances ===
- Mystik Journeymen - "Billie & Me" from Walkman Invaders (1995)
- Murs - "Speed Bumps" from Comurshul (1996)
- Eligh - "The Dragon" from As They Pass (1996)
- Eligh - "Doghouse Bar" from A Story of 2 Worlds (1997)
- Murs - "Say Anything" from F'Real (1997)
- Scarub - "Love vs. Hate" from A Fact of the Matter (1999)
- Murs - "Angels" from Good Music (1999)
- Zion I - "Silly Puddy" from Mind over Matter (2000)
- Sunspot Jonz - "Loose Cannon" from Dirty Faces (2001)
- Zion I - "Flow" from Deep Water Slang V2.0 (2002)
- Mystik Journeymen - "Sweat" and "Mmmmmm" from Magic (2002)
- Luckyiam - "Unsatisfied" from Justify the Means (2002)
- DJ Murge - “Silhouettes” from Search and Rescue (2002)
- DJ Drez - "Hallways & Doors" from The Capture of Sound (2003)
- Sunspot Jonz - "Unstoppable" from Don't Let Em Stop You (2003)
- Scarub - "You Know" from A New Perspective (2004)
- Fat Jack - "Without Love" from Cater to the DJ 2 (2004)
- Pigeon John - "Sleeping Giants" from Sings the Blues (2005)
- Edit - "Artsy Remix" and "Back Up Off the Floor Pt. 2" from Certified Air Raid Material (2008)
- Sunspot Jonz - "Ride the Rhythm" from Never Surrender (2008)
- BK-One with Benzilla - "Here I Am" from Rádio Do Canibal (2009)
- Bicasso & DJ.Fresh - "The Town" from Rebel Musiq (2009)
- Eligh & Jo Wilkinson - "By and By" from On Sacred Ground (2009)
- Eligh - "Shine" from Grey Crow (2010)
- Amp Live - "Hot Right Now" from Murder at the Discotech (2010)
- Mystik Journeymen - "The Doorman Song" from Return 2 the Love (2010)
- Eligh & Amp Live - "Destination Unknown" from Therapy at 3 (2011)
- Opio & Equipto - "Sumday" from Red X Tapes (2011)
- Lateef the Truthspeaker - "Oakland" from Firewire (2011)
- Headnodic - "Turn Your Radio Up" from Red Line Radio (2011)
- Bill Ortiz - "Winter in America" from Winter in America (2012)
- Casual & DJ.Fresh - "Mama" from He Still Think He Raw (2012)
- Luckyiam - "Change This" from Time to Get Lucky (2012)
- Zion I - "We Don't" from Shadowboxing (2012)
- Qwel & Maker - "Pilfer" from Beautiful Raw (2013)
- Amp Live - "Last Wall" from Headphone Concerto (2014)
- Mr. Brady - "Time" from Timing Is Everything (2014)
- Abstract Rude - "Kan of Whoop Ass Reprise" from Keep the Feel: A Legacy of Hip Hop Soul (2015)
- Atmosphere - "Fishing Blues" from Fishing Blues (2016)
- DJ Free Leonard - "Wise Words Spoken" from T.H.E.Y. EP (2018)
- Felt - "Hologram" from Felt 4 U (2020)
- Unified Highway - "The Curse" from Invisible Route (2024)
- Cannibal Ox - "Wisdom Eons Ago" from Aireplane (2025)

=== Productions ===
- Felt - Felt: A Tribute to Christina Ricci (2002)
