= Living Legends (group) =

American hip-hop group

- Origin: Los Angeles, California, U.S.
- Genre: Hip-hop
- Years active: 1996–present
- Label: Legendary Music
- Members: Bicasso; Eligh; Luckyiam; Scarub; Sunspot Jonz; The Grouch
- Past members: Arata; Murs; Aesop The Black Wolf
- Website: legendarymusic.net

Living Legends is an American hip-hop supergroup consisting of indie hip-hop artists from California. Beginning in the mid 1990s, the crew garnered a following by recording, promoting and performing their music independently through Legendary Music.

The crew is considered by LA Weekly to be "one of the biggest success stories of the indie-rap movement, having sold millions of units collectively — all by them-damn-selves."

== History ==
Living Legends originally grew out of Mystik Journeymen, consisted of BFAP (now known as Sunspot Jonz) and PSC (now known as Lucky3). Beginning in 1994, the Mystik Journeymen began cultivating a fan base by selling their own tapes on the streets and hosting "Underground Survivors" shows in East Oakland. In 1995, the duo met The Grouch. They soon embarked on the first of several of self-funded tours throughout Europe. In 1996, Mystik Journeymen and The Grouch joined with the trio known as 3 Melancholy Gypsys (Eligh, Scarub, and Murs) of Los Angeles. They formed Living Legends in late 1990s. The crew has since grown to include Bicaso, Aesop and Arata.

The group and its members have founded and operated several imprints, including Outhouse Records, Dirt Works, Simple Man Records, and Revenge Entertainment. In 1999, Living Legends moved their base of operations to Los Angeles.

In May 2012, Murs quit the group. In June that year, The Grouch announced hiatus from the group.

In 2016, the group (Aesop, Bicasso, Eligh, Luckyiam, Murs, Scarub, Sunspot Jonz, and The Grouch) officially reunited for a regional tour and hit the road as part of the 10th annual How The Grouch Stole Christmas Tour.

Aesop The Black Wolf died in August 2025.

== Members ==
Current

- Bicasso - vocals, production
- Eligh - vocals, production
- Luckyiam - vocals
- Scarub - vocals, production
- Sunspot Jonz - vocals, production
- The Grouch - vocals, production

Former

- Arata - vocals
- Murs - vocals
- Aesop The Black Wolf - vocals (d. 2025)

== Discography ==
=== Studio albums ===
- Almost Famous (2001)
- Creative Differences (2004)
- Classic (2005)
- The Return (2023)

=== Compilation albums ===
- UBH Vol. 2 (1996)
- UBH Vol. 3: Against All Odds (1997)
- UBH 4: Stop & Retaliate (1999)
- The Underworld (2000)
- Angelz Wit Dirty Faces (2001)
- UBH V - Legacy 2099 (2002)
- Crappy Old Sh*t (2003)
- Legendary Music Volume 1 (2006)
- Legendary Music Volume 2 (2008)
- Legendary Music Volume 3 (2025)

=== EPs ===
- The Gathering (2008)

=== Singles ===
- "Gotta Question for Ya / Night Prowler / Forces of Nature" (2001)
- "Awakening / Fill My Drink Up" (2004)
- "Damn It Feels Good / Whatizit?" (2004)
- "Blast Your Radio" (2004)
- "Down for Nothin' / Brand New" (2005)
- "Never Fallin' / Good Fun" (2005)
- "She Wants Me" (2008)
- "Trojan Horse" (2012)
- "Legendaries" (2021)
- "LLXL" featuring Eli-Mac (2022)
- "Everyday" (2023)
- "Lettermen" from The Return (2023)
- "The Return" from The Return (2023)

=== DVDs ===
- Street Legendz (2004)
- Broke Ass Summer Jam (2007)
