= Sunspot Jonz =

American rapper

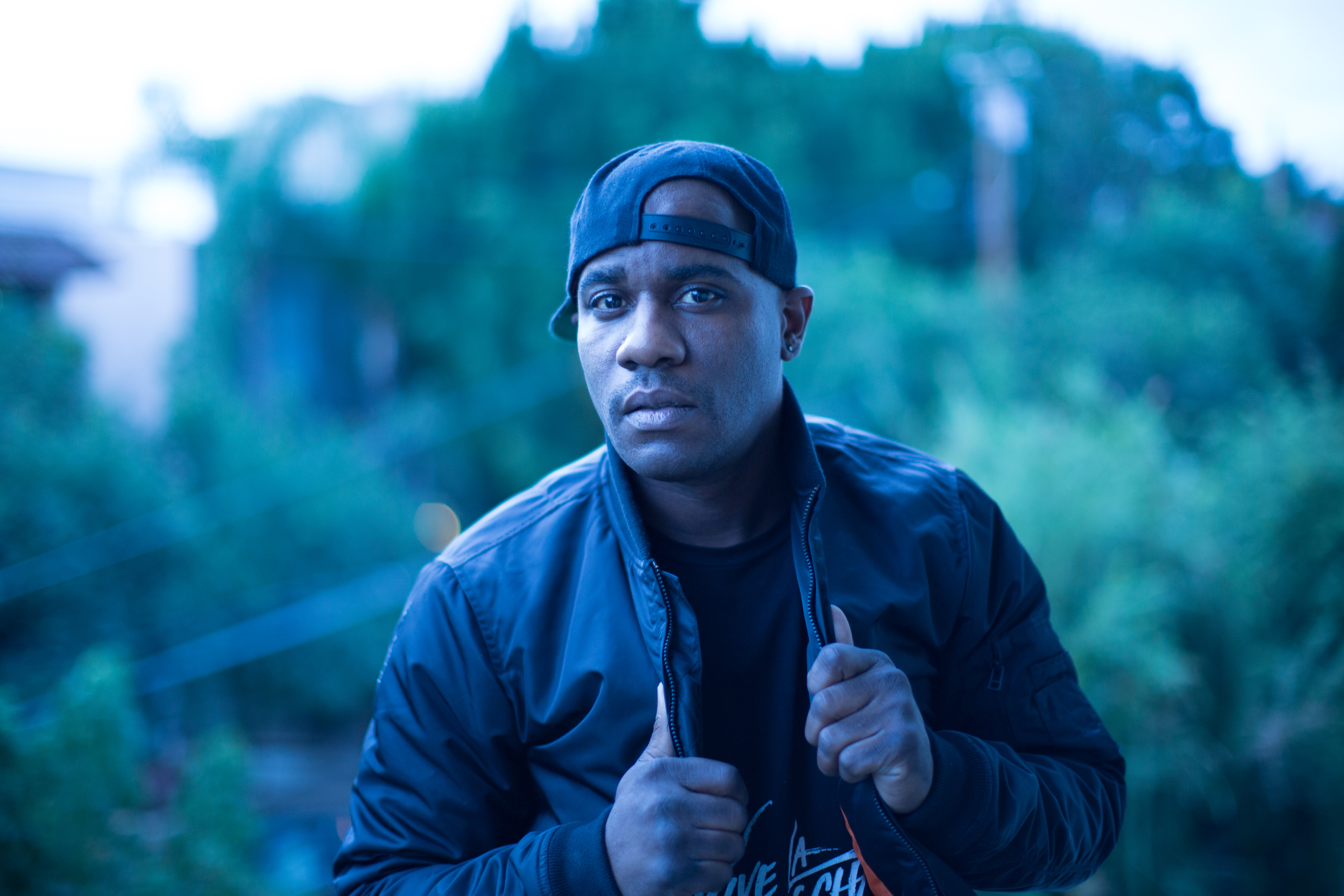
- Jonz in 2022

Background information
- Also known as: BFAP, Dusty Black, Vision
- Born: Corey Johnson; September 16; California
- Origin: Oakland, California
- Genre: Underground hip-hop
- Occupations: Rapper, producer
- Years active: 1994–present
- Labels: Outhouse; LL Crew; Revenge Entertainment; Legendary Music; Battle Axe Records; HBD; Universal International; Suniverze Records; Dream Academy
- Member of: Living Legends
- Website: suniverze.com hiphopscholastics.org

Corey Johnson (born September 16 in California), known professionally as Sunspot Jonz, is an American hip-hop artist, producer, writer, filmmaker, children's author, and community activist from Oakland, California. He is a founding member of the underground hip-hop collective Living Legends and has built a multidisciplinary career spanning independent music, film, literature, youth education, and community-based arts and cultural work.

== Early life and education ==
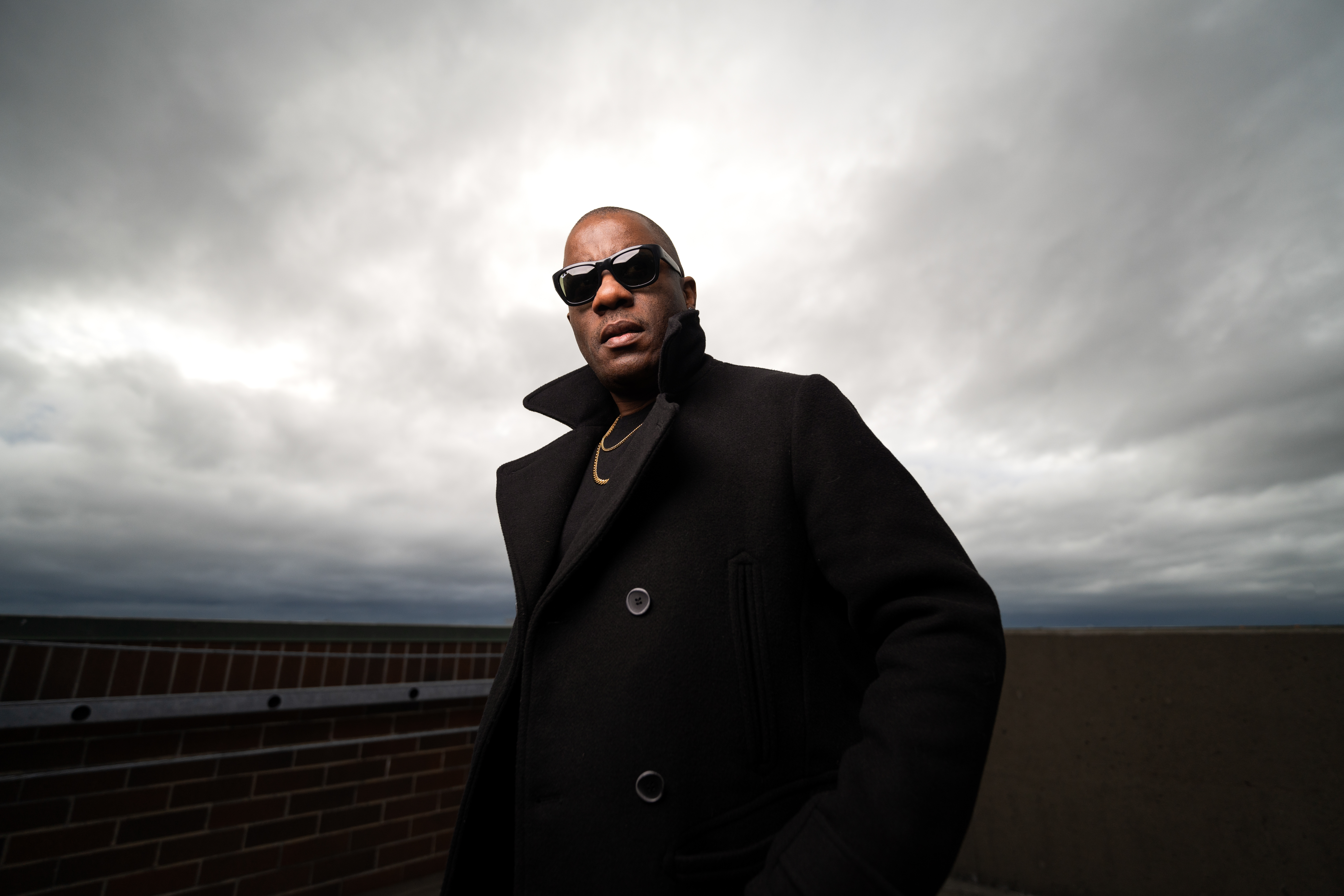
Oakland, California 2024

Corey Johnson entered the state’s foster care system at an early age. He was adopted at age four by a couple from Monroe, Louisiana. However, the home environment became abusive, leading to further instability during his formative years. Johnson often ran away from home, finding temporary shelter in parks, laundromats, and abandoned vehicles, before being returned to foster care. Throughout these hardships, he turned to imagination and creativity as a means of survival, frequently drawing, inventing characters, and making music—practices that would later form the foundation of his artistic career.

After his adoptive father, Cleotha Johnson, left the family, Johnson was primarily raised by his mother, Brenda Johnson, while continuing to navigate the foster care system. He attended Berkeley High School but flunked the ninth grade and was subsequently sent to live with relatives in Louisiana, where he enrolled at Ruben McCall High School. There, he became an honor roll student and was eventually allowed to return to Oakland, California. He completed his secondary education at Skyline High School in the Oakland Hills.

Following high school, Johnson enrolled at Chaminade University in Honolulu, Hawaii, where he studied for two years. During his time at Chaminade, he met DJ Blast at a campus event. This connection led him to travel to Maui, where he recorded his first demo at DJ Blast’s home studio. Shortly afterward, Johnson left college to pursue a full-time career as a writer and musician.

== Career ==
Sunspot Jonz has gone by other names before, such as BFAP, which stands for Brother From Another Planet, and Vision.

== Community work and education ==
In addition to his music and creative work, Johnson has been involved in community arts, education, and youth programming. In 2024, he served as a Cultural Strategist for the City of Oakland, working with the Mayor's Office on arts and cultural initiatives. He is also a co-founder of the nonprofit organization Hip Hop Scholastics, which uses hip-hop as a tool for education, creative expression, youth development, and community engagement. Through the organization, Johnson has helped develop and facilitate programs including Hip Hop Fairyland, an annual family health, education, and arts event held at Children's Fairyland in Oakland in partnership with the Oakland Unified School District (OUSD). The event has operated for four years and has included health and wellness resources, educational activities, workshops, and hip-hop performances for Oakland children and families. Johnson, through his work with Hip Hop Scholastics, has facilitated educational programs and workshops for students and educators in the Oakland and San Francisco public school systems, as well as Creative Arts Charter School in San Francisco. His work with the organization has also included hip-hop-based programs with elementary and high school students in the Hoopa community in Northern California, using hip-hop as an educational and vocational tool. Johnson has also facilitated professional-development workshops for educators through the John F. Kennedy Center for the Performing Arts, including workshops at California college campuses focused on incorporating hip-hop into classroom instruction. He has also presented an educational workshop at the Getty in Los Angeles.

== Discography ==
=== Albums ===
- Child of the Storm (2000)
- Underground Legend (2000)
- Fallen Angelz (2002)
- Don't Let 'Em Stop You (2003)
- No Guts No Glory (2004)
- Only the Strong Shall Survive (2005)
- Back in Black (2006)
- Never Surrender (2008)
- Fight-Destroy-Rock (2009)
- The Temper Twins (2009)
- The Darkside ov Heaven (2009)
- Galaxy of Dreams 1 (G.O.D.) (2010)
- Galaxy of Dreams 2 (G.O.D.) (2012)
- Skywalkers (2013)
- Legend1 (2015)
- Stoney Hawk 1 (2015)
- Cruel Summer (2020)
- Stoney Hawk 2 (2023)
- Bad 2 The Bonez (2025)
- Wolfheart (2025)

=== EPs ===
- Unleashed (2000)
- Dirty Faces (2001)
- Ghostworld (2003)

=== Guest appearances ===
- Moka Only – “Madness” from Road Life (2000)
- Moka Only – “Not the Man I Used To Know” from Lime Green (2001)
- Moka Only – “If You Was (Sunshine)” from Flood (2002)
- DJ Murge - “Drown In the Mainstream” from Search and Rescue (2002)
- Awol One & Factor Chandelier – "Darkness" from Owl Hours (2009)
- Factor Chandelier - "Black Fantasia" from 13 Stories (A Prelude) (2010)
- Factor Chandelier - "A Part of Me Now" from Club Soda Series I (2011)
- Myka 9 – "Oh Yeah... Alright" from Mykology (2012)
- Factor Chandelier - "Born Alone, Death Unknown" from Single Series (2016)
- Factor Chandelier - "Tiger Fight (Sunloa)" from Time Invested II (2022)
- Alex Asher Daniel - "Dakini (God’s Eye Mix)" (2022)
- Moka Only - “Droppin’ Icicles” from Martian XMAS 2022 (2022)

== See also ==
- Living Legends
- Luckyiam

== Filmography ==
- Resin (1999)
- Street Legendz (2009)
- Sunny Dreamweaver (2010)
- She's Got a Plan (2016)

== Bibliography ==
=== Children's books ===
·The Dentist and the Fire-Breathing Dragon (2021), Braveheart Books

·The Dentist and the Fire-Breathing Dragon Fantasy Coloring Workbook (2025), Braveheart Books

·Werewolves Want the Moon for Christmas (2025), Braveheart Books

·Bubbles the Brave: Underwater Odyssey (2026), Braveheart Books
