= Homecoming – Live from Ireland =

2018 album by Celtic Woman

Live album by Celtic Woman
- Released: 26 January 2018
- Recorded: 2 September 2017
- Venue: 3Arena, Dublin, Ireland
- Genre: Celtic, vocal, classical, adult contemporary
- Label: Manhattan Records, Universal Music Group
- Producer: Gavin Murphy, Dave Kavanagh, Shane McDonnell

Celtic Woman chronology
The Best of Christmas (2017)	Homecoming – Live from Ireland (2018)	Ancient Land (2018)

Homecoming – Live from Ireland is the first full-length live album and tenth home video release by the group Celtic Woman, released worldwide on 26 January 2018 by Manhattan Records.

== Background ==
On 20 April 2017, Celtic Woman announced a special performance of their Voices of Angels world tour at the 3Arena in Dublin, Ireland on 2 September of the same year. In July, it was confirmed that the show would be recorded as the next DVD release and concert special for American broadcaster PBS from the group.

The lead performers in the concert are vocalists Mairéad Carlin, Susan McFadden, Éabha McMahon, and instrumentalist Tara McNeill. This is the group's first concert special and home video release to feature McNeill as a lead performer, although she appeared on the group's previous home video release, Destiny, as the harpist of the accompanying live band. For this concert, McNeill performed on both the violin and harp, making it the first time that a lead instrumentalist of the group has performed more than one instrument on one of the group's home video releases.

The concert features members of the Orchestra of Ireland and the Celtic Voices Choir, both of whom appeared on the Voices of Angels album, led by music director Gavin Murphy, who produced, arranged and orchestrated the songs performed. The concert also features guest singer Anabel Sweeney from County Wicklow, Ireland, who won a competition run by the group to perform at the concert.

The concert special and DVD release, entitled Homecoming - Live From Ireland, aired on PBS stations in the United States starting in November 2017, and on television in Ireland on 1 January 2018. The special consists of a subset of songs available on the accompanying live album and DVD release, both of which were made available through PBS pledge drives prior to their official public release worldwide on 26 January 2018. The album consists entirely of live tracks, and while the first made available worldwide, is the second released by the group to do so overall (the United States-exclusive O Christmas Tree also consisted entirely of live tracks, which were taken from the DVD and Blu-ray release of Home for Christmas).

== Track listing ==
CD
No.	Title	Performer(s)	Length
1.	"Homecoming Lament"	Darragh Murphy	2:02
2.	"Mo Ghile Mear (My Gallant Star)"	Mairéad Carlin, Susan McFadden, Éabha McMahon, Tara McNeill	4:09
3.	"My Heart Will Go On"	Carlin, McFadden, McMahon, McNeill	4:26
4.	"Walk Beside Me"	Carlin, McFadden, McMahon, McNeill	4:26
5.	"Dúlamán"	Carlin	4:13
6.	"Danny Boy"	Carlin, McFadden, McMahon, McNeill	3:39
7.	"For the Love of a Princess"	McNeill	3:52
8.	"Fields of Gold"	Anabel Sweeney	3:43
9.	"Westering Home"	Carlin, McFadden, McMahon, McNeill, Sweeney	4:10
10.	"Water Under the Bridge"	Carlin, McFadden, McMahon, McNeill	3:49
11.	"The Voice"	McFadden	3:30
12.	"Ard Uí Chuain / Sadhbh Ní Bhruinneallaigh"	McMahon	4:21
13.	"You Raise Me Up"	Carlin, McFadden, McMahon, McNeill	4:07
14.	"The Kesh Inn"	Carlin, McFadden, McMahon, McNeill	3:04
15.	"Téir Abhaile Riú"	Carlin, McFadden, McMahon, McNeill	4:13
16.	"The Parting Glass"	Carlin, McFadden, McMahon, McNeill	5:05
Total length:			1:02:49

Notes

- Track 10 orchestrated by Paul Campbell.

Bonus tracks on Target edition
No.	Title	Performer(s)	Length
17.	"Time to Say Goodbye"	Carlin, McFadden, McMahon, McNeill
18.	"Amazing Grace"	Carlin, McFadden, McMahon

DVD
No.	Title	Performer(s)	Length
1.	"Homecoming Lament"	Murphy	1:56
2.	"Mo Ghile Mear (My Gallant Star)"	Carlin, McFadden, McMahon, McNeill	4:24
3.	"My Heart Will Go On"	Carlin, McFadden, McMahon, McNeill	4:29
4.	"Across the World"	McNeill	3:42
5.	"Walk Beside Me"	Carlin, McFadden, McMahon, McNeill	4:28
6.	"Dúlamán"	Carlin	4:03
7.	"She Moved Through the Fair"	McFadden	3:58
8.	"Isle of Hope, Isle of Tears"	McMahon	5:29
9.	"Danny Boy"	Carlin, McFadden, McMahon, McNeill	3:43
10.	"Fields of Gold"	Sweeney	3:42
11.	"Westering Home"	Carlin, McFadden, McMahon, McNeill, Sweeney	4:22
12.	"Amazing Grace"	Carlin, McFadden, McMahon	5:38
13.	"For the Love of a Princess"	McNeill	3:50
14.	"Ave Maria"	Carlin	3:03
15.	"Floorplay"	Anthony Byrne, Ray Fean, Caítriona Frost	2:14
16.	"Ard Uí Chuain / Sadhbh Ní Bhruinneallaigh"	McMahon	4:53
17.	"The Voice"	McFadden	3:26
18.	"Time to Say Goodbye"	Carlin, McFadden, McMahon, McNeill	4:10
19.	"You Raise Me Up"	Carlin, McFadden, McMahon, McNeill	4:49
20.	"The Kesh Inn"	Carlin, McFadden, McMahon, McNeill	3:10
21.	"Téir Abhaile Riú"	Carlin, McFadden, McMahon, McNeill	4:09
22.	"The Parting Glass"	Carlin, McFadden, McMahon, McNeill	4:33
Total length:			1:28:11

== Personnel ==
Per the liner notes.

Celtic Woman

- Mairéad Carlin – vocals, accordion
- Susan McFadden – vocals, spoons
- Éabha McMahon – vocals, tin whistle
- Tara McNeill – fiddle, harp

Celtic Woman Band

- Ray Fean – percussion
- Caítriona Frost – percussion
- Tommy Buckley – guitar
- Anthony Byrne – bagpipes
- Darragh Murphy – uilleann pipes

The Orchestra of Ireland

- Joe Csibi – orchestra contractor

Celtic Voices Choir

- Paul McGough – choir co-ordinator

Special guest

- Anabel Sweeney – vocals

Production

- Gavin Murphy – musical direction
- Méav Ní Mhaolchatha – vocal direction
- Tim Martin – recording and mixing
- Andy Walter – mastering
- Caroline Nesbitt, Designedly – design, art direction

== Charts ==
Chart (2018)	Peak position
Irish Albums (IRMA)	14
