= Voices of Angels =

Celtic Woman: Voices of Angels

Studio album by Celtic Woman
- Released: 18 November 2016 (US, Canada and Ireland); 30 March 2017 (Europe)
- Recorded: 12–13, 15 August 2016
- Studio: Cauldron Studios, Dublin, Ireland
- Genre: Celtic, world, new-age, classical
- Length: 1:13:41
- Language: English, Irish, Italian, Latin
- Label: Manhattan Records
- Producer: Gavin Murphy

Celtic Woman chronology
Destiny (2015)	Celtic Woman: Voices of Angels (2016)	The Best of Christmas (2017)

Voices of Angels is the eleventh studio album released by the group Celtic Woman.

== Background ==
The album was recorded at Cauldron Studios in Dublin, Ireland with the seventy-two-piece RTÉ National Symphony Orchestra of Ireland in August 2016, and includes a mixture of original songs, new covers and re-arranged versions of previous Celtic Woman covers.

Voices of Angels features vocalists Susan McFadden, Mairéad Carlin, Éabha McMahon, and fiddler and harpist Tara McNeill, with a guest appearance by former member and current vocal director Méav Ní Mhaolchatha. This is the group's first album to feature McNeill as their newest member (at the time).

A digital-download copy of the album was made available as part of a ticket presale for the group's 2017 Voices of Angels tour in the United States, Canada, Japan, Europe, and Australia.

== Track listing ==
CD
No.	Title	Performer(s)	Length
1.	"My Heart Will Go On"	Mairéad Carlin, Susan McFadden, Éabha McMahon, Tara McNeill	4:21
2.	"Isle of Hope, Isle of Tears"	McMahon	5:01
3.	"As She Moved Through the Fair" (2016 Version)	McFadden	3:55
4.	"Mo Ghile Mear (My Gallant Star)"	Carlin, McMahon, McFadden, McNeill	3:36
5.	"Ave Maria" (2016 Version)	Carlin	2:56
6.	"For the Love of a Princess"	McNeill	3:49
7.	"Time to Say Goodbye"	Carlin, McMahon, McFadden, McNeill	4:01
8.	"Dúlamán" (2016 Version)	Méav Ní Mhaolchatha	4:18
9.	"Walk Beside Me" (2016 Version)	Carlin, McMahon, McFadden, McNeill	4:40
10.	"O, America!" (2016 Version)	Carlin, McMahon, McFadden, McNeill, Ní Mhaolchatha	4:57
11.	"A Time for Us"	Carlin, McNeill	4:01
12.	"Across the World"	McNeill	3:35
13.	"Téir Abhaile Riú" (2016 Version)	Carlin, McMahon, McFadden, McNeill	3:53
14.	"Amazing Grace" (2016 Version)	Carlin, McMahon, McFadden	4:34
15.	"You Raise Me Up" (2016 Version)	Carlin, McMahon, McFadden, McNeill	4:10
16.	"Joy to the World" (2016 Version)	Carlin, McMahon, McFadden, McNeill	3:29
17.	"Silent Night" (2016 Version)	Carlin, McMahon, McFadden, McNeill	4:10
18.	"Once in Royal David's City"	Carlin, McMahon, McFadden, McNeill	4:08
Total length:			1:13:41

Bonus tracks on Target edition
No.	Title	Performer(s)	Length
16.	"Níl Sé'n Lá" (2016 Version)	Carlin, McMahon, McFadden, McNeill	3:34
17.	"Danny Boy" (2016 Version)	Carlin, McMahon, McFadden, McNeill	3:30
18.	"Joy to the World" (2016 Version)	Carlin, McMahon, McFadden, McNeill	3:29
19.	"Silent Night" (2016 Version)	Carlin, McMahon, McFadden, McNeill	4:10
20.	"Once in Royal David's City"	Carlin, McMahon, McFadden, McNeill	4:08
Total length:			1:20:45

Notes

- Tracks 14 and 15 were not available on digital-download versions of the album.
- Tracks 2, 7 and 15 orchestrated by Paul Campbell.

Chilean special edition track listing
No.	Title	Performer(s)	Length
1.	"My Heart Will Go On"	Carlin, McMahon, McFadden, McNeill	4:21
2.	"Isle of Hope, Isle of Tears"	McMahon	5:01
3.	"As She Moved Through the Fair" (2016 Version)	McFadden	3:55
4.	"Mo Ghile Mear (My Gallant Star)"	Carlin, McMahon, McFadden, McNeill	3:36
5.	"Ave Maria" (2016 Version)	Carlin	2:56
6.	"For the Love of a Princess"	McNeill	3:49
7.	"Time to Say Goodbye"	Carlin, McMahon, McFadden, McNeill	4:01
8.	"Dúlamán" (2016 Version)	Ní Mhaolchatha	4:18
9.	"Walk Beside Me" (2016 Version)	Carlin, McMahon, McFadden, McNeill	4:40
10.	"O, America!" (2016 Version)	Carlin, McMahon, McFadden, McNeill, Ní Mhaolchatha	4:57
11.	"A Time for Us"	Carlin, McNeill	4:01
12.	"Across the World"	McNeill	3:35
13.	"Téir Abhaile Riú" (2016 Version)	Carlin, McMahon, McFadden, McNeill	3:53
14.	"Danny Boy" (2016 Version)	Carlin, McMahon, McFadden, McNeill	3:30
15.	"Orinoco Flow"	Órla Fallon, Lisa Kelly, Ní Mhaolchatha	3:32
16.	"You Raise Me Up" (2016 Version)	Carlin, McMahon, McFadden, McNeill	4:10
17.	"Joy to the World" (2016 Version)	Carlin, McMahon, McFadden, McNeill	3:29
18.	"Silent Night" (2016 Version)	Carlin, McMahon, McFadden, McNeill	4:10
19.	"Christmas Pipes"	Chloë Agnew, Fallon, Kelly, Máiréad Nesbitt, Ní Mhaolchatha	3:50
20.	"Once in Royal David's City"	Carlin, McMahon, McFadden, McNeill	4:08
Total length:			1:16:29

Notes

- Tracks 2, 7 and 16 orchestrated by Paul Campbell.
- Track 15 was originally released on the original Celtic Woman album.
- Track 19 was originally released on the album A Christmas Celebration.
- Tracks 15 and 19 were produced by David Downes.

2017 European deluxe edition track listing
No.	Title	Performer(s)	Length
1.	"My Heart Will Go On"	Carlin, McFadden, McMahon, McNeill	4:21
2.	"Isle of Hope, Isle of Tears"	McMahon	5:01
3.	"Mo Ghile Mear (My Gallant Star)"	Carlin, McFadden, McMahon, McNeill	3:36
4.	"Ave Maria" (2016 Version)	Carlin	2:56
5.	"Time to Say Goodbye"	Carlin, McFadden, McMahon, McNeill	4:01
6.	"Dúlamán" (2016 Version)	Ní Mhaolchatha	4:18
7.	"Walk Beside Me" (2016 Version)	Carlin, McFadden, McMahon, McNeill	4:40
8.	"Danny Boy" (2017 Short Intro)	Carlin, McFadden, McMahon, McNeill	3:30
9.	"Across the World"	McNeill	3:35
10.	"Amazing Grace" (2016 Version)	Carlin, McFadden, McMahon	4:34
11.	"You Raise Me Up" (2016 Version)	Carlin, McFadden, McMahon, McNeill	4:10
12.	"I See Fire"	Carlin, Nesbitt	5:07
13.	"Caledonia" (2013 Version)	McFadden	4:59
14.	"May it Be"	Kelly	3:45
15.	"The Ashoken Farewell / The Contradiction" (Live)	Nesbitt	4:10
16.	"Orinoco Flow"	Fallon, Kelly, Ní Mhaolchatha	3:32
17.	"Bridge Over Troubled Water"	Agnew, Kelly, Lisa Lambe	4:03
18.	"Vivaldi's Rain"	Agnew	2:12
19.	"Fields of Gold"	Kelly	3:51
20.	"The Voice" (2013 Version)	McFadden, Nesbitt	3:10
Total length:			1:19:31

Notes

- Tracks 2, 5 and 11 orchestrated by Paul Campbell.
- Track 12 was originally released on the album Destiny.
- Track 13 was originally released on the album A New Journey and performed by Lisa Kelly. The arrangement featured, performed by Susan McFadden, appeared on the album Emerald - Musical Gems.
- Tracks 14–16 were originally released on the original Celtic Woman album.
- Track 17 was originally released on the album Believe.
- Track 18 was originally released on the album A New Journey.
- Track 19 was originally released on the album Songs from the Heart.
- Track 20 was originally released on the album A New Journey with vocals by Lisa Kelly. The arrangement featured, with vocals by Susan McFadden, appeared on the album Emerald - Musical Gems.
- Tracks 13–20 were produced by David Downes.

== Personnel ==
Celtic Woman

- Mairéad Carlin – vocals
- Susan McFadden – vocals
- Éabha McMahon – vocals
- Tara McNeill – fiddle, Irish harp
- Méav Ní Mhaolchatha – vocals

The Orchestra of Ireland

- Joe Csibi – orchestra contractor, conductor

Celtic Voices Choir

- Paul McGough – choir co-ordinator

Production

- Gavin Murphy – musical director, album producer, arrangements, orchestrations
- Méav Ní Mhaolchatha – vocal director
- Paul Campbell – additional orchestrations (tracks 2, 7 and 15)
- David Montuy, David McCune – additional recording and editing
- Tim Martin – recording, mixing, orchestra and choir recording
- Mark Thomas Dwyer, Ciaran Byrne – orchestra recording
- Rachel Conlan – choir recording
- Andy Walter – album mastering

== Charts ==
=== Weekly charts ===
Chart (2016–18)	Peak position
Australian Albums (ARIA)	34
US Top Classical Albums (Billboard)	1
US Digital Albums (Billboard)	17
US World Albums (Billboard)	1

=== Year-end charts ===
Chart (2017)	Position
US Top Classical Albums (Billboard)	2
Chart (2018)	Position
US Top Classical Albums (Billboard)	30

This was the first Celtic Woman album to appear on the Billboard Classical Albums chart. The album also debuted at No. 1 on the Billboard Biz Classical Crossover chart.

The album appeared on the Billboard World Albums chart for 48 consecutive weeks. As of 27 December 2017, the album had spent 53 weeks on the chart, including 14 weeks at No. 1.
