= Ride On (Christy Moore album) =

Studio album by Christy Moore
- Released: 1984
- Recorded: March 1984
- Genre: Folk
- Length: 40:49
- Label: WEA Ireland (Ireland); Green Linnet (United States)
- Producer: Dónal Lunny

Christy Moore chronology
| The Time Has Come (1983) | Ride On (1984) | Ordinary Man (1985) |

Ride On is an album by Irish folk singer Christy Moore, released in 1984. Its title track remains one of his most popular songs. A number of songs relate the actions of those involved in political struggles, or those affected by those struggles; such as "Viva la Quinte Brigada" which is concerned with the Irish contingent amongst the International Brigade in the Spanish Civil War; or "El Salvador" dealing with the civil war in that country in the 1980s. Other songs deal with Irish history – "The City of Chicago", about emigration to America during the Irish famines of the late 1840s; "Back Home in Derry" written by Bobby Sands about the transportation to Australia of convicts; and "Lisdoonvarna" celebrating the Lisdoonvarna Music Festival that took place annually near that town until the early 1980s.

== Reception ==
Professional ratings
Review scores
| Source | Rating |
|---|---|
| Allmusic | 4.5/5 stars |

Since Ride On is widely accepted as a landmark Moore album, it has been available ever since its original release and is regarded as one of the best possible introductions to the artist. The title track was written by one of Ireland's most famous songwriters, Jimmy MacCarthy, and many other artists have interpreted the song.

== Track listing ==
1. "The City of Chicago" (Barry Moore)
2. "Ride On" (Jimmy MacCarthy)
3. "Viva la Quinta Brigada" (Christy Moore)
4. "The Song of Wandering Aengus" (William Butler Yeats, Travis Edmonson)
5. "McIlhatton" (Bobby Sands)
6. "Lisdoonvarna" (Christy Moore)
7. "Among The Wicklow Hills" (Pierce Turner)
8. "Sonny's Dream" (Ron Hynes)
9. "The Dying Soldier" (Ger Costelloe)
10. "El Salvador" (Johnny Duhan)
11. "Back Home in Derry" (Bobby Sands, Gordon Lightfoot)
12. "The Least We Can Do" (Gerry Murray)

== Personnel ==
- Christy Moore – guitar, bodhran, vocals
- Declan Sinnott – acoustic & Spanish guitar, violin, vocals
- Dónal Lunny – bouzouki, bodhran, vocals

== Cover versions ==
Due to the success of the version Moore recorded on this album, "Ride On" has been covered by many other artists in subsequent years.

- This song was a hit for Irish jazz singer Mary Coughlan in 1987 on her album Under the Influence.
- In 1991 "Ride On" was released by its writer Jimmy MacCarthy on his debut solo album The Song of the Singing Horseman.
- More recently newer Irish band Celtic Thunder have recorded "Ride On".
- Australian band Molly Rusher has also covered this song.
- Cleatormoor Band The Black Guards (formerly D'Bleedin Blaggards) from West Cumbria UK have also paid homage to Christy with their soulful & lilting rendition of "Ride On" featuring Owen Evans on accordion from Iron Sea Wolf.
- Canadian/Taiwanese recording artist Kandy Chen also covered this song in 1992.
- Irish Celtic Metal band Cruachan released their version with Shane MacGowan as a single in 2001 and on their 2002 album Folk-Lore.
- Dutch folk band Rapalje has covered the song in their Rakish Paddies (2000) album, while also executing a live version of the song.
- British band Coldplay joined Christy Moore for a rendition of "Ride On" to close the 2011 Oxegen Festival in Ireland on Sunday, 10 July 2011
- Russian dark-folk band Neutral covered the song on their live album Luisenkirche, Königsberg in 2006.
- English band Crustation has covered the song in their album Bloom in 1997
- Canadian astronaut Chris Hadfield performed "Ride On" with NASA astronaut Catherine Coleman accompanying him on flute at the United Space School's traditional Mexican Night in 2012. They dedicated the song to the late space pioneer Sally Ride.
- Americana singer-songwriter Dave Hawkins also performs this song. He also included it in his 2015 release, Stripped Down.
- Mairéad Carlin and Éabha McMahon covered this song on Irish music group Celtic Woman's 2015 album Destiny, accompanied by Máiréad Nesbitt on the fiddle.
