= Emerald – Musical Gems =

Studio album by Celtic Woman
- Released: 25 February 2014
- Recorded: 2013
- Venue: Morris Performing Arts Center, South Bend, Indiana, United States
- Studio: STUDIOTWO, Windmill Lane Studios, RTÉ Studio One, Dublin, Ireland; Ocean Way Studios, Los Angeles, California, United States
- Genre: Celtic, classical, new-age
- Length: 45:15
- Language: English, Irish
- Label: Manhattan
- Producer: David Downes

Celtic Woman chronology
Home for Christmas (2012)	Emerald – Musical Gems (2014)	O Christmas Tree (2014)

Emerald – Musical Gems is the ninth studio album released by the group Celtic Woman.

== Background ==
Emerald – Musical Gems was released worldwide on 25 February 2014. The album features vocalists Chloë Agnew, Susan McFadden, Lisa Lambe, and fiddler Máiréad Nesbitt. Agnew had left the group prior to the release of this album, making it the last to feature her as a principal performer until she returned as a guest performer for 2021's Postcards from Ireland. Unlike previous releases, while classified as a studio album, the track listing of Emerald – Musical Gems consists of re-recordings of songs previously covered by the group. Coincidentally this album was also the last to feature Lisa Lambe as a member, she took leave for most of the supporting "Emerald Tour" in 2014 before officially announcing her departure at the end of 2014.

An accompanying concert special of the same title, recorded live at the Morris Performing Arts Center, South Bend, Indiana, United States in April 2013, was also released on DVD and Blu-ray in conjunction with the album, and aired on PBS stations across the United States in March 2014.

== Track listing ==
CD
No.	Title	Performer(s)	Length
1.	"Mo Ghile Mear"	Chloë Agnew, Lisa Lambe, Susan McFadden, Máiréad Nesbitt	4:17
2.	"Dúlaman"	Lambe	4:20
3.	"Caledonia"	McFadden	5:00
4.	"Amazing Grace"	Agnew, Lambe, McFadden	5:50
5.	"The New Ground" (instrumental)	Tommy Martin	2:04
6.	"She Moved Through the Fair"	Agnew, Lambe	3:18
7.	"Bridge Over Troubled Water"	Lambe	2:59
8.	"Níl Sé'n Lá"	Agnew, Lambe, McFadden, Nesbitt	3:36
9.	"Danny Boy"	Agnew, Lambe, McFadden, Nesbitt	3:16
10.	"The Voice"	McFadden, Nesbitt	3:07
11.	"The Parting Glass" (2013 Version)	Agnew, Lambe, McFadden, Nesbitt	4:17
12.	"You Raise Me Up"	Agnew, Lambe, McFadden, Nesbitt	4:40
Total length:			45:15

Notes

- "Dúlaman" contains portions of "An Cailín Álainn", a traditional Irish sean-nós song.

Bonus tracks on Target-exclusive deluxe edition
No.	Title	Performer(s)	Length
13.	"The Coast of Galiçia" (Live from Morris Performing Arts Center, South Bend, IN, 2013)	Nesbitt	4:42
14.	"Téir Abhaile Riú" (Live from Morris Performing Arts Center, South Bend, IN, 2013)	Agnew, Lambe, McFadden, Nesbitt	5:10
15.	"Ave Maria" (Live from Morris Performing Arts Center, South Bend, IN, 2013)	Agnew	4:18
Total length:			59:25

Bonus tracks on Japanese edition
No.	Title	Performer(s)	Length
13.	"The Coast of Galiçia" (Live from Morris Performing Arts Center, South Bend, IN, 2013)	Nesbitt	4:42
14.	"Téir Abhaile Riú" (Live from Morris Performing Arts Center, South Bend, IN, 2013)	Agnew, Lambe, McFadden, Nesbitt	5:10
Total length:			55:07

DVD and Blu-ray
No.	Title	Performer(s)	Length
1.	"Awakening"	Agnew, Lambe, McFadden, Nesbitt	5:58
2.	"Dúlaman"	Lambe	4:33
3.	"Nocturne"	Agnew, Nesbitt	4:25
4.	"Téir Abhaile Riú"	Agnew, Lambe, McFadden, Nesbitt	6:28
5.	"The Coast of Galiçia"	Nesbitt	4:40
6.	"Danny Boy"	Agnew, Lambe, McFadden, Nesbitt	4:20
7.	"Mo Ghile Mear"	Agnew, Lambe, McFadden, Nesbitt	5:02
8.	"Amazing Grace"	Agnew, Lambe, McFadden	5:59
9.	"She Moved Through the Fair"	Agnew, Lambe	3:36
10.	"Níl Sé'n Lá"	Agnew, Lambe, McFadden, Nesbitt	7:56
11.	"Shenandoah"	Nesbitt	4:05
12.	"The Voice"	McFadden, Nesbitt	3:22
13.	"You Raise Me Up"	Agnew, Lambe, McFadden, Nesbitt	5:30
14.	"The Parting Glass"	Agnew, Lambe, McFadden, Nesbitt	5:27
15.	"Celtic Woman Playoff"	Nesbitt	0:51
Total length:			1:12:12

Bonus tracks on DVD and Blu-ray
No.	Title	Performer(s)	Length
16.	"Caledonia"	McFadden	5:37
17.	"Bridge Over Troubled Water"	Lambe	4:57
18.	"Ave Maria"	Agnew	4:17
Total length:			1:27:03

== Charts ==
The album debuted at No. 29 on the Billboard 200 albums chart on its first week of release, with around 10,000 copies sold in the United States. It also debuted at No. 1 on the Billboard World Albums chart and No. 3 on the Independent Albums charts. As of December 2015, the album has sold 73,000 copies in the country.

Chart (2014)	Peak position
Belgian Albums (Ultratop Flanders)	157
Dutch Albums (Album Top 100)	84
Swiss Albums (Schweizer Hitparade)	80
US Billboard 200	28
US World Albums (Billboard)	1
US Independent Albums (Billboard)	3
