= Siúil a Rúin =

Traditional Irish song

"Siúil a Rúin" (Roud 911) is a traditional Irish song, sung from the point of view of a woman lamenting a lover who has embarked on a military career, and indicating her willingness to support him. The song has English language verses and an Irish language chorus, a style known as macaronic.

The title (pronounced [ˌʃuːlʲ ə ˈɾˠuːnʲ]) translates to "go, my love" (or variants): siúil is an imperative, literally translating to "walk!", a rúin is a term of endearment.

== History ==
The history of the song is unclear. It has been suggested that the song refers to the "Wild Geese" of the Glorious Revolution. If it does, however, the original version has probably been lost. It is not uncommon that Irish songs were translated into English, with their chorus surviving in Irish, or being transformed into nonsense words (see Caleno custure me), but in most of these cases, some of the Irish version still survives. It is possible that the song was composed in the 19th century with the conscious intention of styling it after older songs.

As is common in folk music, many lyrical variants of the song exist.

Robert Louis Stevenson refers to the song twice in his novel The Master of Ballantrae (1889). Referred to as "the pathetic air of 'Shule Aroon'", it is whistled by the Irish Jacobite exile Francis Burke and later sung by the Master of Ballantrae himself to impress his younger brother's wife. The Master describes it as "very moving" and describes it being sung by Jacobite exiles in France: "it is a pathetic sight when a score of rough Irish ... get to this song; and you may see, by their falling tears, how it strikes home to them".

In Ulysses, James Joyce had Stephen Dedalus sing the song to Leopold Bloom in Bloom's kitchen (as part of the Ithaca episode). The song can be seen to signal or echo many of the grand themes of the book, referencing loss of language, usurpation, betrayal, loss of leadership and women selling themselves. Bloom responds by singing a song in Hebrew.

"Johnny Has Gone for a Soldier"/"Buttermilk Hill" is a well-known American variant dating to the Revolutionary War, sharing a common melody and similar lyrics.

== Modern performance ==
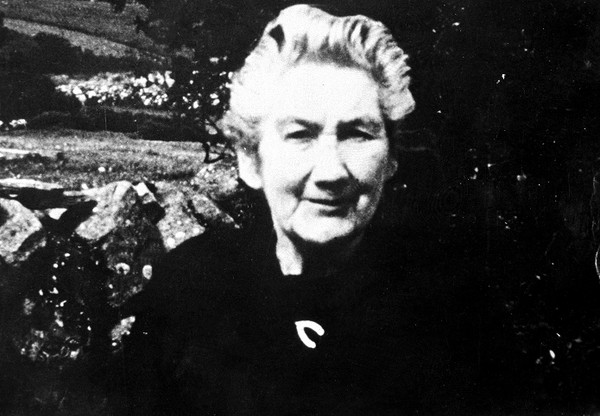
Elizabeth Cronin (1879–1956)

Folklorist and ethnomusicologist Alan Lomax recorded Elizabeth Cronin singing Siúil a Rúin ("Shule Agra", literally "Walk, O Love") in the early 1950s, and both the lyrics and the tune of her version are seemingly the foundation of most subsequent recordings, including those of Clannad and Celtic Woman. Her performance can be heard online via the Alan Lomax archive.

"Siúil a Rúin" is one of the most widely sung songs in the Irish repertoire. Well-known performances are by Clannad from their album Dúlamán and Mary Black on different occasions, e.g. on the BBC's "The Highland Sessions" or with Altan on "Altan Beo – 21 Bliain ag Ceol".

Recordings include Nita Conley Korn and Eileen Estes on their album "The Apple Tree Project," Scantily Plaid on their album, "Just Checking In", Édain on "JOYceFUL", Éilís Kennedy on "One Sweet Kiss", Tríona Ní Dhomhnaill on Donal Lunny's Coolfin, Allison Barber on "Traveling Home", Órla Fallon from Celtic Woman on the album of the same name, Lisa Kelly (who was also with Celtic Woman) on "Lisa", Ciúnas on "Celtic Tiger", Aoife Ní Fhearraigh on "If I Told You", Maighréad Ní Dhomhnaill & Iarla Ó Lionáird on "Sult", Anúna on "Invocation" with Lucy Champion, Connie Dover on "The Wishing Well", Akelarre Agrocelta on "La Amenaza Celta", Nora Butler on Geantraí and Siobhan Owen on "Purely Celtic".

The song has also been recorded by Kate Price, Lintie, Acabella, Anam, The Irish Group, Caoilte Ó Súilleabháin, Nollaig Casey, Kate Crossan, Carmel Gunning, Rosheen, Sissel Kyrkjebo with the Chieftains, Sarah English, Janette Geri, and Bruadar. "Siúil a Rúin" is one of the songs in Flatley's Lord of the Dance. Versions of "Buttermilk Hill" have been performed by The Black Country Three, Dan Gibson, Alisa Jones, Julie Felix, Judy Collins, Noah Saterstrom and The Weavers.

A recognisable version of this song was recorded by Peter, Paul, and Mary entitled Gone The Rainbow. It was on the B-side of The Hammer Song.

In the 2022 documentary film North Circular, the song is performed live from the back room of The Cobblestone Pub in Smithfield in Dublin by Julie Kavanagh, a singer formerly of the band Twin-Headed Wolf.

On April 25, 2022, a Ukrainian YouTube-singer Eileen published an adapted version Йди, коханий мій (literally Walk My Love) on her channel. This version resonates with the strengthening of the Russian offensive in 2022 during the Russo-Ukrainian war.

The music has been used for the song "The Hanging Tree" in the movie "The Hunger Games: The Ballad of Songbirds & Snakes" (2023).

== Recordings and performances ==
- Na Casaidigh – Siúil, a Ghrá (Farewell My Love) (13) (1961) (The Cassidys)
- Judy Collins – Shule aroon (Golden Apples of the Sun) (1962)
- Clannad – Siúil a Rúin (Dulaman – 07) (1976)
- Pentangle - Süil Agrar (In the Round) (1986)
- Chrissie Cullen – Siúil a Rúin (1992)
- Anúna – Siúil a Rúin (Invocation – 11) (1994)
- Lord of the Dance (musical) – Siúil a Rúin (Lord of the Dance – 02) (1996)
- Maighréad Ní Dhomhnaill & Iarla Ó Lionáird, – Siúil a Rúin (Sult – 09) (1997)
- Kate Price – Siúil a Rúin (Deep Heart's Core – 08) (1997)
- Sissel Kyrkjebo & the Chieftains – Siúil a Rúin (Tears of Stone −12) (1999)
- Celtic Woman (Órla Fallon) – Siúil a Rúin (walk my love) (Celtic Woman – 08) (2004)
- Mary Black – Siúil a Rúin (Full Tide – 09) (2005)
- Mary Black – Siúil a Rúin (The Highland Sessions – BBC4 2005 – Killiecrankie, Perthshire)
- Lisa Kelly – Siúil a Rúin (Lisa – 01) (2005)
- Cécile Corbel – Suil a Ruin (Songbook 1 – 01) (2006)
- Aoife Ní Fhearraigh – Siúil a Rúin (If I Told You – 09) (2006)
- Anúna – Siúil a Rúin (Celtic Origins DVD, Trinity Cathedral Ohio 2007)
- Jim Causley – Shulé Rune (Lost Love Found – 05) (2007)
- Chitose Hajime – Siuil a Run (Hotaru Boshi – 03) (2008)
- Ellie Robbins – Siúil a Rúin (Folk Collection, Vol.1) (2008)
- Kokia – Siúil A Rúin (Fairy Dance: Kokia Meets Ireland – 06) (2008)
- Siobhan Owen – Siúil a Rúin (Purely Celtic – 08) (2008)
- Nolwenn Leroy – Siúil a Rúin (Bretonne – 19) (2010)
- Runa – Siúil a Rúin (Stretched on Your Grave) (2011)
- Iarla Ó Lionáird & Steve Cooney – Féile An Droichead/The An Droichead Festival, Belfast. 24 August 2012
- Siobhan Owen – Siúil a Rúin (Storybook Journey 08) (2012)
- Faun – Wilde Rose (Von den Elben – 06), a German-language adaptation to the same tune and with broadly similar lyrical themes (2013)
- Owen & Moley O'Súilleabháin – Siúil a Rúin (Filleadh: Sacred Songs – 05) (2013)
- Celtic Woman (Mairead Carlin, Eabha McMahon, Susan McFadden, with fiddler Mairead Nesbitt) – Siúil a Rúin (Destiny) (2015). McMahon provides vocals and tin whistle with Tara McNeill on the harp in a newer version – Siúil a Rúin (Ancient Land) (2018)
- Leah – Siúil a Rúin (Kings & Queens) (2015)
- Jenne Lennon – Siúil a Rúin (Songs and Stillness) (2015)
- Elizabeth Cronin – Siúil a Rúin (Folksongs of Britain, Vol 1, Songs of Courtship – 10)
- Maighréad Ní Dhomhnaill & Tríona Ní Dhomhnaill – Siúil a Rúin (Donal Lunny's Coolfin – 11)
- Len Graham & Skylark – Siúil a Rúin (The Celts Rise Again – 11)
- Carmel Gunning – Siúil a Rúin (The Lakes of Sligo – 04)
- Seo Linn – Siúil a Rúin (Single) (2021)
- Hayley Griffiths – Siúil a Rúin (Single) (2023)
- Yamamo Maya & Ryosuke Tomita Suil A Ruin (2023)
- Melanie Mau and Martin Schnella – Siúil a Rúin (The Rainbow Tree – 14) (2023)
- Roisin El Cherif Siúil a Rúin (2024)
- Colm R. McGuinness Siúil a Rúin (2024)

== See also ==
- Music of Ireland
- Irish Ballads
