= The Moorlough Shore =

Traditional song

The Moorlough Shore (Roud 2946) is a traditional Irish love song aka "The Banks of the Moorlough Shore", or "The Maid of Mourne/Moorlough Shore", or "Mourne Shore".

== Synopsis ==
A young man praises the beauties of the countryside and the girl he has fallen in love with. She refuses his advances on the ground that she already loves a sailor. She will wait for her true love for seven years. In frustration the boy leaves his childhood home and sails away, still praising the girl he loves that lives by the Moorlough Shore. The song is set in Strabane, and local names and places along the River Mourne are mentioned.

== Released versions ==
The earliest version is a broadside in the Bodleian Library, dated 1886. The song is discussed in the "Journal of the Irish folk Song Society" in 1905 and 1911. In the 1940s Helen Hartness Flanders found a version in Vermont.

There are notable recordings by:

- "John McGettigan & his Irish Minstrels" on a single released in the 1930s in the USA
- Paddy Tunney on the album Man of Songs (1963)
- Peta Webb on the album I Have Wandered in Exile (1973)
- The Boys of the Lough on the album Regrouped (1980)
- Yorkshire Garland on the album The Twiddley-Men Tapes (1983)
- Dolores Keane on the album Lion in a Cage (1989)
- Caroline Lavelle on the album Spirit (1995)
- Patrick Street on the album Corner Boys (1996)
- Susan McKeown on the album Lowlands (2000)
- Sinéad O'Connor on the album Sean-Nós Nua (2002)
- Karine Polwart on the compilation album Fishing Music I (2003)
- Emm Gryner on the album Songs of Love and Death (2005)
- The Corrs on the album Home (2005)
- Celtic Woman on the album Ancient Land, sang by Eabha McMahon (2018)

== Other versions ==
After the Easter Rising in Ireland, the parish priest Canon Charles O’Neil wrote the lyrics for the well known political song Foggy Dew to this air.

== See also ==
- List of folk songs by Roud number (Nº 2742)
- The Mountains of Mourne
