= Destiny (Celtic Woman album) =

Celtic Woman: Destiny

Studio album by Celtic Woman
- Released: 15 January 2016
- Recorded: August 2015
- Genre: Celtic, new-age
- Language: English, Irish
- Label: Manhattan
- Producer: Gavin Murphy; Chris O'Brien (tracks 4–5, 7, 15); Graham Murphy (tracks 4–5, 7, 15); Bernd Wendlandt (track 13); William Andrews (track 13); Hartmut Krech (track 8); Mark Nissen (track 8); Johannes Braun (track 8)

Celtic Woman chronology
O Christmas Tree (2014)	Celtic Woman: Destiny (2016)	Voices of Angels (2016)

Destiny is the tenth studio album released by the group Celtic Woman.

== Background ==
On 5 August 2015, Celtic Woman announced that a special unnamed free-to-attend-but-ticketed concert performance would be taking place and recorded in the Round Room at the Mansion House, Dublin, Ireland, residence of the Lord Mayor of Dublin since 1715 and where the first Dáil proclaimed the Irish Declaration of Independence in 1919, on 13 August 2015. Due to high demand from audiences based in the United States, the group confirmed on 7 August that the performance would be their next concert special for American broadcaster PBS. The concert began airing on PBS stations across the United States in late 2015 and was released on DVD and Blu-ray in early 2016.

Destiny features vocalists Mairéad Carlin, Susan McFadden, and Éabha McMahon and fiddler Máiréad Nesbitt, with vocal director and former member Méav Ní Mhaolchatha and German singer Oonagh as guest performers, and vocalist, harpist and member of Irish choral group Anúna Rebecca Winckworth as an additional guest performer on the PBS special. It is the first album released by the group to feature Carlin and McMahon.

The group toured eighty-five cities in North America in support of the album, which was also nominated for Best World Music Album at the 59th Annual Grammy Awards; the first nomination at the awards for the group.

== Track listing ==
CD
No.	Title	Writer(s)	Performer(s)	Length
1.	"My Land"	Brendan Graham; Rolf Løvland; Alana Graham	Mairéad Carlin; Susan McFadden; Éabha McMahon; Máiréad Nesbitt	4:04
2.	"Siúil a Rún"	Traditional (arranged by David Downes)	Carlin; McFadden; McMahon; Nesbitt	2:59
3.	"Ride On"	Jimmy McCarthy	Carlin; McMahon; Nesbitt	3:55
4.	"The Whole of the Moon"	Mike Scott	McFadden; Nesbitt	4:05
5.	"Skyrim Theme (Dragonborn)"	Jeremy Soule (Irish Gaelic lyrics by Gavin Murphy)	Nesbitt	3:11
6.	"How Can I Keep from Singing"	Robert Lowry	McMahon	4:17
7.	"I See Fire"	Ed Sheeran	Carlin; Nesbitt	5:07
8.	"Tír na nÓg" (featuring Oonagh)	Hartmut Krech; Mark Nissen; Johannes Braun; Lukas Hainer	Carlin; McFadden; McMahon; Nesbitt	3:08
9.	"Oró Sé Do Bheatha 'Bhaile"	Traditional (arranged by Gavin Murphy and Méav Ní Mhaolchatha)	Méav Ní Mhaolchatha; Carlin; McFadden; McMahon; Nesbitt	3:12
10.	"Sometimes a Prayer Will Do"	Brendan Graham; Rolf Løvland	McFadden	4:40
11.	"Bean Pháidín"	Traditional (arranged by Gavin Murphy)	Carlin; McFadden; McMahon; Nesbitt	3:30
12.	"Westering Home"	Traditional (arranged by Gavin Murphy)	Carlin; McFadden; McMahon; Nesbitt	4:00
13.	"When You Go"	Bernd Wendlandt; William Andrews	Carlin; McFadden; McMahon; Nesbitt	3:29
14.	"Like an Angel Passing Through My Room"	Benny Andersson; Björn Ulvaeus	Carlin	5:16
15.	"Walk Beside Me"	Robert John "Mutt" Lange	McMahon; Nesbitt	4:15
16.	"The Hills of Ireland"	Traditional (arranged by Gavin Murphy and Máiréad Nesbitt)	Nesbitt	3:12

Bonus tracks on special edition
No.	Title	Writer(s)	Performer(s)	Length
17.	"Skylands"	Bernd Wendlandt; William Andrews	Carlin; McFadden; McMahon; Nesbitt	3:34
18.	"Christmas Secrets" (Oonagh featuring Celtic Woman)	Enya; Nicky Ryan; Roma Ryan	Carlin; McFadden; McMahon; Nesbitt	3:38

Bonus tracks on German edition
No.	Title	Writer(s)	Performer(s)	Length
17.	"Skylands"	Bernd Wendlandt; William Andrews	Carlin; McFadden; McMahon; Nesbitt	3:34
18.	"O! Tannenbaum" (Live from Dublin)	Traditional (arranged by David Downes)	Lisa Lambe, McFadden, Ní Mhaolchatha	3:48
19.	"Silent Night" (from the album Home for Christmas)	Traditional (arranged by David Downes)	Ní Mhaolchatha	3:38

DVD and Blu-ray
No.	Title	Writer(s)	Performer(s)	Length
1.	"Destiny / When You Go"	Gavin Murphy; Bernd Wendlandt; William Andrews	Carlin; McFadden; McMahon; Nesbitt
2.	"Siúil a Rún"	Traditional (arranged by David Downes)	Carlin; McFadden; McMahon; Nesbitt
3.	"Ride On"	Jimmy McCarthy	Carlin; McMahon; Nesbitt
4.	"The Whole of the Moon"	Mike Scott	McFadden; Nesbitt
5.	"The Hills of Ireland"	Traditional (arranged by Gavin Murphy and Máiréad Nesbitt)	Nesbitt
6.	"You Raise Me Up"	Brendan Graham; Rolf Løvland	Carlin; McFadden; McMahon; Nesbitt
7.	"Sí do Mhaimeo Í"	Traditional (arranged by David Downes and Méav Ní Mhaolchatha)	Ní Mhaolchatha; Nesbitt
8.	"How Can I Keep from Singing"	Robert Lowry	McMahon
9.	"Skyrim Theme (Dragonborn)"	Jeremy Soule (Irish Gaelic lyrics by Gavin Murphy)	Nesbitt
10.	"My Land"	Brendan Graham; Rolf Løvland; Alana Graham	Carlin; McFadden; McMahon; Nesbitt
11.	"Bean Pháidín"	Traditional (arranged by Gavin Murphy)	Carlin; McFadden; McMahon; Nesbitt
12.	"I See Fire"	Ed Sheeran	Carlin
13.	"Isle of Innisfree"	Dick Farrelly	Rebecca Winckworth
14.	"Tír na nÓg" (featuring Oonagh)	Hartmut Krech; Mark Nissen; Johannes Braun; Lukas Hainer	Carlin; McFadden; McMahon; Nesbitt
15.	"Sometimes a Prayer Will Do"	Brendan Graham; Rolf Løvland	McFadden
16.	"Amazing Grace"	Traditional (arranged by David Downes)	Carlin; McFadden; McMahon
17.	"Oró Sé Do Bheatha 'Bhaile"	Traditional (arranged by Gavin Murphy and Méav Ní Mhaolchatha)	Ní Mhaolchatha; Carlin; McFadden; McMahon; Nesbitt
18.	"Like an Angel Passing Through My Room"	Benny Andersson; Björn Ulvaeus	Carlin
19.	"Walk Beside Me"	Robert John "Mutt" Lange	Carlin; McFadden; McMahon; Nesbitt
20.	"The Butterfly"	Traditional (arranged by Gavin Murphy, David Downes and Máiréad Nesbitt)	Nesbitt
21.	"Westering Home"	Traditional (arranged by Gavin Murphy)	Carlin; McFadden; McMahon; Nesbitt; Ní Mhaolchatha; Winckworth

== Charts ==
Destiny opened at No. 1 on the Billboard World Music chart, making it Celtic Woman's ninth consecutive album to debut at No. 1. The album spent sixty-four weeks on the Billboard World Music chart, including a total of eleven weeks at the No. 1 spot. The album remained in the chart's top-ten list for forty-one consecutive weeks and forty-eight weeks in total. The album reached No. 60 on the US Billboard 200 chart.

Chart (2016)	Peak position
Australian Albums (ARIA)	86
Austrian Albums (Ö3 Austria)	70
Belgian Albums (Ultratop Flanders)	132
Dutch Albums (Album Top 100)	95
German Albums (Offizielle Top 100)	41
Swiss Albums (Schweizer Hitparade)	95
US Billboard 200	60
US World Albums (Billboard)	1
