= The Magic of Christmas (Celtic Woman album) =

Studio album by Celtic Woman
- Released: 25 October 2019 (United States); 8 November 2019 (international)
- Recorded: Summer 2019
- Studio: Windmill Lane Recording Studios, Dublin, Ireland
- Genre: Celtic, new-age, classical, Christmas
- Length: 53:53
- Language: English, Irish, Latin, Spanish
- Label: Manhattan Records, Universal Music Group
- Producer: Gavin Murphy

Celtic Woman chronology
Ancient Land (2018)	The Magic of Christmas (2019)	Celebration: 15 Years of Music and Magic (2020)

Celtic Woman: The Magic of Christmas, or simply The Magic of Christmas, is the thirteenth studio album, and eighth Christmas-themed, released by the group Celtic Woman.

The Magic of Christmas features the same four performers from the group's previous studio album, Ancient Land; lead vocalists Mairéad Carlin (in her final appearance on a Celtic Woman album), Éabha McMahon (in her final appearance as a member of Celtic Woman), Megan Walsh, and instrumentalist Tara McNeill. It is also the group's first original Christmas-themed studio album since 2012's Home for Christmas.

== Track listing ==
No.	Title	Performer(s)	Length
1.	"We Wish You a Merry Christmas"	Mairéad Carlin, Éabha McMahon, Tara McNeill, Megan Walsh	3:26
2.	"Angels We Have Heard on High"	Carlin, McMahon, McNeill, Walsh	4:34
3.	"Do You Hear What I Hear?"	Walsh	3:53
4.	"Deck the Halls"	Carlin, McMahon, McNeill, Walsh	2:26
5.	"O Come, O Come Emmanuel"	Carlin	4:09
6.	"Amid the Falling Snow"	Carlin, McMahon, McNeill, Walsh	3:43
7.	"O Holy Night"	Carlin, McMahon, McNeill, Walsh	4:20
8.	"Sleigh Ride"	Carlin, McMahon, McNeill, Walsh	3:34
9.	"Greensleeves"	McNeill	3:36
10.	"Dia do Bheatha"	McMahon	3:39
11.	"Carol of the Bells"	Carlin, McMahon, McNeill, Walsh	3:24
12.	"Wexford Carol"	Carlin, McMahon, McNeill, Walsh	3:00
13.	"Silent Night"	McNeill	1:58
14.	"Auld Lang Syne"	Carlin, McMahon, McNeill, Walsh	4:39
15.	"Feliz Navidad"	Carlin, McMahon, McNeill, Walsh	3:32
Total length:			53:53

== Personnel ==
Per the liner notes:

Featured performers

- Mairéad Carlin – vocals
- Éabha McMahon – vocals
- Tara McNeill – fiddle
- Megan Walsh – vocals

Musicians

- Gavin Murphy – piano, celesta
- Kieran Leonard – drums, bodhrán, percussion
- Darragh Murphy – uilleann pipes, whistle
- Bill Shanley – guitar
- John Hunt – bagpipes

FILMharmonic Orchestra, Prague

- Adam Klemens – conductor

Kühn Mixed Choir

- Lenka Navrátilová – choir arranger

Production

- Gavin Murphy – producer, arrangements, orchestrations
- Méav Ní Mhaolchatha – vocal director
- Michael Manning – recording engineer
- Chris O'Brien – mixing engineer
- Graham Murphy – mixing
- Andrew Walter – mastering engineer
- Vitel Kral – engineer
- Michal Hradiský – assistant recording engineer

== Charts ==
Chart (2018–19)	Peak position
US World Albums (Billboard)	5
