= Believe (Celtic Woman album) =

Studio album by Celtic Woman
- Released: 25 May 2011 (Japan); 24 January 2012 (worldwide); 27 April 2012 (Australia)
- Recorded: 2010–2011
- Venues: Fox Theater, Atlanta, Georgia, United States
- Studios: Windmill Lane Studio 1 and RTÉ STUDIOTWO, Dublin, Ireland
- Genres: Celtic, new-age, classical, vocal
- Length: 1:05:37
- Languages: English, Irish, Latin
- Label: Manhattan
- Producer: David Downes

Celtic Woman chronology
Lullaby (2011)	Believe (2011)	Home for Christmas (2012)

Believe is the seventh studio album released by the group Celtic Woman.

The album was released in two versions: the first a compilation of earlier songs packaged with a new song, "Princess Toyotomi", released on 25 May 2011 in Japan to promote the release of the titular film in which said track served as the theme song, the other a studio album released internationally on 24 January 2012, featuring new music. Vocalists Chloë Agnew, Lisa Kelly, Lisa Lambe, and fiddler Máiréad Nesbitt appear on both versions, while the Japanese version features former members Órla Fallon, Lynn Hilary, Méav Ní Mhaolchatha, Alex Sharpe, and Hayley Westenra.

== Track listing ==
=== International version ===
No.	Title	Performer(s)	Length
1.	"Awakening"	Chloë Agnew, Lisa Kelly, Lisa Lambe, Máiréad Nesbitt	5:15
2.	"Nocturne"	Agnew, Nesbitt	3:33
3.	"Sailing"	Agnew, Kelly, Lambe, Nesbitt	4:09
4.	"The Foxhunter"	Nesbitt	3:20
5.	"The Water Is Wide"	Kelly, Nesbitt	3:31
6.	"Bridge Over Troubled Water"	Agnew, Kelly, Lambe, Gwinnett Young Singers	4:00
7.	"Black Is the Colour"	Lambe	3:40
8.	"Follow On"	Kelly	4:48
9.	"Ave Maria"	Agnew	4:18
10.	"Téir Abhaile Riú"	Agnew, Kelly, Lambe, Nesbitt	4:00
11.	"You'll Never Walk Alone"	Agnew, Kelly, Lambe, Nesbitt	4:00
12.	"A Spaceman Came Travelling"	Lambe	3:48
13.	"Songs from the Heart (Walking the Night / The World Falls Away)"	Agnew, Kelly, Lambe	6:43
14.	"A Woman's Heart"	Agnew, Kelly, Lambe	4:28
15.	"The Parting Glass"	Agnew, Kelly, Lambe, Nesbitt	4:13
Total length:			59:46

Bonus tracks on Japanese edition
No.	Title	Performer(s)	Length
16.	"Smile"	Agnew, Kelly, Lambe, Nesbitt	2:05
17.	"Green Grow the Rushes" (Live)	Agnew, Kelly	3:46
Total length:			1:05:37

Bonus tracks on German edition
No.	Title	Performer(s)	Length
15.	"I'm Counting on You" (featuring Chris de Burgh)	Agnew, Lambe, Susan McFadden, Nesbitt	4:38
16.	"Dúlaman"	Lambe	2:55
17.	"Tears in Heaven"	Agnew	4:17
Total length:			1:07:23

=== Japanese version ===
No.	Title	Performer(s)	Length
1.	"Princess Toyotomi"	Chloë Agnew, Lisa Kelly, Lisa Lambe, Máiréad Nesbitt	4:24
2.	"You Raise Me Up"	Agnew, Órla Fallon, Kelly, Nesbitt, Méav Ní Mhaolchatha	4:33
3.	"Brahms' Lullaby"	Agnew	2:18
4.	"Over the Rainbow" (from The Wizard of Oz)	Agnew, Fallon, Ní Mhaolchatha, Hayley Westenra	2:40
5.	"Beyond the Sea" (from Finding Nemo)	Agnew, Fallon, Kelly, Nesbitt, Ní Mhaolchatha, Westenra	3:22
6.	"When You Wish Upon a Star" (from Pinocchio)	Kelly, Nesbitt	3:18
7.	"When You Believe" (from The Prince of Egypt)	Agnew	4:31
8.	"Goodnight My Angel"	Agnew, Lynn Hilary, Kelly	3:15
9.	"Ave Maria"	Agnew	2:55
10.	"The Sky and the Dawn and the Sun"	Agnew, Fallon, Kelly, Nesbitt, Ní Mhaolchatha, Westenra	5:22
11.	"Danny Boy"	Ní Mhaolchatha	3:27
12.	"Walking in the Air" (from The Snowman)	Agnew	3:31
13.	"Somewhere" (from West Side Story)	Agnew, Fallon, Kelly, Ní Mhaolchatha	2:15
14.	"Amazing Grace"	Agnew, Hilary, Kelly, Nesbitt, Alex Sharpe	5:00
15.	"Princess Toyotomi (Movie Theme)" (Bonus track)	Agnew, Kelly, Lambe, Nesbitt	4:34
Total length:			55:25

== PBS special and DVD release background ==
A concert special of the same title was recorded live at the Fox Theater in Atlanta, Georgia, United States on 6 and 7 September 2011 to promote and accompany the international release of the album. The concert featured lead vocalists Chloë Agnew, Lisa Kelly, Lisa Lambe and fiddler Máiréad Nesbitt with the Aontas Choral Ensemble and the Celtic Woman band and orchestra led by musical director and pianist David Downes, as well as the Atlanta Pipe Band and the Gwinnett Young Singers. The concert was broadcast on PBS stations across the United States in December 2011 and released on DVD in March 2012.

=== DVD track listing ===
No.	Title	Performer(s)	Length
1.	"Awakening"	Chloë Agnew, Lisa Kelly, Lisa Lambe, Máiréad Nesbitt	5:11
2.	"Follow On"	Kelly	4:48
3.	"The Foxhunter"	Nesbitt	3:33
4.	"Nocturne"	Agnew, Nesbitt	3:33
5.	"Sailing"	Agnew, Kelly, Lambe, Nesbitt, Atlanta Pipe Band	4:09
6.	"Bridge Over Troubled Water"	Agnew, Kelly, Lambe, Gwinnett Young Singers	4:18
7.	"Black Is the Colour"	Lambe	3:40
8.	"The World Falls Away"	Agnew, Kelly, Lambe	3:22
9.	"My Heart Was Home Again"	Kelly, Lambe	4:29
10.	"A Tribute to Broadway" ("I Dreamed a Dream" / "Circle of Life")	Agnew, Kelly, Lambe	5:33
11.	"Téir Abhaile Riú"	Agnew, Kelly, Lambe, Nesbitt	4:33
12.	"A Woman's Heart"	Agnew, Kelly, Lambe	4:34
13.	"The Water is Wide"	Kelly, Nesbitt	3:27
14.	"Green Grow the Rushes"	Agnew, Kelly	3:41
15.	"You'll Never Walk Alone"	Agnew, Kelly, Lambe, Nesbitt, Gwinnett Young Singers	4:16
16.	"Smile"	Agnew, Kelly, Lambe, Nesbitt	2:26
17.	"Walking the Night"	Agnew, Lambe	3:21
18.	"A Spaceman Came Travelling"	Lambe	4:10
19.	"Ave Maria"	Agnew, Gwinnett Young Singers	4:39
20.	"Mná na hÉireann"	Nesbitt	3:34
21.	"The Parting Glass"	Agnew, Kelly, Lambe, Nesbitt, Atlanta Pipe Band	4:22

== Personnel ==
Note: For international version only.

Per the liner notes:
Featured performers
Celtic Woman

- Chloë Agnew – vocals
- Lisa Kelly – vocals
- Lisa Lambe – vocals
- Máiréad Nesbitt – fiddle

Other performers

- Bagad de Lann-Bihoué
- Gwinnett Young Singers

Band

- Ewan Cowley – electric and acoustic guitar, bouzouki
- Eoghan O'Neill – bass guitar
- Russell Powell - guitar
- Tommy Martin – uilleann pipes, whistles
- Ray Fean – drums, percussion, bodhrán
- Anthony Byrne – bagpipes
- Andrew Boland – contra pièna-flörten
- David Downes – grand piano, keyboards, whistles, percussion, backing vocals

The Irish Film Orchestra

- Caitríona Walsh – orchestra contractor
- David Downes – conductor, orchestrations, choral arrangements
- Alan Smale – concertmaster
- Martin Johnston – solo cello
- Gerald Peregrine – solo cello
- Nick Ingham – additional orchestrations

Aontas Choral Ensemble

- Rosemary Collier – choral director

Production

- Produced and arranged by David Downes
- Engineered and mixed by Andrew Boland
- Additional engineering by David Downes
- Recorded at Windmill Lane Studio 1 and RTÉ STUDIOTWO, Dublin, Ireland
- Mixed at STUDIOTWO, Dublin
- Mastered by Vlado Meller at Masterdisk, New York, United States

== Charts ==
Note: For international version only.

Chart (2012)	Peak position
Austrian Albums (Ö3 Austria)	32
Belgian Albums (Ultratop Flanders)	54
Dutch Albums (Album Top 100)	23
German Albums (Offizielle Top 100)	11
Swiss Albums (Schweizer Hitparade)	10
US Billboard 200	13
US World Albums (Billboard)	1

=== Certifications ===
Region	Certification	Certified units/sales
Australia (ARIA)	Gold	7,500^{^}
^{^} Shipments figures based on certification alone.
