= The Best of Christmas =

Celtic Woman: The Best of Christmas

Compilation album by Celtic Woman
- Released: 24 November 2017
- Recorded: 2006–2016
- Genre: Celtic, new-age, classical, Christmas
- Length: 1:08:38
- Language: English, Irish
- Label: Manhattan Records
- Producer: Gavin Murphy, David Downes

Celtic Woman chronology
Voices of Angels (2016)	Celtic Woman: The Best of Christmas (2017)	Homecoming – Live from Ireland (2018)

The Best of Christmas is a Christmas-themed compilation album released by the group Celtic Woman, and their seventh under that category overall.

Performers on The Best of Christmas are vocalists Chloë Agnew, Mairéad Carlin, Órla Fallon, Lisa Kelly, Lisa Lambe, Susan McFadden, Éabha McMahon, Méav Ní Mhaolchatha, and violinists Máiréad Nesbitt and Tara McNeill.

== Track listing ==
No.	Title	Performer(s)	Length
1.	"Ding! Dong! Merrily on High"	Chloë Agnew, Órla Fallon, Lisa Kelly, Máiréad Nesbitt, Méav Ní Mhaolchatha	2:47
2.	"Carol of the Bells"	Nesbitt	2:19
3.	"Joy to the World"	Máiréad Carlin, Susan McFadden, Éabha McMahon, Tara McNeill	3:29
4.	"We Three Kings"	Agnew, Lisa Lambe, Méav Ní Mhaolchatha	3:37
5.	"Have Yourself a Merry Little Christmas"	Agnew, Fallon, Kelly, Nesbitt, Ní Mhaolchatha	2:29
6.	"O Holy Night"	Agnew, Fallon, Kelly, Nesbitt, Ní Mhaolchatha	4:25
7.	"White Christmas"	Agnew, Kelly, Ní Mhaolchatha	3:21
8.	"Santa Claus is Coming to Town"	Agnew, Nesbitt	4:13
9.	"I'll Be Home for Christmas"	Lambe	4:12
10.	"Silent Night"	Carlin, McFadden, McMahon, McNeill	4:10
11.	"The Christmas Song"	Kelly	3:35
12.	"Let it Snow!"	Agnew, Fallon, Kelly, Nesbitt, Ní Mhaolchatha	2:30
13.	"Once in Royal David's City"	Carlin, McFadden, McMahon, McNeill	4:08
14.	"Away in a Manger"	Fallon	2:31
15.	"Winter Wonderland"	Agnew, Lambe, Nesbitt, Ní Mhaolchatha	2:51
16.	"Walking in the Air"	Agnew	3:27
17.	"O Come All Ye Faithful"	Agnew, Fallon, Kelly, Nesbitt, Ní Mhaolchatha	3:50
18.	"The Little Drummer Boy"	Agnew, Fallon	3:46
19.	"We Wish You a Merry Christmas"	Agnew, Lambe, Nesbitt, Ní Mhaolchatha	3:37
20.	"Auld Lang Syne"	Lambe	3:27
Total length:			1:08:38

Notes

- Tracks 1, 2, 5, 6, 7, 11, 12, 14, 17, and 18 were originally released on the album A Christmas Celebration.
- Track 16 was released on the album Lullaby as an edited version of the original track from the original Celtic Woman album.
- Tracks 4, 8, 9, 15, 19, and 20 were originally released on the album Home for Christmas.
- Tracks 3, 10, and 13 were originally released on the album Voices of Angels; however, they were not available on the digital release of said album.
- Tracks 1–2, 4–9, 11–12, and 14-20 were produced by David Downes.
- Tracks 3, 10, and 13 were produced by Gavin Murphy.

== Charts ==
Chart	Peak position
US World Albums (Billboard)	2
