= O Christmas Tree (album) =

Celtic Woman: O Christmas Tree

Live album / Video by Celtic Woman
- Released: October 21, 2014
- Recorded: 7 August 2013
- Venue: The Helix in Dublin
- Genre: Celtic, vocal, world, Christmas
- Length: 18:59
- Label: Manhattan Records, Universal Music Group

Celtic Woman chronology
| Emerald – Musical Gems (2014) | Celtic Woman: O Christmas Tree (2014) | Destiny (2015) |

Celtic Woman: O Christmas Tree is the sixth Christmas-themed album by Irish musical ensemble Celtic Woman. The tracks were taken from the concert DVD, Celtic Woman: Home for Christmas, at The Helix in Dublin. It was the group's first album to consist entirely of live tracks. The album features vocalists Lisa Lambe, Susan McFadden and Méav Ní Mhaolchatha, and violinist Mairead Nesbitt. In contrast to the Celtic Woman: Home for Christmas album, O Christmas Tree does not feature vocalist Chloë Agnew.

== Track listing ==
| No. | Title | Performer(s) | Length |
|---|---|---|---|
| 1. | "O Tannenbaum" | Lisa Lambe, Susan McFadden, Méav Ní Mhaolchatha | 4:00 |
| 2. | "It's Beginning To Look A Lot Like Christmas" | Lambe, McFadden, Ní Mhaolchatha | 2:50 |
| 3. | "The Light of Christmas Morn" | Lambe, Mairead Nesbitt, Ní Mhaolchatha | 4:06 |
| 4. | "It Came Upon A Midnight Clear" | McFadden | 4:00 |
| 5. | "Away In A Manger" | Lambe | 2:44 |
| 6. | "In The Bleak Midwinter" | Ní Mhaolchatha | 2:20 |
| Total length: | | | 18:59 |

== Personnel ==
Per the liner notes.

The Celtic Woman Band

- Ray Fean - drums & percussion
- Andy Reilly - percussion
- Tommy Martin - uilleann pipes
- Anthony Byrne - bagpipes

Aontas Philharmonic Choral Ensemble

- Paul McGough - choral contractor

Discovery Gospel Choir

- Róisín Dexter - director

Irish Film Orchestra

- Catriona Walsh - orchestral contractor

== Charts ==
| Chart (2014–18) | Peak position |
|---|---|
| US World Albums (Billboard) | 2 |
