= The Galway Shawl =

Irish folk song

"The Galway Shawl" is a traditional Irish folk song, concerning a rural courtship in the West of Ireland. The first known version was collected by Sam Henry from Bridget Kealey in Dungiven in 1936. The song has been popularly recorded by many ballad groups in Ireland and is now commonly adapted to a waltz time so that people can dance to it.

The plot takes place in May in Oranmore. The narrator sees a girl wearing a bonnet with ribbons and a Galway shawl around her shoulders. He and the girl go to her father's cottage. The girl tells him to play "The Foggy Dew" to please her father. The man plays some hornpipes and the girl sings them as she cries tears of joy. The song ends as the narrator bids the girl farewell as he's bound for County Donegal.

== Recordings ==
- Trail West on their new album, “Countless Isles and Endless Miles”
- Margaret Barry on her album Portraits: I Sang Through the Fairs
- Four to the Bar on their live album Craic on the Road, in a medley with "The Black Velvet Band" and "The Wild Rover".
- Christie Hennessey on The Green Album, released in 1973
- The Dubliners on their album 30 Years A-Greying
- Ryan's Fancy on their album Irish Love Songs.
- Patrick Street on their album On the Fly.
- Poxy Boggards on their 2004 album Liver, Let Die.
- Caitlin Murtagh on her 2003 album I Love You Still
- Cerys Matthews in 2008 (YouTube)
- Daniel O'Donnell 2011 Moon Over Ireland album
- Finbar Furey in 2017 on "Paddy Dear".
- Philip Noone as a 2018 single on his album God be with the days.
- Lisa O'Neill on her 2018 album Heard a Long Gone Song.
- Daoirí Farrell on his 2019 album A Lifetime of Happiness
- Vinnie Jones in 2019 on The X Factor: Celebrity.
- Dervish (with guest vocalist Steve Earle) on their 2019 album The Great Irish Songbook.
- Dan McCabe in 2020 on YouTube and Facebook.
- Celtic Woman as part of their 2021 album Postcards from Ireland
- Pub Runners in 2024 on YouTube ""

== Sounds Samples ==
- The Galway Shawl by Ryan's Fancy
