= Ancient Land =

Studio album by Celtic Woman
- Released: 26 October 2018
- Recorded: July 2018
- Studio: Real World Studios, London, United Kingdom
- Genre: Celtic, world, folk, vocal
- Length: 64:28; 99:13 (digital deluxe edition)
- Label: Manhattan Records, Universal Music Group
- Producer: Gavin Murphy

Celtic Woman chronology
Homecoming – Live from Ireland (2018)	Ancient Land (2018)	The Magic of Christmas (2019)

Ancient Land is the twelfth studio album and eleventh home video release by the group Celtic Woman.

== Background ==
The album was recorded at Real World Studios, Herbert Place Studios, Beechpark Studios, and Jam Studios in London, United Kingdom in July 2018. The digital album was released on 28 September 2018 and the CD was released on 26 October 2018, with a digital deluxe edition following on 6 September 2019.

The album is produced, arranged, and orchestrated by Gavin Murphy and includes a mixture of traditional Irish songs and contemporary arrangements. The lead performers are vocalists Mairéad Carlin, Éabha McMahon, and Megan Walsh as well as instrumentalist Tara McNeill. Ancient Land was Walsh's studio debut and live debut with the group.

An accompanying concert special of the same title was recorded live outside of Johnstown Castle in County Wexford, Ireland on 13 and 14 September 2018 in front of an invited audience. It was the group's first outdoor special since Songs from the Heart was recorded nine years prior. The special began airing on PBS in November 2018, and was released on DVD and Blu-ray on 25 January 2019.

Both the album and concert special were both dedicated to Dave Kavanagh, one of the founders of Celtic Woman, who died on 6 April 2018, and was, according to the group, "our founder, our leader, our guiding light. Sé mo laoch mo ghile mear."

== Track listing ==
CD
No.	Title	Performer(s)	Length
1.	"Ancient Land"	Mairéad Carlin, Éabha McMahon, Tara McNeill, Megan Walsh	2:43
2.	"Homeland"	Carlin, McMahon, McNeill, Walsh	4:19
3.	"Moorlough Shore"	McMahon	4:05
4.	"Follow Me"	Carlin, McMahon, McNeill, Walsh	3:38
5.	"County Down"	Carlin	3:43
6.	"Love and Honour"	McNeill	4:04
7.	"Mná na hÉireann (Women of Ireland)"	Carlin, McMahon, McNeill, Walsh	4:00
8.	"Sive"	Carlin, McMahon, McNeill, Walsh	3:10
9.	"Shenandoah"	Walsh	4:07
10.	"Long Journey Home"	Carlin, McMahon, McNeill, Walsh	3:13
11.	"Tara's Tunes"	McNeill	4:14
12.	"Ae Fond Kiss"	Carlin	3:59
13.	"Faith's Song"	Walsh	4:03
14.	"Garden of Eden"	McMahon	3:23
15.	"Be Still"	Carlin, McMahon, Walsh	1:35
16.	"Going Home" (from Gods and Generals)	Carlin, McMahon, McNeill, Walsh	4:02
17.	"The Enchanted Way"	McNeill	2:51
18.	"Ballroom of Romance"	Carlin, McMahon, McNeill, Walsh	3:15
Total length:			64:28

Bonus tracks on digital deluxe edition
No.	Title	Performer(s)	Length
19.	"Newgrange"	Carlin	3:46
20.	"Orinoco Flow"	Carlin, McMahon, McNeill, Walsh	3:52
21.	"Fields of Gold"	Walsh	3:36
22.	"Bean Pháidín"	Carlin, McMahon, McNeill, Walsh	3:17
23.	"Over the Rainbow"	Carlin, Walsh	3:24
24.	"Siúil a Rúin"	McMahon, McNeill	3:15
25.	"Amazing Grace"	Carlin, McMahon, McNeill, Walsh	5:33
26.	"Danny Boy"	Carlin, McMahon, McNeill, Walsh	3:32
27.	"The Parting Glass"	Carlin, McMahon, McNeill, Walsh	4:31
Total length:			99:13

Notes

- Tracks 17 and 18 were not available on the digital album, only on the physical CD and digital deluxe edition.
- Tracks 1, 4, 6, 15, 17 and 18 were original tracks written by Gavin Murphy.
- Tracks 4 and 18 were co-written by Méav Ní Mhaolchatha.
- Track 14 was written by Éabha McMahon and Ciarán Byrne.
- Track 15 was co-written by Johnny B. Broderick.

DVD and Blu-ray
No.	Title	Performer(s)	Length
1.	"Ancient Land"	Carlin, McMahon, McNeill, Walsh
2.	"Homeland"	Carlin, McMahon, McNeill, Walsh
3.	"Moorlough Shore"	McMahon, New Ross & District Pipe Band drum corps
4.	"Ae Fond Kiss"	Carlin
5.	"Amazing Grace"	Carlin, McMahon, McNeill, Walsh, Johnstown Voices Choir
6.	"Long Journey Home"	Carlin, McMahon, McNeill, Walsh
7.	"Sive"	Carlin, McMahon, McNeill, Walsh
8.	"Shenandoah"	Walsh
9.	"County Down"	Carlin
10.	"Love and Honour"	McNeill
11.	"Ballroom of Romance"	Carlin, McMahon, McNeill, Walsh
12.	"Follow Me"	Carlin, McMahon, McNeill, Walsh
13.	"Mná na hÉireann (Women of Ireland)"	Carlin, McMahon, McNeill, Walsh, Johnstown Voices Choir
14.	"Over the Rainbow"	Carlin, Walsh
15.	"Tara's Tunes"	McNeill
16.	"Danny Boy"	Carlin, McMahon, McNeill, Walsh
17.	"Garden of Eden"	McMahon
18.	"Faith's Song"	Walsh, Johnstown Voices Choir
19.	"Siúil a Rúin"	McMahon, McNeill
20.	"Be Still"	Carlin, McMahon, Walsh, Johnstown Voices Choir
21.	"Going Home"	Carlin, McMahon, McNeill, Walsh, Johnstown Voices Choir, New Ross & District Pipe Band
22.	"The Enchanted Way"	McNeill
23.	"The Parting Glass"	Carlin, McMahon, McNeill, Walsh, Johnstown Voices Choir, New Ross & District Pipe Band

== Personnel ==
Per the liner notes:

Celtic Woman

- Mairéad Carlin – vocals
- Éabha McMahon – vocals, tin whistle
- Tara McNeill – fiddle, harp
- Megan Walsh – vocals

Musicians

- Bill Shanley – guitars
- James Blennerhassett – bass guitar, double bass
- Paul Clarvis – drums, percussion
- Noel Eccles – percussion
- Liam Bradley – drums
- Alex Vann – mandolin bouzouki
- John O'Brien – uilleann pipes, whistles
- Darragh Murphy – uilleann pipes, whistles
- Cormac DeBarra – Irish harp
- Peter Browne – accordion
- Declan Aungier – accordion
- Anthony Byrne – bagpipes
- Glenn Murphy – background vocals
- Ronan Scolard – background vocals
- Simon Morgan – background vocals
- Paul McGough – background vocals
- Daryn Crosbie – tap dancer
- Alan McGrath – tap dancer
- Gerald Peregrine – solo cello
- Gavin Murphy – piano, keyboards, programming, string arrangements

The Orchestra of Ireland

- Joe Csibi – orchestra contractor
- Ken Rice – leader
- Lynda O'Connor – violin
- Lydia J. Clarke – violin
- Anita Vedres – violin
- Cillian Brackin – violin
- Sylvia Roberts – violin
- Jane Hackett – violin
- Emily Thyne – violin
- Aoife Durnin – violin
- Aoife Dowdall – violin
- Paul O'Hanlon – violin
- Rachel Grimes – violin
- Leanne Melchoir – viola
- Adele Johnson – viola
- Karen Dervan – viola
- Carla Vedres – viola
- Anthony Mulholland – viola
- Gerald Peregrine – cello
- Martin Johnson – cello
- Una Ni Chanainn – cello
- Jane Huges – cello
- Anna Marcossi – cello

== Charts ==
Chart (2018–19)	Peak position
Irish Albums (IRMA)	13
Swiss Albums (Schweizer Hitparade)	100
US World Albums (Billboard)	3
