= Tara McNeill =

Irish singer and musician

Tara McNeill Tara Nic Néill
- Born: Antrim, Northern Ireland
- Genres: Celtic; acoustic; classical
- Occupations: Singer, Musician
- Instruments: Vocals; Violin; Harp
- Years active: 2011–present
- Website: www.taramcneill.com

Tara McNeill (pronounced TAR-a) is an Irish violinist, harpist, and soprano singer from Antrim, Northern Ireland.

== Early life and career ==
McNeill comes from a family that is musically inclined. All her siblings play musical instruments. At St. Joseph's Primary School in Antrim, McNeill showed potential as a musician. McNeill took to singing at a young age. By age 7, she was learning to play piano and by age 8, she was playing the violin.

McNeill was part of the junior and senior Ulster / North Eastern Education and Library Board (NEELB) Youth Orchestra, performing with them for 7 years and leading the senior orchestra at the age of 17.

She was selected as Head Girl in St. Louis Grammar School, Ballymena in 2008–2009.

She earned a Bachelor of Arts in Music Teaching and Performance, with a focus on violin, from the Royal Irish Academy of Music. There, she studied under Michael D’Arcy. She graduated with First class honours in June 2009 with the highest marks in her year. McNeill performs on a Roger Hansell violin.

== Musical career ==
McNeill toured with the Irish choral ensemble Anúna as both a solo violinist and as a singer from 2011 to 2016. She also played violin on the Anúna album Illumination released in 2012.

In April 2013, McNeill performed the Irish premiere of Finzi's Violin Concerto in the National Concert Hall, Dublin, Ireland.

In 2014, McNeill was a lead performer in the show Ireland Calling as a violinist, harpist, and singer. The show appeared in Copenhagen, Denmark and Dublin, Ireland in 2014.

=== Celtic Woman ===
In August 2015, McNeill played the harp as part of the orchestra in Celtic Woman: Destiny, a DVD and PBS TV special filmed in the Round Room at the Mansion House, Dublin, Ireland.

On 7 August 2016, McNeill was announced as the newest principal member of the all-female Irish musical ensemble Celtic Woman. McNeill took over for founding and long-time Celtic Woman violinist Mairead Nesbitt, who took leave from the group to pursue her own projects. McNeill joined Mairead Carlin as one of the only two principal performers of Celtic Woman to come from Northern Ireland so far.

On 15 August 2016, McNeill began recording in the studio for Celtic Woman. McNeill's first live concert with Celtic Woman was on 16 September 2016, in Johannesburg, South Africa. Her first album as an official member of Celtic Woman was Celtic Woman: Voices of Angels.

=== Other career highlights ===
McNeill has toured in many countries and has performed with well-known artists such as Barry Douglas, Bono, Il Divo, Julie Feeney, Josh Groban, and Damien Rice. She has performed at prestigious venues, including Carnegie Hall, the Oriental Arts Center, and the National Centre for the Performing Arts.

Prior to joining Celtic Woman, McNeill taught violin in Mount Anville Junior School, Dublin, teaching about 50 students.

== Personal life ==
McNeill married American pianist Alexander "Alex" Bernstein in January 2018.

== Discography ==
With Celtic Woman

- Celtic Woman: Voices of Angels (2016)
- Celtic Woman: The Best of Christmas (2017)
- Celtic Woman: Homecoming Live from Ireland (2018)
- Celtic Woman: Ancient Land (2018)
- Celtic Woman: The Magic of Christmas (2019)
- Celtic Woman: Celebration-15 Years of Music and Magic (2020)
- Celtic Woman: Postcards from Ireland (2021)
- Celtic Woman: Christmas Cards From Ireland (2022)
- Celtic Woman: 20 (2024)

Solo

- Across the Atlantic (2023)

== Awards ==
- Leo Gibney Award for Chamber Music (RIAM)
- 2009: Ballymena Music Festival's prestigious Young Instrumentalist Award
- 2010: Holywood Music Festival's Sinfonietta Cup
- 2010: Holywood Music Festival's d’Arcy Cup and Award
- 2010: Holywood Music Festival's Ulster Bank Festival Gala Cup
- 2012: Inaugural Flax Trust Classics £5000 bursary
- 2012: George & Angela Moore Flax Trust Classics Audience Award
- 2016: Grammy Award nominee for Best World Music album at the 59th Grammy Awards (for Destiny, with Celtic Woman)
