= Postcards from Ireland =

Studio album by Celtic Woman
- Released: 29 October 2021
- Recorded: June–July 2021
- Studios: Camden Recording Studios and Windmill Lane Recording Studios, Dublin, Ireland
- Genres: Celtic, new-age, classical crossover, vocal
- Length: 50:54
- Languages: English, Irish, Quenya
- Labels: Manhattan Records, Universal Music Group
- Producer: Daragh O'Toole

Celtic Woman chronology
Celebration: 15 Years of Music and Magic (2020)	Postcards from Ireland (2021)	Christmas Cards From Ireland (2022)

Postcards from Ireland is the fourteenth studio album released by the group Celtic Woman.

== Background ==
On 20 April 2021, Celtic Woman announced the Postcards from Ireland tour, with Cork-born singer Muirgen O'Mahony replacing former member Mairéad Carlin who left the group in January 2021 to pursue solo projects.

On 10 September, "The Dawning of the Day" was released as the first single from the album, accompanied by a lyric video. On 8 October, "Mise Éire" was released as the second single from the album, also with a lyric video. The album was released on 29 October, and an accompanying music video for "Wild Mountain Thyme" was released on the same day.

Postcards from Ireland features vocalists Chloë Agnew, O'Mahony, Megan Walsh and instrumentalist Tara McNeill. British folk group the Longest Johns make a guest appearance on the track "Beeswing", while former member Susan McFadden returned to the group as a guest performer on the track "May it Be".

== Track listing ==
Note: All songs arranged, orchestrated and produced by Daragh O'Toole.

CD
No.	Title	Performer(s)	Length
1.	"The Dawning of the Day"	Chloë Agnew, Tara McNeill, Muirgen O'Mahony, Megan Walsh	3:54
2.	"Bonny Portmore"	Walsh	4:00
3.	"Mise Éire"	Agnew, McNeill, O'Mahony, Walsh	3:52
4.	"Wild Mountain Thyme"	Agnew, McNeill, O'Mahony, Walsh	3:56
5.	"Beeswing" (featuring the Longest Johns)	Agnew, McNeill, O'Mahony, Walsh	4:48
6.	"Down by the Salley Gardens"	O'Mahony	4:10
7.	"Where Sheep May Safely Graze"	McNeill	3:58
8.	"Angel"	Agnew	4:35
9.	"The Lakes of Pontchartrain"	McNeill, Walsh	3:56
10.	"May It Be"	Susan McFadden	3:11
11.	"The Calm of the Day / The Banshee"	McNeill	2:57
12.	"The Galway Shawl"	Agnew, McNeill, O'Mahony, Walsh	4:04
13.	"Black Is the Colour" (2021 Version)	Agnew, McNeill, O'Mahony, Walsh	3:33
Total length:			50:54

== PBS special and DVD release background ==
A television special of the same title was broadcast on PBS stations across the United States and Canada in November 2021. Directed by Irish filmmaker Donal Moloney and produced by Windmill Lane Pictures, the special consists of a subset of sixteen music videos filmed in different locations across the Republic of Ireland and Northern Ireland in mid-2021.

A gift set containing a CD, DVD and a set of postcards was made available for donations made through local stations to support airings of the special. The DVD was later made available through the official PBS website, and was released generally on 21 January 2022.

=== DVD track listing ===
No.	Title	Performer(s)	Length
1.	"The Dawning of the Day"	Chloë Agnew, Tara McNeill, Muirgen O'Mahony, Megan Walsh
2.	"Bonny Portmore"	Walsh
3.	"Where Sheep May Safely Graze"	McNeill
4.	"Beeswing" (featuring the Longest Johns)	Agnew, McNeill, O'Mahony, Walsh
5.	"The Lakes of Pontchartrain"	McNeill, Walsh
6.	"Down by the Salley Gardens"	O'Mahony
7.	"Mise Éire"	Agnew, McNeill, O'Mahony, Walsh
8.	"Angel"	Agnew
9.	"The Galway Shawl"	Agnew, McNeill, O'Mahony, Walsh
10.	"May It Be"	Susan McFadden
11.	"Danny Boy" (arranged by Gavin Murphy)	Agnew, McNeill, O'Mahony, Walsh
12.	"Wild Mountain Thyme"	Agnew, McNeill, O'Mahony, Walsh
13.	"Amazing Grace" (arranged by Gavin Murphy)	Agnew, McFadden, McNeill, Walsh
14.	"Black Is the Colour"	Agnew, McNeill, O'Mahony, Walsh
15.	"The Calm of the Day / The Banshee"	McNeill
16.	"The Parting Glass" (arranged by Gavin Murphy)	Agnew, McNeill, O'Mahony, Walsh

== Personnel ==
Per the liner notes:

=== Celtic Woman ===
- Chloë Agnew - vocals
- Susan McFadden - vocals
- Tara McNeill - fiddle, harp
- Megan Walsh - vocals
- Muirgen O'Mahony - vocals

=== Band ===
- Daragh O'Toole - piano, keyboards
- Kieran Leonard - drums, bodhrán drum, percussion
- Caitríona Frost - percussion
- Darragh Murphy - whistles, uilleann pipes
- John Hunt - bagpipes
- Anthony Byrne - bagpipes
- Johnny Boyle - drums, percussion
- Brian Murphy - guitar, mandolin, banjo

=== The Orchestra of Ireland ===
- Jonathan Ford - orchestra contractor
- Daragh O'Toole - orchestra leader
- David Brophy - music director, conductor

=== Celtic Voices Choir ===
- Paul McGough - choral contractor

=== Production ===
- Daragh O'Toole - producer, recording arranger
- Michael Manning - studio engineer
- Simon Gibson - mastering engineer
- Ger McDonnell - studio mixing

The Longest Johns appear courtesy of Decca Records

== Charts ==
Chart performance for Postcards from Ireland
Chart (2021)	Peak position
Swiss Albums (Schweizer Hitparade)	56
UK Folk Albums (Official Charts)	28
