= Lowlands (album) =

Studio album by Susan McKeown
- Released: September 12, 2000
- Recorded: 1999–2000
- Studio: Mission Sound (Brooklyn, New York)
- Genre: Folk
- Length: 52:09
- Label: Green Linnet
- Producer: Jamshied Sharifi; Susan McKeown; Donogh Hennessy

Susan McKeown chronology
Mother (1999)	Lowlands (2000)	A Winter Talisman (2001)

Professional ratings
Review scores
Source	Rating
AllMusic	5/5 stars
Encyclopedia of Popular Music	4/5 stars

Lowlands is an album by Irish folk singer Susan McKeown. The album was released on September 26, 2000, by Celtic music label Green Linnet Records. Billed as the singers' "largest musical project to date," Lowlandsfeatures over twenty-five guest musicians from Ireland, England, the United States, Iceland, Norway, Mali, India, and China. Produced by McKeown and Tony Award-winning composer Jamshied Sharifi, the wide array of guest artists includes Malian griot Mamadou Diabaté, Scottish cellist Johnny Cunningham, American flutist Joanie Madden, and the Irish band Lúnasa.

The tracks on Lowlands draw from a number of sonic influences, including African, Appalachian, Arabic music. Additionally, McKeown re-imagines a number of traditional Irish songs, including "Lord Baker," "Bonny Greenwoodside," and "The Moorlough Shore." The traditional Scottish song "The Dark Haired Girl" was translated into Irish by McKeown.

Upon its release, Lowlands was lauded by music critics from various trade publications, including AllMusic, Billboard, Pulse!, Hot Press, and Green Man Review, among others. In support of the album, McKeown played the 2000 Glastonbury Festival in Somerset, England, in a line-up including Coldplay, Saint Etienne, and The Dandy Warhols. British music publication Q Magazine later deemed McKeown "the surprise hit of the 2000 festival." The following year she embarked on an international tour of the United States, United Kingdom, and Ireland to further support the album.

== Critical reception ==
Lowlands was met with critical praise from various media outlets. Sarah McQuaid, in a profile for Hot Press noted "Lowlands has had critics falling over themselves to laud McKeown's return to traditional Irish material." Rick Anderson, in a review for AllMusic awarded the album 5 stars, writing:

Susan McKeown is an Irish folk musician with an unusually diverse resume. She has made albums of original music and albums of traditional songs, including a stunning collection of seasonal tunes entitled Through the Bitter Frost and Snow, on which the primary instruments were McKeown's voice and Lindsey Horner's string bass. She has also collaborated with numerous musicians from traditions both within and without the Celtic the world, and her music has been used in TV commercials for products as diverse as facial cream and automobiles. At this point, the only really surprising thing she could have done would have been to make a primarily traditional Irish album, which is exactly what she's done with the beautiful Lowlands. Granted, the instrumentation is frequently unusual -- on the haunting "Dark Horse on the Wind" she's accompanied by banjo and erhu (a Chinese bowed instrument), and on "Bonny Greenwoodside" she plays finger cymbals while others play the tabla and caxixis. But the songs are very definitely from the Irish tradition, and her delivery is as hair-raising as ever. Highlights include the slightly flamenco-flavored "Slan agus Beannacht (Goodbye and Farewell)" and the anguished, a capella "Dark Horse on the Wind." Highly recommended.

Patrick O’Donnell of Green Man Review was equally effusive, noting "If there is magic in music, Susan McKeown surely is a mage, for how else can her enchanting vocals and entangling arrangements be explained? Her amber tones weave a spell when first they are heard, and you are not yourself again until the music comes to an end. Lowlands, her sixth album, is one of the most fascinating works I have listened to in what seems ages. There isn’t a bad song – not even a mediocre one – on this 12-track CD."

== Track listing ==
All tracks are written by Susan McKeown.

Bones track listing
No.	Title	Length
1.	"The Dark Haired Girl (An Nighean Dudh)"	4:11
2.	"Johnny Coughlin"	5:04
3.	"The Hare's Lament"	3:13
4.	"Slan Agus Beannacht/Goodbye and Farewell"	2:03
5.	"The Snows They Melt the Soonest"	4:27
6.	"Nansau Og Ni Obarlain/Young Nancy Oberlin"	2:20
7.	"Lord Baker"	8:47
8.	"Dark Horse on the Wind"	4:41
9.	"The Lowlands of Holland"	5:27
10.	"Bonny Greenwoodside"	2:42
11.	"To Fair London Town"	4:02
12.	"The Moorlough Shore"	5:05
Total length:		52:02

== Personnel ==
=== Primary artist ===
- Susan McKeown – vocals; composer; arranger; translator; finger cymbals; producer

=== Guest artists ===
- Glen Moore – acoustic bass
- Matt Darriau – bass; clarinet; bass clarinet; gaita; Irish flute; kaval
- Lúnasa - fiddle; Uilleann pipes; flute; low whistles; guitar; and double bass
- Mamadou Diabate – kora
- Joanie Madden – whistle
- Samir Chatterjee – tabla

=== Musicians ===
- Trevor Hutchinson – acoustic bass
- Greg Anderson – bouzouki
- Todd Schietroma – cajones; caxixi; handclapping; shaker
- John Anthony – caxixi; mixing
- Michelle Kinney – cello
- Ole Mathisen – clarinet
- Johnny Cunningham – fiddle
- Sean Smyth – fiddle
- Des Moore – guitar
- Gerry Leonard – guitar; guitar loops
- Aidan Brennan – guitar
- Donogh Hennessy – guitar; producer

=== Production ===
- Jamshied Sharifi – producer; synthesizer; wind arrangements
- Liam Weldon – composer
- Cathal Goan – translator
- Scott Noll – engineer
- Oliver Strauss – engineer; handclapping
- Rick Rowe – mastering
- John Francis Bourke – photography
