= Deirdre Shannon =

Irish singer (born 1974)

- Birth name: Deirdre Gilsenan
- Born: 19 July 1974 (age 50); County Meath, Ireland
- Genres: Celtic; classical
- Occupation: Singer
- Instrument: Vocals
- Years active: 1996–present
- Labels: Celtic Collections; Manhattan
- Website: www.deirdreshannon.com

Deirdre Gilsenan is an Irish singer who has toured with a variety of Celtic music groups, such as Anúna, Celtic Thunder and Celtic Woman. She is better known by the stage name Deirdre Shannon.

== Early life ==
Shannon was born into the Gilsenan family in County Meath, Ireland, as the middle child of five siblings.

Shannon's exposure to music came very early on from her parents and older siblings. Her formal introduction came at the age of nine when she was enrolled for piano lessons. She and her siblings participated in the church choir and in local events, including weddings, funerals and local concerts.

== Career ==
In 1992, Shannon entered Dublin's College of Music and studied under the guidance of vocal trainer Mary Brennan. She participated in many musical activities, including traveling with the Dublin Institute of Technology Choir.

Shannon began her professional career in 1996 when she was selected to be a member of the Irish choir Anúna.

In 1997, Shannon was selected by Michael Flatley to join his worldwide tour with the show Lord of the Dance. She was cast into the role of Erin the Goddess and performed in over 800 shows over a four-year period covering most of North and South America.

Since her professional debut, Shannon has performed with artists including Eily O'Grady, Dionne Warwick, The Celtic Tenors, Air Supply, and Celtic Woman. Shannon's accomplishments have also included participating in the sound track of RTÉ's historical documentary television series called The Island. She has also made appearances on CBS Morning News, Fox Morning TV, and The Late Late Show.

On 1 October 2006, Shannon released her solo album, simply entitled Deirdre Shannon.

Playing the role of the Gentlewoman, Shannon also sings "Harry's Game" as well as other songs in Celtic Thunder: Storm which was released on CD and DVD on 20 September 2011.

== Personal life ==
Shannon married her husband Alan in June 2012.

== Discography ==
Solo

- Deirdre Shannon (2006)
- Anamċeol (2011)

With Celtic Thunder

- Celtic Thunder: Storm (2011)
