= Susan McFadden =

Irish actress and singer (born 1983)

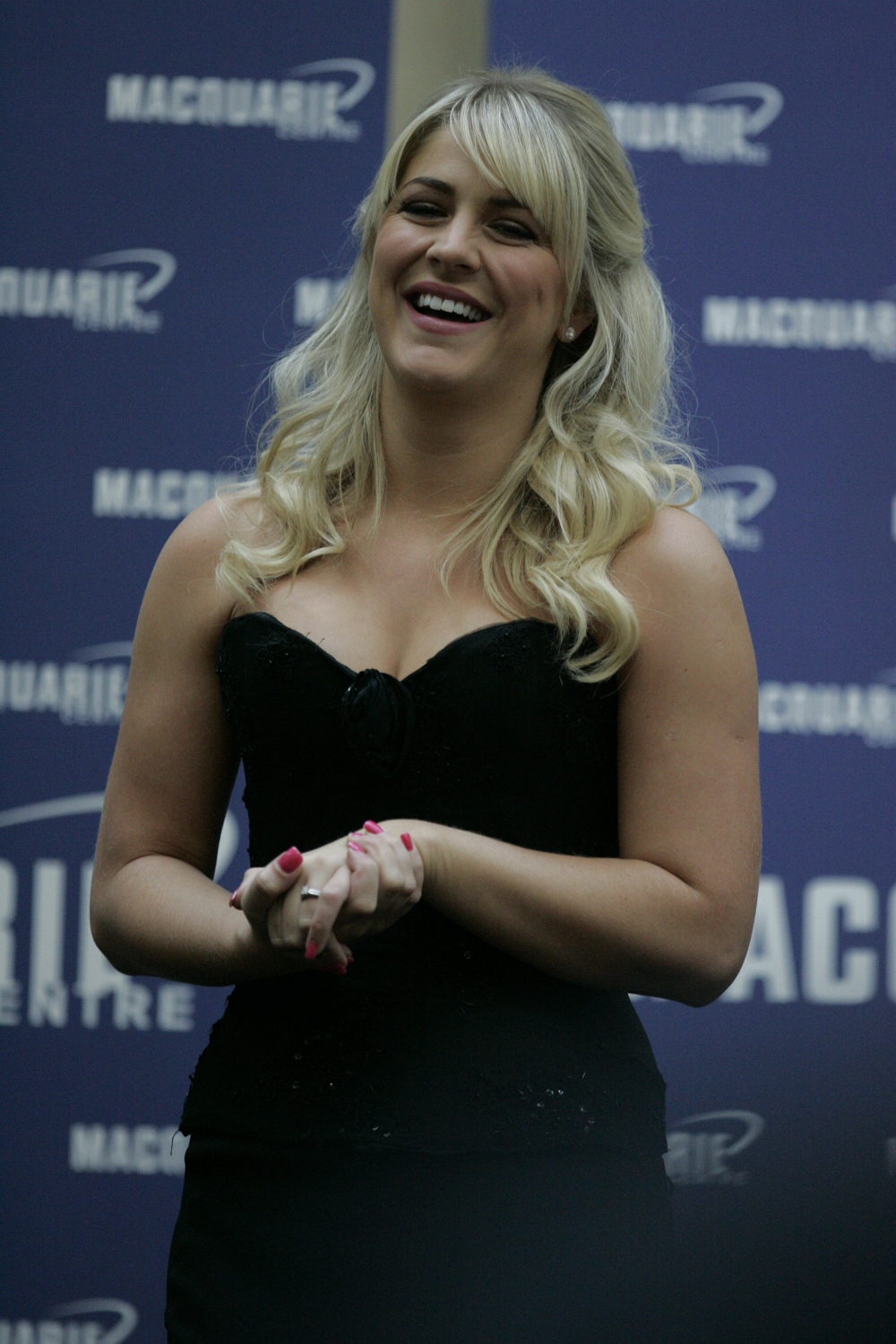
- McFadden in 2012

Background information
- Born: 8 February 1983 (age 43); Dublin, Ireland
- Origin: Artane, Dublin
- Genres: Celtic; classical; musical theatre soundtrack
- Occupations: Singer, actress
- Years active: 2007–present
- Labels: Celtic Collections, Manhattan

Susan McFadden (born 8 February 1983) is an Irish actress and singer. She is best known for playing the roles of Sandy in Grease and Elle Woods in Legally Blonde the Musical in London's West End and being a member of Celtic Woman from 2012 to 2018.

== Early life ==
Susan McFadden was born in Dublin, Ireland, in 1983, to parents Mairead and Brendan. She is the younger sister of former Westlife member Brian McFadden.

== Career ==
McFadden is a graduate of the Billie Barry Stage School, located in Dublin. She toured with many Irish entertainers (including June Rodgers) in supporting roles.

She was one of the dancers in Daniel O'Donnell's Rock & Roll Show tour and DVD. She also played the role of Kathy in an Irish production of Singing in the Rain in 2004 to much acclaim. The show played at the Olympia Theatre in Dublin and the Everyman Palace Theatre in Cork.

She was the winning contestant on the ITV reality TV show Grease Is the Word. As a result, she played the lead female role of Sandy in the West End production of Grease with Danny Bayne beginning in August 2007.

In 2008, McFadden recorded two songs for the CD Act One – Songs From The Musicals Of Alexander S. Bermange, an album of 20 brand new recordings by 26 West End stars, released in November 2008 on Dress Circle Records.

She played the lead role of Milly in the 2008 UK tour of Seven Brides for Seven Brothers, opposite Steven Houghton.

McFadden sang with Ben Morris and Séan Carey in the final of RTÉ One's Fame: The Musical in Dublin on Sunday 13 June 2010.

McFadden starred in the original West End cast of the musical Legally Blonde at the Savoy Theatre in London's West End playing Elle Woods after originating the role of Serena. Official reviews and audience reaction were extremely positive. Beginning on 25 October, McFadden became the alternate Elle, performing Mondays and Tuesdays. McFadden began playing the role of Elle Woods full-time beginning 10 January 2011 and left the role on 9 July 2011 and has been nominated for a WhatsOnStage award for "best takeover". She was subsequently replaced by former Margot and understudy Elle Carley Stenson.

== Celtic Woman ==
On 5 January 2012, McFadden was named as a replacement for Lisa Kelly, then going on maternity leave, in the all-female ensemble Celtic Woman. McFadden debuted with Celtic Woman in February at Nashville, Tennessee, for the kickoff of the "Believe" North American Tour and continued with the European, Australian, and South African Tours in 2012. After Kelly announced her departure from the group was permanent in January 2013, McFadden became a full-time member of Celtic Woman. She toured with the group for six and a half years.

On 12 August 2018, it was announced that McFadden would be taking leave from the group to have her first child.

In October 2019, Susan rejoined Celtic Woman for a few shows filling in for Mairéad Carlin while she recovered from appendicitis.

On 22 January 2020, it was announced that Susan would be rejoining Celtic Woman for six shows during the US Celebration tour, but the tour was postponed shortly after due to the coronavirus pandemic. That tour eventually took place in the spring of 2022, and Susan fulfilled her promised six-show commitment.

She also rejoined for the recording of "Postcards from Ireland" as well as the Postcards from Ireland Tour.

== Personal life ==
McFadden is married to Celtic Woman's former bagpiper Anthony Byrne. Their first child was born November 2018, and a second child was born in May 2021.

== Discography ==
With Celtic Woman

- Emerald: Musical Gems (2014)
- O Christmas Tree (2014)
- Solo (May 2015)
- Destiny (2015)
- Voices of Angels (2016)
- The Best of Christmas (2017)
- Homecoming: Live from Ireland (2018)
- Celebration: 15 Years of Music and Magic (2020)
- Postcards from Ireland (2021)
- Christmas Cards from Ireland (2022)

Other featured performances

- Act One – Songs From The Musicals Of Alexander S. Bermange (November 2008)

== Filmography ==
- Celtic Woman: Home for Christmas (October 2013)
- Celtic Woman: Emerald - Musical Gems (February 2014)
- Celtic Woman: Destiny (October 2015)
- Celtic Woman: Homecoming Live from Ireland (January 2018)
- Celtic Woman: Postcards from Ireland (January 2022)
