= Éabha McMahon =

Éabha McMahon Éabha Nic Mhathúna
- Born: 9 December 1990 (age 35); Dublin, Ireland
- Genres: Celtic
- Occupations: Singer, songwriter
- Instruments: Vocals; guitar; tin whistle
- Years active: 1998–present

Éabha McMahon (/ˈeɪvə/ AY-və; Irish: Éabha Nic Mhathúna) is an Irish singer and a former member of the ensemble Celtic Woman. In 2020 she began recording music under the name AVA.

== Early life ==
Éabha was born in Dublin, Ireland on 9 December 1990. She is a fluent Irish speaker and was brought up singing and speaking Irish at home in Dublin. English was not spoken at home until Éabha was 6 years old.

Éabha attended an Irish speaking primary school. When she was 5 years old, she was inspired by her teachers to become a member of the local Sean Nos choir.

Éabha holds a Human Rights degree from NUI Galway. She was a member of the musical society at NUI Galway.

After graduating, Éabha spent time in Vietnam and Mongolia. There, she worked with Christina Noble and the Christina Noble Children's Foundation.

== Career ==
Éabha began her singing career in 1998 when, at the age of 8, she was chosen by Veritas to record an album for Beo go Deo, a children's book. She then began singing in sean-nós, a traditional style, taught by such singers as Moya Brennan, Máire Ní Choilm, Íde Mac Mathúna, and Séamus Mac Mathúna.

At the age of 15, Éabha won the under-18 All Ireland Oireachtais final. From age 13 to 17, she was the reigning Leinster champion in the Irish music competition Fleadh Ceoil. Between the ages of 14 and 18, she was the Dublin champion in the Fairview Feis Ceoil 5 times.

Éabha joined Anúna at the age of 15. In 2008, she recorded the PBS holiday special Anúna: Christmas Memories, released that year on DVD and CD. In 2015 she featured as a soloist on the song Fill, Fill a Rún on the Anúna album Revelation.

In 2015, Éabha headlined a sold-out solo show in New York City, in aid of Kylemore Abbey.

Luke Kavanagh, a former college classmate of Éabha's, saw a video on YouTube of her singing Just Cry, one of her songs. Luke referred the video to his father David Kavanagh, the then-chairman and chief executive of Celtic Woman Ltd. Éabha was subsequently invited to audition for Celtic Woman.

Éabha joined Celtic Woman in July 2015. Éabha replaced Lisa Lambe in the ensemble. She remained in the group until 22 January 2020, when it was announced she was taking a leave to pursue her own projects.

In 2020, Eabha began releasing new solo music under the name "AVA." In April, 2021, she released her first album, "Wildflower", on CD and streaming platforms.

== Personal life ==
Éabha married Irish physician John Gaffney in August 2018. On 5 December 2021, Éabha announced that she is expecting her first child, a girl.

== Discography ==
As AVA

- Wildflower (2021)

With Anúna

- Christmas Memories (2008)
- Revelation (2015)

With Celtic Woman

- Celtic Woman: Destiny (2015)
- Celtic Woman: Voices of Angels (2016)
- Celtic Woman: The Best of Christmas (2017)
- Celtic Woman: Homecoming Live from Ireland (2018)
- Celtic Woman: Ancient Land (2018)
- Celtic Woman: The Magic of Christmas (2019)
- Celtic Woman: Celebration-15 Years of Music and Magic (2020) (compilation album)
