= Westering Home =

Scottish folk song by Hugh S. Roberton

- by Hugh S. Roberton
- Genre: Traditional Folk, Slow march
- Language: Scots
- Melody: The Muckin' o' Geordie's Byre
- Composed: 1920s

"Westering Home" is a traditional Scottish folk song that was written by Hugh S. Roberton in the 1920s. The lyrics of the song talk about the Scottish Island of Islay. It was subsequently adopted as the slow march of the Royal Navy.

== Lyrics ==
It runs as follows:

Chorus

Westering home, and a song in the air,
Light in the eye and it's goodbye to care.
Laughter o' love, and a welcoming there,
Isle of my heart, my own one.

Verse 1
Tell me o' lands o' the Orient gay,
Speak o' the riches and joys o' Cathay;
Eh, but it's grand to be wakin' ilk day
To find yourself nearer to Islay.

Verse 2
Where are the folk like the folk o' the west?
Canty and couthy and kindly, the best.
There I would hie me and there I would rest
At hame wi' my ain folk in Islay.

Verse 3
Now I'm at home and at home I do lay
Dreaming of riches that come from Cathay
I'll hop a good ship and be on my way
And bring back my fortune to Islay

"Ilk" means each. "Canty" means neat or trim. "Couthy" means homely, simple, unpretentious. "Islay" is pronounced "Isla".

== Tune ==
The tune is a modified version of the traditional "The Muckin o Geordie's Byre", with the time signature changed from 6/8 to 3/4, and the rhythm slightly altered. Roberton appropriated this form of the melody from a Gaelic song with lyrics relating to nostalgia for Skye in the trenches of the First World War, one of several entitled Eilean mo Chrìdh'. Its English title Isle of my Heart features in Roberton’s lyric.
