= Téir Abhaile Riú =

Irish folk song

Téir Abhaile Riú, also known as Teidhir abhaile Riú, Teigh abhaile Riú or even just simply Teir abhaile, is an Irish folk song. A young woman, or girl, is told to return home as her match has been made. The lyrics for the song vary. In most versions, the woman, or girl, debates with someone about whether or not the match is made. In some versions she is told to marry the piper.

The version written for Celtic Woman contains mostly English words and adds information about her reputation, as compared to other popular versions. The song may have been composed in the 18th century, but surely by the 19th.

== Notable recordings ==
- Clannad - Clannad 2 (1974)
- Pádraigín Ní Uallacháin - A Stór Is a Stórín(1994)
- Shebeen - Celtic Traveler (1991)
- John Spillane - More Irish songs we learned at school
- Cruachan - The Morrigan's Call (2006)
- Celtic Woman - Believe (2011)
- Saoirse - Music Evermore (2012)
- Celtic Woman - Celtic Woman 20 (2024)
