= Dúlamán =

Irish folk song

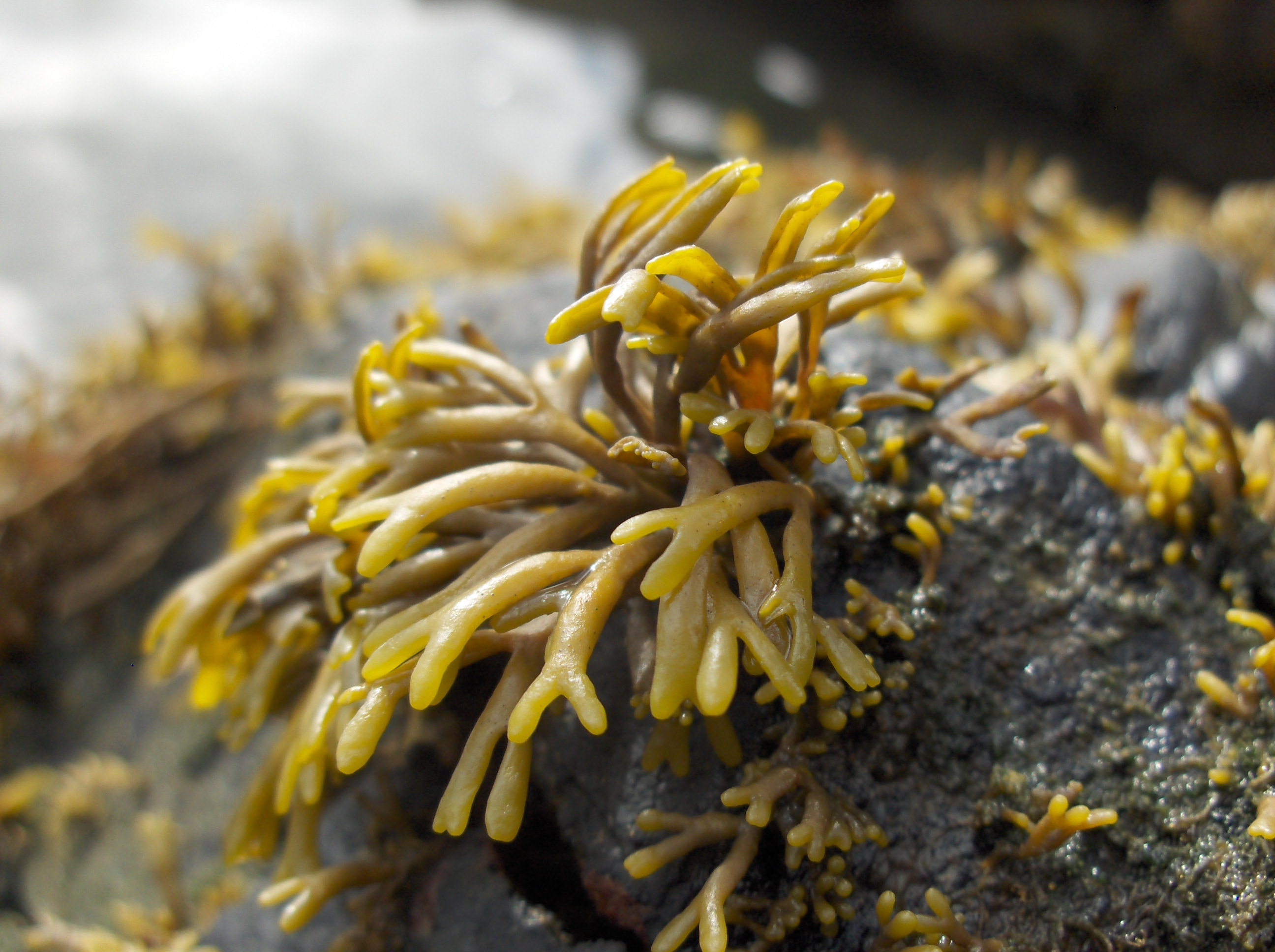
Tá ceann buí óir ar an dúlaman – "Channel wrack has a golden yellow head"

"Dúlamán" (Irish for 'channel wrack', a type of edible seaweed) is an Irish folk song.

The song has been associated with seaweed gathering and, more broadly, with the cultural and economic importance of seaweed in coastal Ireland.

The traditional tune has been recorded by groups including Clannad and Altan. Reviewing Altan’s 1993 album Island Angel, Liam Fay wrote that Mairéad Ní Mhaonaigh’s performance of “Dúlamán” was “truly haunting” and counted it among her best vocal performances to date. A version by Celtic Woman appeared on the 2007 album A New Journey. Michael McGlynn’s 1995 choral setting of “Dúlamán”, written for male ensemble, does not use the traditional tune but instead builds a new setting from the rhythmic inflection of the Irish text.

The song was used in the 2014 Irish animated film Song of the Sea. The version used in the film was performed by Kíla.

The song title was later used by the Irish music and dance act Dúlamán – Voice of the Celts, which reached the final of the German talent show Das Supertalent in 2017.
