= Lisa Lambe =

Irish singer, actress, songwriter & folklorist

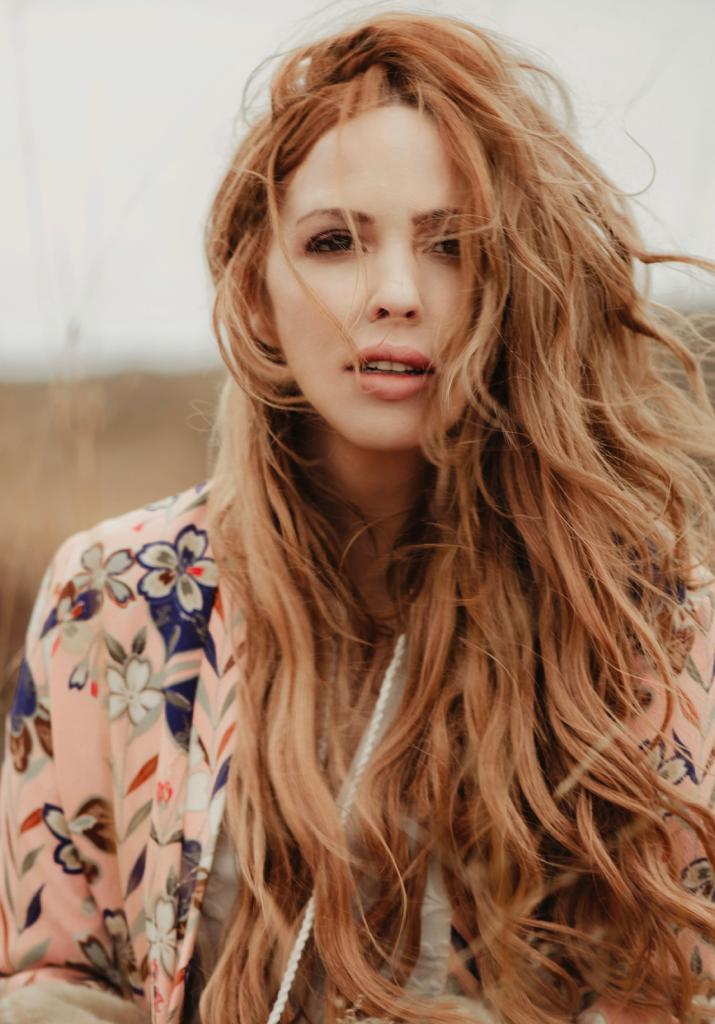
- Lambe in promotional still for Juniper (2020)
- Born: Dublin, Ireland
- Education: Trinity College, Dublin
- Occupations: Singer; actress; songwriter; folklorist
- Musical career
- Genres: Folk; Irish traditional
- Website: Official website

Lisa Lambe is an Irish singer, actress, songwriter and folklorist.

== Early life and education ==
Lambe was born in Dublin, the youngest in a family of ten children. She graduated with a degree in acting from Trinity College Dublin. She also subsequently obtained an M.A. in Irish Folklore.

== Acting career ==
In 2005, Lambe was nominated for a Best Actress Award at the Irish Times Theatre Awards for her performance in the lead role of Philomena O'Shea in Rough Magic's musical Improbable Frequency.

Lambe's theatrical play roles have included Anna Karenina and Johanna in Sweeney Todd at the Gate Theatre; Oonagh in Jimmy's Hall, Lil -written specifically for her- in The Country Girls by Edna O'Brien, and Patsy in The Unmanageable Sisters at the Abbey Theatre; Sorcha in Ross O'Carroll-Kelly's The Last Days of the Celtic Tiger, Breaking Dad, Between Foxrock and a Hard Place at the Gaiety Theatre and Nora in A Doll's House at the Helix Theatre. She played the role of 'Fairy' in Hex at the National Theatre in London in late 2022 to early 2023.

She played Elizabeth O'Farrell in The Bloody Irish, written for PBS in 2015.

== Music career ==
Lambe is a featured soloist and performs regularly with Ireland's RTÉ Concert Orchestra.

She was a member of Celtic Woman from 2010, staying with the group until 2014 and appearing on the albums: Believe (2011), Home For Christmas (2012), and Emerald: Musical Gems (2014). She also appears on several compilation albums after her departure. In October 2024, it was announced that Lambe had temporarily rejoined the group for their White Christmas Symphony tour, taking the place of Emma Warren.

Her first solo album, Hiding Away, was recorded in Nashville and released in 2015. The single "Heaven" from this album featured some of the members of ALONE Ireland, a charity with which Lambe is affiliated. She released her second solo album, Juniper, in 2020. It was written in Connemara and recorded in Donegal Ireland with producer Karl Odlum, and was described by evoke.ie as "a love letter to Ireland". Lambe released her third solo album, Wild Red, in November, 2021. Her new album was BBC Radio's album of the week and placed in Goldmine USA Magazine's Top 100 songs of 2021. Lisa Lambe Live was released in 2023.

She has recorded works for several film projects, including the soundtracks of Float Like a Butterfly and An Klondike.

"Nightvisiting", Lambe's folklore, ballad songs and stories show, began touring Ireland in 2023.

== Selected filmography ==
- Float Like a Butterfly - Samson Films
- RTÉ Thanks for the Memories: Brendan Grace
- Bachelors Walk
- The Bloody Irish! Songs of the 1916 Rising - PBS

== Discography ==
=== Solo ===
- Hiding Away 2015
- Juniper April 3, 2020
- Wild Red 2021
- Lisa Lambe Live 2023
- Nightvisting: The Hauling Home 2025
