= Mairéad Carlin =

Mairéad Carlin Mairéad Ní Cearbhalláin
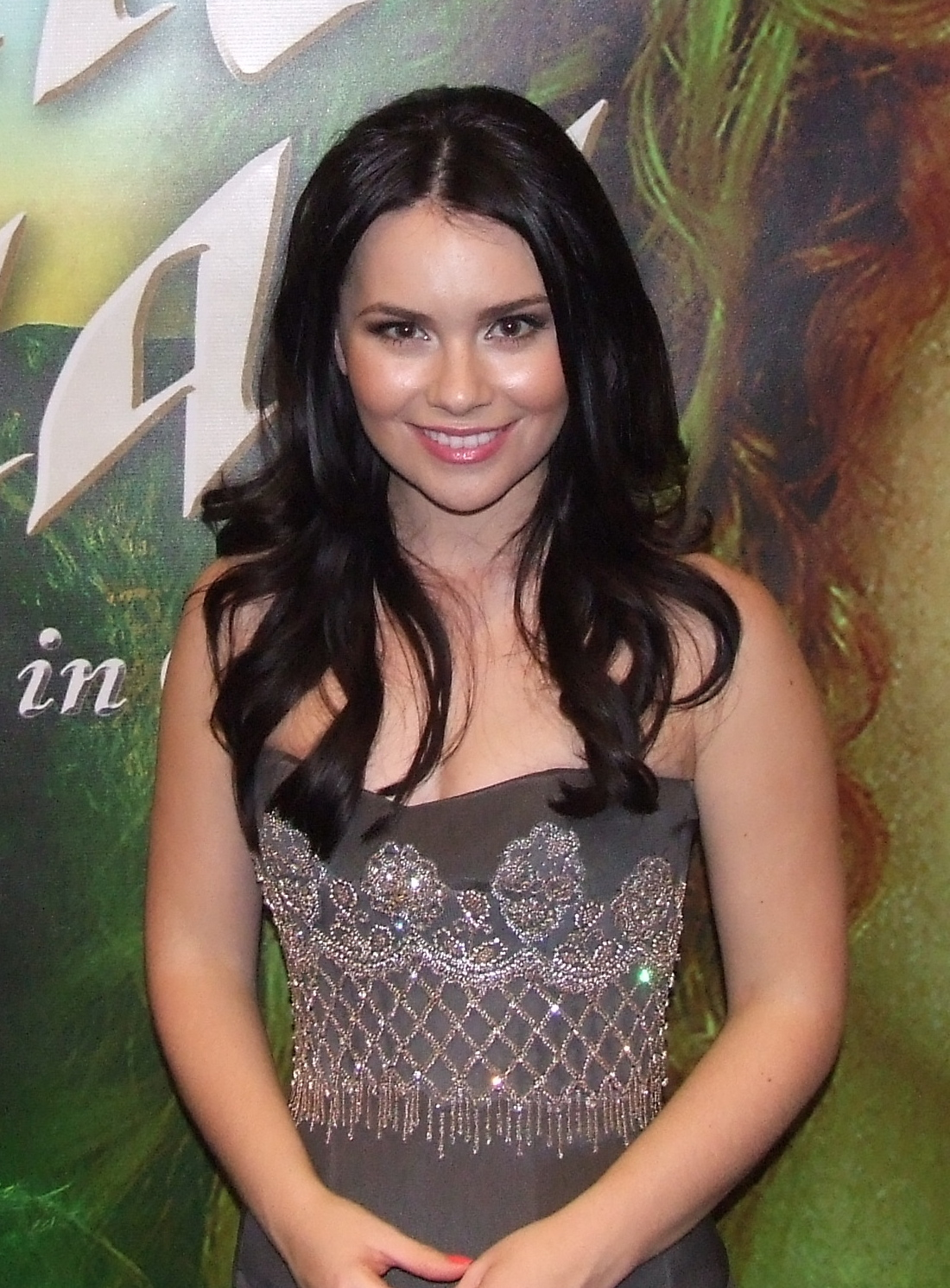
- Mairéad Carlin at a Brisbane Concert in January 2014

Background information
- Born: Derry, Northern Ireland
- Genres: Celtic; Classical; Folk
- Occupation: Singer
- Years active: 2004–present
- Labels: Decca; Manhattan Records
- Member of: Celtic Woman

Mairéad Carlin is an Irish singer. She is a former member of the ensemble Celtic Woman and was the first-ever member of the group that was born in Northern Ireland.

== Early life ==
Carlin was born in Derry. "Derry, my hometown, is a very cultured and musical place; wherever you turn there's always music...That was especially true in my family... We’d just sit around the fire, sing, and drink tea".

== Career ==
Carlin began her career at the age of 15 when she won the title role of 'The Rose' in BBC Talents 'Young Singers' competition in the opera The Little Prince, by Rachel Portman. It aired on BBC Two and PBS and The Walt Disney Company in America.

Carlin trained in vocal performance at Trinity Laban Conservatoire of Music and Dance in London. Once she graduated, she was offered a postgraduate scholarship in Musical Theatre by the Royal Academy of Music. She declined the scholarship when offered a deal with Decca Records. Carlin continued to train with Mary Hammond and Simon Lee.

Carlin performed for the President of Ireland, celebrated the Irish Anthem for the England-Ireland Rugby International to a TV audience of millions. She shared the stage with Snow Patrol and The Priests at the 2013 BBC TV Gala Concert ‘Sons and Daughters’ to mark Derry's year as City of Culture. She also recorded the City of Culture anthem ‘Let The River Run’ with Glee star Damian McGinty. Carly Simon was impressed by the song, saying "I just played it and cried my eyes out and I'm still crying and one big smiling when she's excited. It's absolutely stunningly wonderful. Thank you for doing me proud." Simon later invited Carlin and McGinty to perform live with her in Los Angeles at an Oceana benefit concert presented by Hillary Clinton, Ted Danson and Harvey Weinstein. Simon subsequently released the single under her own label Iris Records/Walled City Records.

Carlin (as Jennifer) toured the UK and Ireland with American singer-songwriter Don McLean, including a sold out concert at the Royal Albert Hall. In early 2013, she made her debut with the National Symphony Orchestra in the National Concert Hall for RTÉ TV. She was the featured soprano on 'White Light' in the box office hit Alan Partridge: Alpha Papa with music by Ilan Eshkeri.

"A motto I’ve used throughout my career so far", she says, "is a quote from the award-winning poet Seamus Heaney: ‘Sing yourself to where the singing comes from.’ I think there's a lot to be said for that".

After finishing her degree, Carlin was signed to Decca Records and recorded her debut album, Songbook with the London Philharmonic Orchestra in Air Studios and British Grove Studios. It was mixed by Grammy award winning engineer Geoff Foster. Carlin describes the album as portraying the more 'vulnerable' side to her sound and a 'transition period in my life where I was finding myself- I guess I was growing up through this album. In every breath and in every note, there's a story...believe me'.

=== Celtic Woman ===
On 5 August 2013 the Celtic Woman website reported that Chloë Agnew would be taking a break from Celtic Woman to work on solo projects. On 23 August 2013 it was reported Carlin would be taking Chloë's place. On 13 January 2021, Carlin announced that she was taking a break from the group to focus on other projects. In 2023 she announced her return to Celtic Woman for the Christmas 2023 tour and the 20th anniversary special. On 2 September 2026 it was revealed on the Celtic Woman website that Carlin would be taking a hiatus from the ensemble to have a child with the possibility of returning to the group.

Sending our warmest wishes to Máiréad as she steps away to begin a new chapter with Ronan [her husband]. Huge congratulations to them both! We’re incredibly grateful for everything Máiréad has brought to Celtic Woman and wish her every happiness in this exciting new chapter. We hope to welcome her back to the Celtic Woman family again soon.

== Personal ==
In September 2016, she married singer and dancer Ronan Scolard.

== Discography ==
Solo

- Songbook (2013)

With Celtic Woman

- Celtic Woman: Destiny (2015)
- Celtic Woman: Voices of Angels (2016)
- Celtic Woman: The Best of Christmas (2017)
- Celtic Woman: Homecoming Live from Ireland (2018)
- Celtic Woman: Ancient Land (2018)
- Celtic Woman: The Magic of Christmas (2019)
- Celtic Woman: Celebration 15 years of Music and Magic (2020)
- Celtic Woman: 20 (20th Anniversary) (2024)
- Celtic Woman: Nollaig: A Christmas Journey (2025)
