= Celtic Woman =

All-female Irish musical ensemble

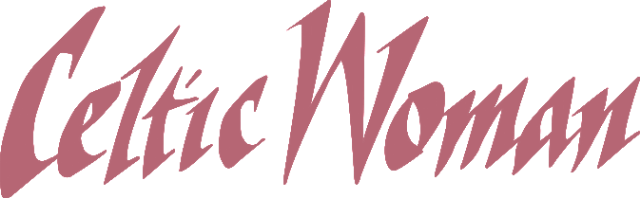
- Logo in 2017

Background information
- Origin: Ireland
- Genres: Celtic; folk; new-age; adult contemporary/pop; classical crossover
- Years active: 2004–present
- Label: Manhattan
- Members: Eiméar Crealey; Kate Heneghan; Muirgen O'Mahony; Caitríona Sherlock
- Past members: Chloë Agnew; Órla Fallon; Lisa Kelly; Méav Ní Mhaolchatha; Máiréad Nesbitt; Deirdre Shannon; Hayley Westenra; Lynn Hilary; Alex Sharpe; Lisa Lambe; Susan McFadden; Éabha McMahon; Tara McNeill; Megan Walsh; Hannah Traynor; Emma Warren; Ciara Ní Mhurchú; Mairéad Carlin
- Website: CelticWoman.com

Celtic Woman is an all-female Irish musical ensemble, formed in 2004 for a one-time event held in Dublin, Ireland. They started touring internationally as a group after multiple airings on PBS helped to boost the group's popularity.

Celtic Woman released their debut album Celtic Woman in 2004 and have since released more than 20 albums. They have sold more than nine million records worldwide. The group's line-up has changed over the years, involving vocalists and a fiddler. It was founded with Chloë Agnew, Órla Fallon, Lisa Kelly, Méav Ní Mhaolchatha, and Máiréad Nesbitt. They have been described as being "Riverdance for the voice."

Celtic Woman has been named Billboard World Album Artist of the Year six times.

== History ==
=== 2004–2005: debut ===
Celtic Woman originated from a one-time event held at The Helix in Dublin organized by producer Sharon Brown, executive producer David "Dave" Kavannagh, television producer and director Avril MacRory, and musical director David Downes on 15 September 2004. Downes, a former musical director of the Irish stage show Riverdance, recruited five Irish female musicians who had not previously performed together, vocalists Chloë Agnew, Órla Fallon, Lisa Kelly and Méav Ní Mhaolchatha, and fiddler Máiréad Nesbitt. Downes also chose a repertoire that ranged from traditional Celtic tunes to modern songs.

This performance was first broadcast on PBS during March 2005 in the United States. Within weeks the group's eponymous debut album, Celtic Woman, reached No. 1 on Billboard's World Music chart, eventually breaking Andrea Bocelli's long-standing record of chart-topping longevity on 22 July 2006 by having stayed at No. 1 for 68 weeks. The album held the top position on the Billboard World Music chart for 81 weeks total. Much of the group's success in America has been credited to the extensive PBS publicity throughout 2005. The live performance at The Helix was released on DVD alongside the studio album.

Celtic Woman has performed numerous tours in North America, with additional ones overseas. The group appeared live in more than a dozen US cities in 2005 for their original album debut, Celtic Woman The Show. This was followed by all five members' solo albums recorded between 2000 and 2004 being released in the US on 10 January 2006. During Méav's pregnancy in 2005, Deirdre Shannon was selected to fill her place during tours.

=== 2006–2008: A Christmas Celebration, A New Journey ===
The release of the second album, Celtic Woman: A Christmas Celebration, on 19 October 2006 knocked their first album to the No. 2 spot on the World Music chart.

Méav returned to the group in time to record A New Journey and tour for that album, coinciding with Deirdre's departure from the group in February 2006. On 6 September 2006, it was announced that Hayley Westenra officially joined Celtic Woman on 24 August 2006. As well as being featured on the album and DVD for A New Journey, Hayley alternated with Méav during tour events to maintain the live five-person line-up.

In preparation for their third studio album, Celtic Woman performed at Slane Castle in County Meath, Ireland, on 23 and 24 August 2006, with this show airing on PBS during December 2006. The studio album, titled Celtic Woman: A New Journey, was released on 30 January 2007. As with their debut, the live performance was released on DVD simultaneously. This album immediately hit the Billboard 200 at No. 4 and the Billboard World Music chart at No. 1, moving their previous two releases down a notch and securing the top three positions on that chart for the group.

In response to the popularity of the performance at Slane Castle in 2006, PBS aired a special concert of Celtic Woman performing again in The Helix Theatre, Dublin, Ireland on 7 December 2007. This performance included songs from the group's second album, Celtic Woman: A Christmas Celebration.

The group toured the United States twice with their A New Journey tour, visiting 88 cities in 2007 and over 75 cities in 2008. In early April 2008 it was announced that The High Kings would be opening the act for the group through June 2008. The tour began on 14 February 2007 in Tampa with initial dates announced through 29 June 2007. New dates for Europe running 22 September 22 to 9 October 2007 were announced in May 2007 along with fall North American dates running 10 October to 17 November 2007 and some Japan dates. The tour finished on 6 October 2008 in Amsterdam.

On 20 August 2007, Méav left Celtic Woman to focus on her solo career. Méav's replacement, Lynn Hilary, made her first appearance on 10 October 2007 in Estero, Florida, United States. In December 2007, Lisa Kelly, who was expecting her third child in 2008, took maternity leave from the group. Alex Sharpe filled her position on the A New Journey tour during this leave.

=== 2009–2010: The Greatest Journey, Songs from the Heart ===
A fourth album, Celtic Woman: The Greatest Journey, was released on 28 October 2008. The 2009 Isle of Hope tour was announced in late 2008. It began in the Spring of 2009 and finished on 22 November 2009. It was announced on the group's website in 2009 that Órla Fallon was taking a full break to spend time with her family and to focus on recording a new solo album, and that as a result of this, Alex would be replacing her.

The group's fifth album, Celtic Woman: Songs from the Heart, was released 26 January 2010. It peaked at No. 48 in July 2010 on the ARIA Top 50 Albums chart. For the album, PBS television presented a special concert starting 28 November 2009. It was taped in HD at Powerscourt House and Gardens in Enniskerry, County Wicklow. It included a 27-member film orchestra, Discovery Gospel choir, 12-member Aontas Choir, 10-member Extreme Rhythm Drummers with an 11-piece bagpipe ensemble.

For the 2009 Isle of Hope Tour, the group comprised vocalists Chloë Agnew, Lynn Hilary, Lisa Kelly, and Alex Sharpe; and fiddler Máiréad Nesbitt. This group completed the entire 2009 tour as well as the first leg of the Songs from the Heart tour, from February to May 2010, with this line-up. After the tour ended, it was announced that Alex Sharpe would take a full-time break from Celtic Woman to spend time with her family. After the Songs from the Heart tour, in November 2010, Lynn Hilary announced that she was leaving the group to return to Ireland. Singer and actress Lisa Lambe joined the group as a replacement for Lynn in early 2011.

The 2010 tour featured some of the same music and some new music. The tour featured Chloë Agnew, Lisa Kelly, Lynn Hilary, Alex Sharpe, and Máiréad Nesbitt. It began in February 2010. A second Songs from the Heart tour opened in February 2011 with Agnew, Kelly, new member Lisa Lambe, and Nesbitt and consisted of about 80 concerts in North America in spring 2011 and 10 performances in Germany and Austria during summer 2011.

2010 would also see the group provide the soundtrack for the Wii game Endless Ocean: Adventures of the Deep, a sequel to the 2007 game Endless Ocean for which member Hayley Westenra provided vocals.

=== 2011–2012: Believe, A Christmas Celebration ===
The group released their sixth album, Lullaby, available through PBS pledge or the QVC shopping website. On 15 February 2011, it was released by other major retailers as a limited edition album. It reached No. 1 on the World Charts and No. 3 on the Children's Charts, a first for Celtic Woman.

The Christmas Symphony Tour featuring songs from their Christmas Album A Christmas Celebration took place during December 2011.

In December 2011, Lisa Kelly announced that she would be taking maternity leave from the group, expecting her fourth child, after the Symphony Tour was over; it was announced that Susan McFadden would be filling in for Kelly until she returned to the group. However, Kelly would later announce the opening of "The Lisa Kelly Voice Academy" in Peachtree City, Georgia, in January 2013 saying that she was moving on from performing to teaching, leaving Susan to become a full member.

The group filmed a new special on 6 and 7 September 2011 at the Fox Theater in Atlanta, Georgia for PBS broadcast and DVD release. It is titled Celtic Woman: Believe. The show aired on PBS stations on 3 December 2011. The CD/DVD was released on 24 January 2012.

The Believe 2012 North American Tour ran between February 2012 and April 2012. Following directly onto this, the BELIEVE European tour took place between May and June 2012.

On 9 October 2012, the group released its second worldwide Christmas album Home for Christmas. This album features the voices of Lisa Lambe, Chloë Agnew, Méav Ní Mhaolchatha, and Máiréad Nesbitt on the fiddle. Another Christmas album, Celtic Woman: Silent Night was released on the same day for the United States exclusively.

Another Symphony Tour was announced for the 2012 Christmas season, featuring Agnew, Lambe, Nesbitt and McFadden. The tour began on 1 December and continued on till 22 December.

In 2012, Méav Ní Mhaolchatha returned briefly to Celtic Woman to record Celtic Woman: Home for Christmas, the first time she had appeared with the group since her departure in 2007. She announced that she would return to the group again, temporarily, in August 2013 to film the Celtic Woman: Home for Christmas PBS show and DVD.

=== 2013–2014 ===
In July 2013, Celtic Woman released a promotional video on its YouTube channel for a new PBS special, due to be screened in early 2014. On 24 February 2014, Celtic Woman released a new CD/DVD set and PBS Special, called Celtic Woman: Emerald - Musical Gems. It features Lisa Lambe, Chloë Agnew, Máiréad Nesbitt, and Susan McFadden. The DVD was filmed in April 2013 at a tour stop in South Bend, Indiana and was aired on PBS, starting in March.

Celtic Woman took "Believe" on tour again from February to June 2013, with the same line-up. On 15 January 2013, Lisa Kelly announced her intentions to open "The Lisa Kelly Voice Academy", located in Peachtree City, Georgia, and confirmed that she would not be returning to Celtic Woman. Her husband, Scott Porter, also announced his departure as CEO of Celtic Woman.

On 5 August 2013, Chloë Agnew announced that she was taking a break from Celtic Woman to focus on solo projects. She was replaced by Derry-born singer Mairéad Carlin for the second "Believe" European tour.

Celtic Woman took "Believe" to Europe in October 2013 and visited the US on their Symphony Tour in December 2013. The lineup featured Carlin, McFadden, Lambe and Nesbitt. The Australian Tour for "Believe", previously scheduled for September 2013, was rescheduled to January 2014.

Celtic Woman toured in the US from February to June 2014 on their Emerald Tour to promote their new album called Celtic Woman: Emerald Musical Gems. Lynn Hilary came back for the Emerald Tour as Lisa Lambe left in mid-March for a role in the play Breaking Dad, Ross O'Carroll-Kelly's sequel to Between Foxrock and a Hard Place." As well as the US, Celtic Woman visited Brazil, the UK, and Europe in Autumn 2014 on their Emerald Tour, making their debut in Brazil and the UK.

Celtic Woman toured the US for their "Symphony Tour" in December 2014.

Shortly before the beginning of the Emerald Tour on 14 February 2014, management announced that Lisa Lambe would be leaving the tour at the beginning of March, with Lynn Hilary returning to take her place. Lambe was slated to return during the summer, though no specific date was given.

In late 2014, Lambe shared she would be leaving Celtic Woman for a while to work on a solo album. She announced that her departure was permanent in early 2015 to promote her solo album and tour. Lynn Hilary again returned and took Lambe's place. It was later announced both Hilary and Alex Sharpe would be returning for the Decade 10th Anniversary tour along with Méav.

=== 2015 ===
On 29 May 2015, the group released an album called Solo featuring ten of the former and current members. On 10 July 2015, the group released an album called Decade: The Songs, The Show, The Traditions, The Classics featuring all of the former and current members. The albums were released to commemorate the group's 10th Anniversary.

In August 2015, the group filmed a DVD / TV special and recorded an accompanying album called Celtic Woman: Destiny, the first for Mairéad Carlin and Éabha McMahon. Nesbitt was the only founding member on the album, although Méav Ní Mhaolchatha appeared and sang as a guest. Destiny was nominated for Best World Music Album at the 59th Annual Grammy Awards. This was the first Grammy nomination for the group.

They returned to the U.S. for their Decade 10th Anniversary Tour in March 2015 to celebrate the group's 10th anniversary. Their November 2014 Emerald European Tour was rescheduled to February 2015 and became part of the Decade 10th Anniversary Tour instead.

They visited Australia for the Decade 10th Anniversary Tour in September 2015 for the first time since January 2014 and returned to the UK in November 2015.

On 11 August 2015, it was announced that Éabha McMahon was joining Celtic Woman as a principal singer.

=== 2016–2018 ===
On 7 August 2016, it was announced that long-time member Máiréad Nesbitt was stepping away from Celtic Woman to focus on her own projects. Tara McNeill was announced as a new member of Celtic Woman. In August 2016, the group recorded an album called Celtic Woman: Voices of Angels. The album was the first to feature McNeill and marked the first to feature none of the founding members, although Méav Ní Mhaolchatha again appeared as a guest.

The Destiny World Tour was from 4 March – 29 October 2016.

The Voices of Angels World Tour was from 2 March – 2 November 2017.

Celtic Woman recorded a live album, Celtic Woman: Homecoming – Live from Ireland, at the 3Arena in Dublin on 2 September 2017. The album released in January 2018. It was the first album released by the group to consist entirely of live tracks.

On 19 July 2018, Celtic Woman announced a new TV special and DVD, to be recorded on 13–14 September 2018 at Johnstown Castle in Wexford, Ireland. This was the group's first outdoor TV special in nine years. The following day, the group announced a studio album to accompany the DVD. The DVD and album were named Ancient Land.

On 6 October 2017, Celtic Woman officially announced their 2018 tour, the Homecoming World Tour. The North American leg of the Homecoming Tour ran from 1 March 2018 – 17 June 2018.

On 31 July 2018, the group announced The Best of Christmas Tour, which ran from 26 November – 22 December 2018.

On 17 October 2018, the group announced the Ancient Land Tour, which ran from 28 February 2019 - 18 November 2019.

From 11 to 23 March 2018, McFadden took a leave from the Celtic Woman: Homecoming tour to attend to a family emergency. Sharpe temporarily took McFadden's place in the lineup. McFadden returned to the tour on 24 March 2018 and remained with the group until the end of the tour.

On 12 August 2018, it was announced that McFadden, expecting her first child, was taking a leave from the group. On 16 August 2018, Megan Walsh was announced as a new member of the group, taking McFadden's place. In October 2019, Susan McFadden returned for a few shows on the group's European Tour while Mairéad Carlin recovered from appendicitis.

=== 2019–2024 ===
Later releases included the holiday album The Magic of Christmas in 2019, Celebration: 15 Years of Music and Magic in 2020, Postcards from Ireland in 2021, and the EP Christmas Cards from Ireland in 2022.

In early 2020, Éabha McMahon left the group to pursue a solo career, and Chloë Agnew returned as a special guest artist for the group's Celebration 15th Anniversary Tour.

On 13 January 2021, Mairéad Carlin announced that she was leaving Celtic Woman. Muirgen O'Mahony joined the group in 2021, having been encouraged to audition by former member Susan McFadden. O’Mahony’s made her debut on the Postcards from Ireland album.

By December 2022, the performing line-up consisted of Tara McNeill, O'Mahony, Anúna singer Hannah Traynor and Megan Walsh for the Christmas Cards from Ireland tour.

For the 20th anniversary TV special and in 2023 and tour in 2024, the line-up was announced as Carlin, O'Mahony and McNeill, and former Riverdance dancer Emma Warren. Warren had joined Celtic Woman in April 2023.

=== 2025–present ===
In late 2025, Caitríona Sherlock was announced as a new vocalist in Celtic Woman's line-up and Ciara Ní Mhurchú as the group's fiddler. Sherlock is a sean-nós singer from Monaghan and multi All-Ireland Fleadh Cheoil champion who had performed worldwide with Téada, Anúna and Systir. Mhurchú is a member of fellow Irish band BIIRD. The two made their debut in the Nollaig symphony tour

In spring 2026, the A New Era North American tour cast was identified as Carlin, O'Mahony, Sherlock and new violinist Kate Heneghan.

In September 2026, member Mairéad Carlin departed from the group and was replaced by Armagh-born singer Eiméar Crealey.

== Members ==
Present members as of September 2026 are as follows:

- Eiméar Crealey
- Kate Heneghan
- Muirgen O'Mahony
- Caitríona Sherlock

Former members include:

- Chloë Agnew
- Mairéad Carlin
- Órla Fallon
- Lynn Hilary
- Lisa Kelly
- Lisa Lambe
- Susan McFadden
- Éabha McMahon
- Tara McNeill
- Méav Ní Mhaolchatha
- Ciara Ní Mhurcú
- Máiréad Nesbitt
- Deirdre Shannon
- Alex Sharpe
- Hannah Traynor
- Megan Walsh
- Emma Warren
- Hayley Westenra

=== Relationship ===
When asked how the group members got along, founding former member Lisa Kelly responded,

"We get along because we're so different. Chloë Agnew is hip, Méav Ní Mhaolchatha is rational, Órla Fallon is angelic, and Máiréad Nesbitt is energetic."

According to Chloë Agnew, the friendship among the vocalists was the number one question they were asked. She explained:

"I think people are always looking for a 'Desperate Housewives' story, that they all hate each other and nobody actually gets along. It's all for show. And the truth of the matter is, it's not. The reality is we do all get along. The five of us are like sisters, best friends."

== Awards and honours ==
In 2007, Celtic Woman won an EBBA Award. Each year the European Border Breakers Awards (EBBA) recognize the success of ten emerging artists or groups who reached audiences outside their own countries with their first internationally released album in the past year. Celtic Woman: Destiny received a nomination for the 59th (2017) Grammy Awards in the "Best World Music Album" category.

== Discography ==
Title	Album details	Peak chart positions				Certifications
Title	Album details	AUS	UK	US	JPN	Certifications
Celtic Woman	Released: 1 March 2005; Formats: CD, DVD; Region: International	55		53		ARIA: Gold (CD); ARIA: Platinum (DVD)
A Christmas Celebration	Released: 3 October 2006; Formats: CD, DVD; Region: International			35		
A New Journey	Released: 30 January 2007; Formats: CD, DVD; Region: International	68		4		ARIA: Platinum (DVD)
A Celtic Family Christmas	Released: 14 October 2008; Formats: CD; Region: United States					
The Greatest Journey	Released: 28 October 2008; Formats: CD, DVD; Region: International			75		
Songs from the Heart	26 January 2010; Formats: CD, DVD; Region: International	48	122	9		ARIA: Platinum (DVD)
Lullaby	15 February 2011; Formats: CD; Region: International			126		
Believe (compilation)	25 May 2011; Formats: CD; Region: Japan			13		
An Irish Journey	3 October 2011; Formats: CD; Region: Europe					
A Celtic Christmas	25 November 2011; Formats: CD; Region: Europe					
Believe	24 January 2012; Formats: CD, DVD; Region: International (except Japan)					
Home for Christmas	9 October 2012; Formats: CD, DVD, Blu-ray; Region: International			43		
Silent Night	9 October 2012; Formats: CD; Region: United States					
Emerald – Musical Gems	24 February 2014; Formats: CD, DVD, Blu-ray; Region: International			28		
O Christmas Tree	21 October 2014; Formats: CD; Region: United States					
Solo	29 May 2015; Formats: CD; Region: International					
Decade: The Songs, The Show, The Traditions, The Classics	10 July 2015; Formats: CD; Region: International					
Destiny	23 October 2015; Formats: CD, DVD, Blu-ray; Region: International, Germany			60		
Christmas	6 November 2015; Formats: CD; Region: Europe					
Voices of Angels	18 November 2016; Formats: CD; Region: International					
The Best of Christmas	24 November 2017; Formats: CD; Region: International					
Homecoming – Live from Ireland	25 November 2017; Formats: CD, DVD; Region: International					
Ancient Land	28 September 2018; Formats: CD, DVD, Blu-ray; Region: International					
The Magic of Christmas	25 October 2019; Formats: CD; Region: International					
Celebration: 15 Years of Music and Magic	27 February 2020; Formats: CD, DVD; Region: International					
Postcards from Ireland	29 October 2021; Formats: CD, DVD; Region: International					
Christmas Cards from Ireland (EP)	4 November 2022; Formats: Digital; Region: International					
20	26 January 2024; Formats: CD, DVD, LP; Region: International					
Nollaig - A Christmas Journey	7 November 2025; Format: CD; Region: International					

== Tours ==
1. Celtic Woman: The Show (2005–2006)
2. A New Journey Tour (2007–2008)
3. Isle of Hope Tour (2009)
4. Songs from the Heart Tour (2010–2011)
5. A Christmas Celebration: The Symphony Tour (2011)
6. Believe Tour (2012–2013)
7. Home for Christmas Tour (2012–2016)
8. Emerald – Musical Gems Tour (2014)
9. 10th Anniversary Tour (2015)
10. Destiny Tour (2016)
11. Voices of Angels World Tour (2017–2018)
12. Homecoming Tour (2018)
13. The Best of Christmas Tour (2018)
14. Ancient Land Tour (2019)
15. The Magic of Christmas Tour (2019)
16. Celebration: 15th Anniversary Tour (2020) - cut short due to the COVID-19 pandemic
17. Postcards from Ireland Tour (2022)
18. A Christmas Symphony Tour (2022–2023)
19. 20th Anniversary Tour (2024)

== See also ==
- List of Irish Grammy Award winners and nominees
