= Home for Christmas (Celtic Woman album) =

Celtic Woman: Home for Christmas

Studio album by Celtic Woman
- Released: 9 October 2012
- Recorded: July–August 2012
- Studios: STUDIOTWO, Dublin, Ireland
- Genres: Celtic, new-age, classical, Christmas
- Languages: English, Latin
- Label: Manhattan Records
- Producer: David Downes

Celtic Woman chronology
Celtic Woman: Believe (2011)	Celtic Woman: Home for Christmas (2012)	Celtic Woman: Silent Night (2012)

Celtic Woman: Home for Christmas is the eighth studio album released by the group Celtic Woman, released on 9 October 2012. It is the third Christmas album released by the group, but only the second available for international purchase.

Home for Christmas features vocalists Chloë Agnew, Lisa Lambe, Méav Ní Mhaolchatha, and fiddler Máiréad Nesbitt. This is the first album to feature Ní Mhaolchatha since her departure from the group in 2007 following the release of the DVD and PBS special accompanying the group's first Christmas album, A Christmas Celebration. It is also the first album not to feature founding member Lisa Kelly, who was at the time on maternity leave (though she appears on the bonus track included with the Japanese edition of the album).

== Track listing ==
CD
No.	Title	Performer(s)	Length
1.	"I'll Be Home for Christmas"	Lisa Lambe	4:12
2.	"Hark! The Herald Angels Sing"	Chloë Agnew, Lambe, Máiréad Nesbitt, Méav Ní Mhaolchatha	5:01
3.	"Santa Claus Is Coming to Town"	Agnew, Nesbitt	4:13
4.	"Silent Night"	Ní Mhaolchatha	3:35
5.	"We Three Kings"	Agnew, Lambe, Ní Mhaolchatha	3:37
6.	"We Wish You a Merry Christmas"	Agnew, Lambe, Nesbitt, Ní Mhaolchatha	3:37
7.	"What Child Is This?"	Nesbitt, Ní Mhaolchatha	4:31
8.	"Adeste Fideles (O Come, All Ye Faithful)"	Agnew	4:20
9.	"Winter Wonderland"	Agnew, Lambe, Nesbitt, Ní Mhaolchatha	2:51
10.	"Mary's Boy Child"	Agnew, Lambe, Ní Mhaolchatha	3:07
11.	"Auld Lang Syne"	Lambe	3:27
12.	"Joy to the World"	Agnew, Lambe, Nesbitt, Ní Mhaolchatha	2:55

Bonus tracks on special edition
No.	Title	Performer(s)	Length
13.	"The First Tree in the Greenwood (The Sans Day Carol)"	Agnew, Lambe, Nesbitt, Ní Mhaolchatha	3:24
14.	"An Angel"	Agnew, Lambe, Nesbitt	3:36
15.	"In the Bleak Midwinter"	Ní Mhaolchatha	3:30
16.	"There Must Be an Angel (Playing with My Heart)"	Agnew, Lambe, Nesbitt	4:29

Bonus track on Japanese edition
No.	Title	Performer(s)	Length
13.	"You Raise Me Up" (Inori Version; featuring Hiroko Yakushimaru)	Agnew, Lisa Kelly, Lambe, Nesbitt	4:39

== PBS special, DVD and Blu-ray release background ==
The accompanying concert special to the album, entitled Home for Christmas: Live from Dublin, was recorded live at the Helix Theatre in Dublin, Ireland on 7 August 2013 in front of an invited audience. Unlike the album, the line-up of performers was slightly different; former member Chloë Agnew announced prior to the recording of the special that she would be leaving Celtic Woman to focus on solo projects. Since a replacement for Agnew wasn't announced beforehand, Méav Ní Mhaolchatha again returned to take her place with current members Lisa Lambe, Susan McFadden, and Máiréad Nesbitt, for the recording of the special.

The album was re-released on 29 October 2013 in a combo pack containing a DVD copy of the concert, while separate DVD and Blu-ray copies were also issued on the same day. The DVD and Blu-ray releases also include four bonus tracks recorded as part of an acoustic session in the venue prior to the concert with pianist and musical director David Downes.

=== DVD and Blu-ray track listing ===
No.	Title	Performer(s)	Length
1.	"Winter Wonderland"	Lisa Lambe, Susan McFadden, Máiréad Nesbitt, Méav Ní Mhaolchatha	3:22
2.	"What Child is This?"	Nesbitt, Ní Mhaolchatha	4:29
3.	"We Wish You a Merry Christmas"	Lambe, McFadden, Nesbitt, Ní Mhaolchatha	3:22
4.	"I'll Be Home for Christmas"	Lambe	4:13
5.	"Hark! The Herald Angels Sing"	Lambe, McFadden, Nesbitt, Ní Mhaolchatha	4:39
6.	"Santa Claus is Coming to Town"	McFadden, Nesbitt	3:40
7.	"We Three Kings"	Lambe, McFadden, Ní Mhaolchatha	3:31
8.	"Carol of the Bells"	Nesbitt	2:16
9.	"O Tannenbaum"	Lambe, McFadden, Ní Mhaolchatha	4:01
10.	"Silent Night"	Ní Mhaolchatha	3:31
11.	"It's Beginning to Look a Lot Like Christmas"	Lambe, McFadden, Ní Mhaolchatha	2:57
12.	"The Light of Christmas Morn"	Lambe, Nesbitt, Ní Mhaolchatha	2:57
13.	"It Came Upon a Midnight Clear"	McFadden	4:12
14.	"Auld Lang Syne"	Lambe	2:38
15.	"Joy to the World"	Lambe, McFadden, Nesbitt, Ní Mhaolchatha	3:18

Bonus tracks
No.	Title	Performer(s)	Length
1.	"Away in a Manger"	Lambe
2.	"The Christmas Song"	McFadden
3.	"In the Bleak Midwinter"	Ní Mhaolchatha
4.	"Have Yourself a Merry Little Christmas"	Lambe, McFadden, Nesbitt, Ní Mhaolchatha

== Personnel ==
Per the liner notes:
Featured performers

- Chloë Agnew – vocals
- Lisa Kelly – vocals (Japanese edition only)
- Lisa Lambe – vocals
- Máiréad Nesbitt – fiddle
- Méav Ní Mhaolchatha – vocals

Musicians

- David Downes – grand piano, whistles, uilleann pipes, percussion, keyboards, orchestrations, choral arrangements, programming
- Anthony Byrne – bagpipes
- Andrew Boland – buann-xa-perqua

The Irish Film Orchestra

- Caitríona Walsh – orchestra contractor
- John Page – conductor
- Therese Timoney – concertmaster
- Martin Johnston – solo cello
- David Agnew – cor anglais

Irish Philharmonic Choir

- Paul McGough – choral contractor
- David Leigh – choral director

Production

- Produced and arranged by David Downes
- Engineered and mixed by Andrew Boland (additional engineering by David Downes)
- Recorded and mixed at STUDIOTWO, Dublin, Ireland
- Orchestra and choir recorded at RTÉ STUDIO ONE, Dublin, Ireland
- Mastered by Ray Staff at Air Lyndhurst, London, United Kingdom
- Bonus tracks mastered by Kevin Bartley at Capitol Mastering, Hollywood, California, United States

== Charts ==
The album was officially certified Platinum around 7 March 2013.

Chart (2012)	Peak position
Swiss Albums (Schweizer Hitparade)	16
US Billboard 200	43
US Top Holiday Albums (Billboard)	2
US World Albums (Billboard)	1
