= An Irish Journey =

Celtic Woman: An Irish Journey

Compilation album by Celtic Woman
- Released: 3 October 2011 (French release)
- Genre: Celtic, new-age, adult contemporary, classical
- Language: English, Irish
- Label: Manhattan
- Producer: David Downes

Celtic Woman chronology
Believe (2011)	Celtic Woman: An Irish Journey (2011)	A Celtic Christmas (2011)

Celtic Woman: An Irish Journey is a greatest hits album by the group Celtic Woman, released on 3 October 2011. This album was released exclusively in France.

Performers in An Irish Journey are vocalists Chloë Agnew, Lisa Kelly, Lisa Lambe, Órla Fallon, Méav Ní Mhaolchatha, Hayley Westenra, Lynn Hilary, Alex Sharpe, and fiddler Máiréad Nesbitt. All songs were taken from previous releases, which makes this album one of only a few that feature all members (current and previous). The only new song is The Water is Wide, which is performed by Kelly, Agnew, Lambe, and Nesbitt. Another version of this song would later be released in Celtic Woman: Believe (the 2012 international release), performed by Kelly and Nesbitt only.

Lisa Kelly gave an interview about the album, saying "The songs are very specific to this album, and it definitely reflects the name of it. When you throw in songs, like 'This Isle Of Innisfree' and 'Galway Bay,' you give people a glimpse of where you come from, and how beautiful Ireland actually is. And then we've got the more modern Irish songs with 'You Raise Me Up' and 'The Voice,' and then you've got the reliable and the beautiful 'Danny Boy,' which I think people really expect to hear from you. So it was definitely in the heading of the album, called 'An Irish Journey.' I think this really does reflect what it is."

David Downes also gave an interview about the album, saying “We’ve recorded ‘The Water Is Wide' with the fabulous bagad Lann-Bihoué, and it’s an interesting collaboration because when I was 19 I toured with Alan Stivell, famous breton musician, and I worked with Dan Ar Braz, also kind of famous breton musician, and a lot of Celtic Woman musicians and our engineer, Andrew Boland, have worked in the past with the bagad Lann-Bihoué and with many musicians over there. So it seemed like a very natural collaboration. We’re kind of brothers-in-arms, I suppose, so we all really just thought this would be a great idea. The bagad is so fantastic, and the opportunity is great for us to get to work with them.”

== Track listing ==
No.	Title	Performer(s)	Length
1.	"The Water is Wide" (featuring Bagad de Lann-Bihoué)	Lisa Kelly, Chloë Agnew, Lisa Lambe, Máiréad Nesbitt	3:31
2.	"The Coast Of Galiçia"	Nesbitt	3:36
3.	"Harry's Game" (from Harry's Game)	Órla Fallon	2:31
4.	"Dúlaman"	Méav Ní Mhaolchatha	3:06
5.	"Amazing Grace"	Kelly, Agnew, Lynn Hilary, Alex Sharpe	4:57
6.	"Danny Boy"	Ní Mhaolchatha	3:26
7.	"Níl Sé'n Lá"	Kelly, Agnew, Hilary, Sharpe, Nesbitt	3:36
8.	"Isle Of Innisfree" (from The Quiet Man)	Fallon	3:27
9.	"Granuaile's Dance"	Nesbitt	3:41
10.	"Galway Bay"	Agnew	4:14
11.	"Mo Ghile Mear"	Kelly, Agnew, Nesbitt, Fallon, Ní Mhaolchatha, Hayley Westenra	5:07
12.	"The Voice"	Kelly, Nesbitt	3:08
13.	"At The Céilí" (Live from Slane Castle)	Kelly, Ní Mhaolchatha, Fallon, Nesbitt	5:00
14.	"You Raise Me Up"	Kelly, Agnew, Nesbitt, Fallon, Hilary	4:41
15.	"Spanish Lady" (Live from Slane Castle)	Kelly, Agnew, Fallon, Ní Mhaolchatha, Westenra	2:23

=== Notes ===
- Tracks 2, 5, 7 and 10 were originally released on the album Songs from the Heart.
- Tracks 3, 6 and 8 were originally released on the original Celtic Woman album.
- Tracks 4, 9, 11, 12, 13 and 15 were originally released on the album A New Journey.
- Track 14 was originally released on the compilation album The Greatest Journey: The Essential Collection.
