= A Celtic Christmas =

Celtic Woman: A Celtic Christmas

Compilation album by Celtic Woman
- Released: 25 November 2011 (German release)
- Genre: Celtic, new-age, adult contemporary, classical
- Language: English, Irish, Latin
- Label: Manhattan
- Producer: David Downes

Celtic Woman chronology
Celtic Woman: An Irish Journey (2011)	Celtic Woman: A Celtic Christmas (2011)	Celtic Woman: Believe (2012)

Celtic Woman: A Celtic Christmas is an album by the group Celtic Woman, released on 25 November 2011. This album was released exclusively in Germany.

Performers in A Celtic Christmas are vocalists Chloë Agnew, Lisa Kelly, Lisa Lambe, Órla Fallon, Méav Ní Mhaolchatha, Lynn Hilary, and fiddler Máiréad Nesbitt. Most songs were taken from previous releases (Celtic Woman: A Christmas Celebration and Celtic Woman: Lullaby), and this album is the third Christmas-themed one to be released by the group. New songs in this album include An Angel and There Must Be An Angel, as well as two live recordings from the Helix Theatre, Dublin, Ireland.

== Track listing ==
No.	Title	Performer(s)	Length
1.	"An Angel"	Chloë Agnew, Lisa Lambe, Máiréad Nesbitt	3:36
2.	"There Must Be An Angel (Playing With My Heart)"	Agnew, Lambe, Nesbitt	4:30
3.	"O Holy Night"	Agnew, Órla Fallon, Lisa Kelly, Nesbitt, Méav Ní Mhaolchatha	4:26
4.	"Ding Dong Merrily On High"	Agnew, Fallon, Kelly, Nesbitt, Ní Mhaolchatha	2:47
5.	"Away in a Manger"	Fallon	2:32
6.	"White Christmas"	Agnew, Kelly, Ní Mhaolchatha	3:22
7.	"Silent Night"	Nesbitt, Ní Mhaolchatha	3:26
8.	"Have Yourself A Merry Little Christmas"	Agnew, Fallon, Kelly, Nesbitt, Ní Mhaolchatha	2:28
9.	"O Come All Ye Faithful"	Agnew, Fallon, Kelly, Nesbitt, Ní Mhaolchatha	3:52
10.	"The Little Drummer Boy"	Agnew, Fallon	3:48
11.	"Stay Awake"	Agnew, Lynn Hilary, Kelly, Nesbitt	3:22
12.	"Suantraí"	Hilary	3:19
13.	"Walking In The Air"	Agnew	3:30
14.	"When You Wish Upon A Star"	Kelly, Nesbitt	3:16
15.	"Baby Mine"	Agnew	3:10
16.	"Hush Little Baby"	Kelly	0:51
17.	"Harry's Game" (Live from the Helix, Dublin, Ireland)	Fallon	2:31
18.	"Ave Maria" (Live from the Helix, Dublin, Ireland)	Agnew, Fallon (harp)	2:53

== Charts ==
Chart (2011)	Peak position
German Albums (Offizielle Top 100)	43
