= A Celtic Family Christmas =

Celtic Woman: A Celtic Christmas

Compilation album by Celtic Woman
- Released: 14 October 2008
- Genre: Celtic, new-age, adult contemporary, classical
- Language: English, Irish, Latin
- Label: Manhattan
- Producer: David Downes

Celtic Woman chronology
Celtic Woman: The Greatest Journey (2008)	Celtic Woman: A Celtic Christmas (2008)	Celtic Woman: Songs from the Heart (2010)

Celtic Woman: A Celtic Family Christmas is a collaborative album by the group Celtic Woman and The High Kings, released on 14 October 2008.

Performers in A Celtic Family Christmas are vocalists Chloë Agnew, Lisa Kelly, Órla Fallon, Méav Ní Mhaolchatha, and fiddler Máiréad Nesbitt. It is the second Christmas-themed album to be released by the group, with all newly recorded songs. This album's version of "Carol of the Bells" features the main vocalists, unlike the original release in Celtic Woman: A Christmas Celebration, where only Máiréad Nesbitt performed. The DVD release of A Christmas Celebration shows the only recorded performances of the songs in this album, except for the last three tracks.

== Track listing ==
No.	Title	Performer(s)	Length
1.	"Carol of the Bells"	Chloë Agnew, Órla Fallon, Lisa Kelly, Máiréad Nesbitt, Méav Ní Mhaolchatha	3:36
2.	"The First Noel"	Agnew, Fallon, Kelly, Mhaolchatha	3:55
3.	"In The Bleak Midwinter"	Nesbitt	2:43
4.	"Jesu Joy of Man's Desiring"	Agnew, Fallon, Nesbitt, Ní Mhaolchatha	4:13
5.	"Driving Home for Christmas"	The High Kings	3:31
6.	"Santa Claus is Coming to Town"	The High Kings	3:35

== Charts ==
Chart (2008)	Peak position
US Top Holiday Albums (Billboard)	20
US World Albums (Billboard)	1
