= Walking in the Air (Chloë Agnew album) =

Studio album by Chloë Agnew
- Released: 2004 (Ireland); 2006 (United States)
- Recorded: 2003
- Genre: Celtic
- Labels: Celtic Collections; Manhattan Records
- Producer: David Downes

Walking in the Air is an album by Chloë Agnew first released in 2004 under the Celtic Collections label.

In contrast with those from Agnew's fellow Celtic Woman members Órla Fallon, Lisa Kelly, Máiréad Nesbitt, and Méav Ní Mhaolchatha, the album was re-released in the United States in 2006 under the Manhattan Records-licensed "Celtic Woman Presents" label.

== Track listing ==
No.	Title	Writer(s)	Length
1.	"Walking in the Air" (from The Snowman)	Howard Blake	3:38
2.	"The Prayer" (from Quest for Camelot)	David Foster, Carole Bayer Sager, Alberto Testa, Tony Renis	4:22
3.	"Nella Fantasia" (featuring David Agnew)	Ennio Morricone, Chiara Ferraù	3:42
4.	"Someday" (from The Hunchback of Notre Dame)	Alan Menken, Stephen Schwartz	4:22
5.	"Rain"	Antonio Vivaldi, David Downes	2:13
6.	"Going Home"	Antonin Dvořák, David Downes	4:07
7.	"Panis Angelicus"	César Franck	3:58
8.	"Vincent (Starry, Starry Night)"	Don McLean	4:37
9.	"Jesu, Joy of Man's Desiring"	Johann Sebastian Bach, Martin Janus	4:45
10.	"To Where You Are"	Richard Marx, Linda Thompson	3:55
11.	"One World"	David Downes, Shay Healy	3:49
12.	"Sigma"	David Agnew, Rolf Løvland	3:58
13.	"Winter Light"	Eric Kaz, Linda Ronstadt, Zbigniew Preisner	3:36
14.	"Brahms' Lullaby"	Johannes Brahms, Giscard Rasquin	2:20
15.	"Gabriel's Oboe" (bonus track, performed by David Agnew)	Ennio Morricone	2:26
