= Lullaby (Celtic Woman album) =

Celtic Woman: Lullaby

Compilation album by Celtic Woman
- Released: 15 February 2011
- Recorded: 2004–2010
- Genre: Celtic, new-age, adult contemporary, classical
- Language: English, Irish
- Label: Manhattan
- Producer: David Downes

Celtic Woman chronology
Celtic Woman: Songs from the Heart (2010)	Celtic Woman: Lullaby (2011)	Celtic Woman: Believe (2011)

Lullaby is the sixth studio album by the group Celtic Woman, released on 15 February 2011. This album was originally released exclusively through donations made to PBS stations in the United States back in November 2010 to support broadcasts of the group's Songs from the Heart television special.

Performers in Lullaby are vocalists Chloë Agnew, Lynn Hilary, Lisa Kelly, Órla Fallon, Méav Ní Mhaolchatha, Hayley Westenra, and fiddler Máiréad Nesbitt. This is the second album where members both current and previous appear together, the first being The Greatest Journey.

The inspiration for this album came from fans who loved the lullaby-themed songs performed by the group. Some songs are new recordings and appear in films such as Pinocchio and Mary Poppins while some, such as "Goodnight My Angel", "Over the Rainbow", and "Walking in the Air", are re-releases from the group's previous albums.

== Track listing ==
No.	Title	Performer(s)	Length
1.	"When You Wish Upon a Star"	Lisa Kelly, Máiréad Nesbitt	3:17
2.	"Stay Awake"	Chloë Agnew, Lynn Hilary, Kelly, Nesbitt	3:22
3.	"Baby Mine"	Agnew	3:10
4.	"Goodnight My Angel"	Agnew, Hilary, Kelly	3:14
5.	"Over the Rainbow"	Agnew, Órla Fallon, Méav Ní Mhaolchatha, Hayley Westenra	2:38
6.	"Suantraí"	Hilary	3:19
7.	"Walking in the Air"	Agnew	3:29
8.	"The Blessing"	Kelly	3:51
9.	"Brahms' Lullaby"	Agnew	2:18
10.	"Hush Little Baby"	Kelly	0:50

Notes

- On track 3, the bridge and third verse of the song are additionally edited by Agnew.
- Track 4 was originally released on the album Songs from the Heart.
- Tracks 5 and 8 were originally released on the album A New Journey.
- Track 7 is an edited version of the track originally released on the group's self-titled debut album.

== Chart history ==
Chart (2011)	Peak position
US Billboard 200	126
US World Albums (Billboard)	1
