= Songs from the Heart (Celtic Woman album) =

Celtic Woman: Songs from the Heart

Studio album by Celtic Woman
- Released: 16 January 2010
- Recorded: July 2009
- Studio: Windmill Lane Studios 1 & 2, StudioTWO and RTÉ Studio 1, Dublin, Ireland
- Genre: Celtic, new-age, vocal, classical
- Language: English, Irish, Latin, Italian
- Label: Manhattan
- Producer: David Downes

Celtic Woman chronology
Celtic Woman: The Greatest Journey (2008)	Celtic Woman: Songs from the Heart (2010)	Celtic Woman: Lullaby (2011)

Songs from the Heart is the fifth studio album and fourth on-stage production by all-female Irish musical ensemble Celtic Woman, released on 16 January 2010.

Performers in Songs from the Heart are vocalists Chloë Agnew, Lynn Hilary, Lisa Kelly, Alex Sharpe and fiddler Máiréad Nesbitt. The German deluxe edition, released in January 2011, also features newer member (at the time) Lisa Lambe, as well as former members Órla Fallon and Méav Ní Mhaolchatha.

== PBS special and DVD release background ==
Songs from the Heart was originally filmed as a TV special for American broadcaster PBS, as well as a DVD release, at Powerscourt House and Gardens near Enniskerry, County Wicklow, Ireland, in July 2009. The concert was filmed by Alex Coletti Productions and Brennus Productions with editing by the Windmill Lane Post Production studios in Dublin.

Like its predecessor A New Journey, the show was delayed by rain days before taking place; it also rained the day before, 'washing out' the rehearsals and forcing the performers to rehearse inside the main hall in the Powerscourt House. The concert was further delayed when the electrical generator powering the lights, cameras, and other electrical equipment failed during the song "Goodnight My Angel," requiring the show to stop while a second generator was sent for. The first generator was later fixed, allowing the show to continue with a restart of said song.

The DVD release and PBS special do not reprise the full concert, which composer and director David Downes mentioned was over two hours long. As the group did not have the rights to show all of the tracks performed during the recording of the PBS special and DVD release, the actual concert as shown was over one hour in length. Omitted songs that were performed included "Carolina Rua" and "You'll Be in My Heart".

The DVD also includes a 20-minute 'making-of' featurette showing the lead-up to the first show, starting three days before, where former CEO of the group Scott Porter mentions that Powerscourt was 'one of the most beautiful and challenging locations we've ever performed in'.

== Track listing ==
CD
No.	Title	Performer(s)	Length
1.	"Fields of Gold"	Lisa Kelly	3:49
2.	"Amazing Grace"	Chloë Agnew, Lynn Hilary, Kelly, Máiréad Nesbitt, Alex Sharpe	4:58
3.	"Níl Sé'n Lá"	Agnew, Hilary, Kelly, Nesbitt, Sharpe	3:35
4.	"My Lagan Love"	Hilary	2:53
5.	"When You Believe"	Agnew	4:31
6.	"The New Ground / Isle of Hope, Isle of Tears"	Agnew, Hilary, Kelly, Nesbitt, Sharpe	6:41
7.	"The Coast of Galiçia"	Nesbitt	3:38
8.	"Non c'è piú"	Agnew, Hilary, Kelly, Nesbitt, Sharpe	4:48
9.	"The Moon's a Harsh Mistress"	Kelly, Nesbitt	3:17
10.	"You'll Be in My Heart"	Sharpe	4:03
11.	"Goodnight My Angel"	Agnew, Hilary, Kelly	3:15
12.	"Galway Bay"	Agnew	4:17
13.	"The Lost Rose Fantasia"	Nesbitt	2:19
14.	"O, America!"	Agnew, Hilary, Kelly, Nesbitt, Sharpe	3:47

Notes

- All songs arranged by David Downes. Downes also wrote and composed "The New Ground" from track 6 and track 13.
- Track 14 was written and composed especially for Celtic Woman by Brendan Graham and William Joseph.
- Track 5 was released as a single on iTunes in November 2009, around the same period of the broadcast of the PBS special.

Bonus tracks on deluxe edition
No.	Title	Performer(s)	Length
15.	"The Call" (Live from Powerscourt House and Gardens)	Agnew, Hilary, Kelly, Nesbitt, Sharpe	5:28
16.	"Finale / Mo Ghile Mear" (Live from Powerscourt House and Gardens)	Agnew, Hilary, Kelly, Nesbitt, Sharpe	3:18

Additional bonus tracks on amazon.com digital download edition
No.	Title	Performer(s)	Length
17.	"Carolina Rua"	Hilary, Nesbitt	3:27
18.	"Danny Boy" (Live from Powerscourt House and Gardens)	Agnew, Hilary, Kelly, Sharpe	3:23

Bonus tracks on Japanese edition
No.	Title	Performer(s)	Length
15.	"Pie Jesu" (Live from Powerscourt House and Gardens)	Agnew, Hilary, Nesbitt	3:37
16.	"You Raise Me Up" (Live from Powerscourt House and Gardens)	Agnew, Hilary, Kelly, Nesbitt, Sharpe	5:31

Bonus tracks on German edition
No.	Title	Performer(s)	Length
14.	"Forever Young"	Kelly, Nesbitt	3:57
15.	"A Spaceman Came Travelling"	Lisa Lambe	3:49
16.	"Wenn Du in Meinen Träumen Bei Mir Bist" (German version of "Over the Rainbow")	Agnew, Kelly, Lambe, Nesbitt	2:41
17.	"Symphonie" (omitted from later editions)	Agnew, Nesbitt	4:20
18.	"O Come All Ye Faithful" (from the album A Christmas Celebration)	Agnew, Órla Fallon, Kelly, Nesbitt, Méav Ní Mhaolchatha	3:51

DVD
No.	Title	Performer(s)	Length
1.	"The Call"	Agnew, Hilary, Kelly, Nesbitt, Sharpe, Extreme Rhythm Drummers
2.	"Fields of Gold"	Kelly
3.	"When You Believe"	Agnew
4.	"The Coast of Galiçia"	Nesbitt
5.	"The New Ground / Isle of Hope, Isle of Tears"	Agnew, Hilary, Kelly, Sharpe
6.	"Non C'è Piú"	Agnew, Hilary, Kelly, Nesbitt, Sharpe
7.	"True Colors"	Nesbitt, Sharpe
8.	"Galway Bay"	Agnew
9.	"Goodnight My Angel"	Agnew, Hilary, Kelly
10.	"O, America!"	Agnew, Hilary, Kelly, Nesbitt, Sharpe, Discovery Gospel Choir
11.	"Níl Sé'n Lá"	Agnew, Hilary, Kelly, Nesbitt, Sharpe
12.	"The Lost Rose Fantasia"	Nesbitt
13.	"The Moon's a Harsh Mistress"	Kelly, Nesbitt
14.	"My Lagan Love"	Hilary
15.	"Amazing Grace"	Agnew, Hilary, Kelly, Sharpe, Black Raven Pipe Band
16.	"Pie Jesu"	Agnew, Hilary, Nesbitt
17.	"Slumber My Darling / The Mason's Apron"	Nesbitt
18.	"Danny Boy"	Agnew, Hilary, Kelly, Sharpe
19.	"You Raise Me Up"	Agnew, Hilary, Kelly, Nesbitt, Sharpe, Discovery Gospel Choir
20.	"Finale / Mo Ghile Mear"	Agnew, Hilary, Kelly, Nesbitt, Sharpe, Black Raven Pipe Band, Extreme Rhythm Drummers

== Personnel ==
Celtic Woman

- Chloë Agnew – vocals
- Lynn Hilary – vocals
- Lisa Kelly – vocals
- Máiréad Nesbitt – fiddle
- Alex Sharpe – vocals

Band

- David Downes – grand piano, keyboards, whistles, percussion, backing vocals
- Russell Powell - cello
- Des Moore – guitar, bouzouki
- Eoghan O'Neill – bass guitar
- Tommy Martin – uilleann pipes, whistles
- Ray Fean – drums, percussion
- Nicky Bailey – percussion
- Anthony Byrne – bagpipes
- Andrew Boland – pièna-flörten

Irish Film Orchestra

- John Page – conductor
- Alan Smale – concertmaster
- Martin Johnston – solo cello

Aontas Choral Ensemble

- Rosemary Collier – choral director

Black Raven Pipe Band

- Paul Russell – pipe major

Production

- David Downes – producer, arranger, orchestrator, additional engineering
- Andrew Boland – engineering, mixing
- Caroline Nesbitt – sleeve design
- Lili Forberg, Laurel Fisher, Joe Kelly – photography
- Recorded at Windmill Lane Studios 1 & 2, StudioTWO and RTÉ Studio 1, Dublin, Ireland
- Mixed in StudioTWO, Dublin, Ireland
- Mastered by Mazen Murad at Metropolis Studios, London

== Charts ==
=== Weekly charts ===
Chart (2010–2011)	Peak position
Australian Albums (ARIA)	48
Austrian Albums (Ö3 Austria)	20
Belgian Albums (Ultratop Flanders)	30
Dutch Albums (Album Top 100)	34
German Albums (Offizielle Top 100)	9
Swiss Albums (Schweizer Hitparade)	2
US Billboard 200	9
US World Albums (Billboard)	1

=== Year-end charts ===
Chart (2010)	Position
US Billboard 200	195
US World Albums (Billboard)	1

Chart (2011)	Position
Swiss Albums (Schweizer Hitparade)	7
US World Albums (Billboard)	3

== Certifications ==
Region	Certification	Certified units/sales
Australia (ARIA)	Platinum	15,000^{^}
Canada (Music Canada) dvd	Gold	5,000^{^}
Switzerland (IFPI Switzerland)	Platinum	30,000^{^}
^{^} Shipments figures based on certification alone.
