= A Celtic Journey =

Studio album by Méav
- Released: 10 January 2006
- Genre: Celtic
- Length: 45:23
- Label: EMI-Manhattan
- Producers: David Downes; David Agnew

Méav chronology
Silver Sea (2002)	A Celtic Journey (2006)	Celtic Dreams (2006)

A Celtic Journey is an album by Méav Ní Mhaolchatha. It was released in 2006 by EMI-Manhattan.

== Track listing ==
No.	Title	Length
1.	"She Moved Through the Fair"	4:06
2.	"The Last Rose Of Summer"	4:42
3.	"Down By the Sally Gardens"	3:53
4.	"I Dreamt I Dwelt in Marble Halls"	3:48
5.	"Celtic Prayer"	4:16
6.	"Suantraí"	4:59
7.	"Danny Boy"	3:19
8.	"Greensleeves"	3:16
9.	"Dante’s Prayer"	5:34
10.	"Goltraí"	5:34
11.	"Silent Night"	3:40
Total length:		45:23

== Personnel ==
Musicians

- David Agnew - Oboe, recorder
- David Downes - Keyboards, uilleann pipes, whistle
- Andreja Malir - Harp
- Méav - Vocals

Technical

- David Agnew - Producer
- Bobby Boughton - Engineer
- David Downes - Producer
- Tony Harris - Engineer
- Brian Masterson - Engineer
- Bill Somerville-Large - Engineer
