= The Greatest Journey =

Celtic Woman: The Greatest Journey - Essential Collection

Compilation album by Celtic Woman
- Released: 28 October 2008
- Genre: Celtic, new-age, adult contemporary, classical
- Language: English, Irish, Latin
- Label: Manhattan
- Producer: David Downes

Celtic Woman chronology
Celtic Woman: A New Journey (2007)	Celtic Woman: The Greatest Journey - Essential Collection (2008)	Celtic Woman: Songs from the Heart (2010)

Celtic Woman: The Greatest Journey is a compilation album by the group Celtic Woman, released on 28 October 2008. It features tracks from their self-titled debut album and A New Journey (despite some having been re-recorded), plus three new tracks.

Performers in The Greatest Journey are vocalists Chloë Agnew, Órla Fallon, Lynn Hilary, Lisa Kelly, Méav Ní Mhaolchatha, Alex Sharpe, Hayley Westenra and fiddler Máiréad Nesbitt.

== Track listing ==
CD
No.	Title	Performer(s)	Length
1.	"The Call"	Chloë Agnew, Órla Fallon, Lynn Hilary, Lisa Kelly, Máiréad Nesbitt, Alex Sharpe	4:19
2.	"Pie Jesu"	Agnew, Nesbitt, Hilary	3:31
3.	"You Raise Me Up"	Agnew, Fallon, Hilary, Kelly, Nesbitt	4:42
4.	"Harry's Game"	Fallon	2:32
5.	"The Butterfly"	Nesbitt	3:02
6.	"The Voice"	Kelly, Nesbitt	3:07
7.	"Danny Boy"	Méav Ní Mhaolchatha	3:26
8.	"The Soft Goodbye"	Agnew, Kelly, Ní Mhaolchatha	4:00
9.	"Shenandoah / The Contradiction"	Nesbitt	4:04
10.	"Isle of Innisfree"	Fallon	3:29
11.	"Dúlamán"	Ní Mhaolchatha	3:06
12.	"Green the Whole Year 'Round"	Kelly	4:49
13.	"Ave Maria"	Agnew	2:55
14.	"The Sky and the Dawn and the Sun"	Agnew, Fallon, Kelly, Nesbitt, Ní Mhaolchatha, Hayley Westenra	5:21
15.	"Somewhere"	Agnew, Fallon, Kelly, Ní Mhaolchatha	2:14
16.	"Beyond the Sea"	Agnew, Fallon, Kelly, Nesbitt, Ní Mhaolchatha, Westenra	3:21
17.	"Mo Ghile Mear" (Bonus track; live from Slane Castle)	Agnew, Fallon, Kelly, Nesbitt, Ní Mhaolchatha, Westenra	5:06
18.	"Spanish Lady" (Bonus track; live from Slane Castle)	Agnew, Fallon, Kelly, Ní Mhaolchatha, Westenra	2:18

Bonus track on Japanese HQCD
No.	Title	Performer(s)	Length
19.	"Walking in the Air"	Agnew	3:31

== Celtic Woman: The Greatest Journey - The Essential Collection DVD ==
Celtic Woman: The Greatest Journey - The Essential Collection was released on DVD on 30 January 2008 and features vocalists Chloë Agnew, Órla Fallon, Lisa Kelly, Méav Ní Mhaolchatha, Hayley Westenra and fiddler Máiréad Nesbitt. The DVD follows the same format as the CD by reprising songs from previous concerts at the Helix Theatre in Dublin, Ireland in 2004 and Slane Castle in County Meath, Ireland in 2006. Some of the tracks are presented as montages of footage from both concerts, such as "Orinoco Flow", while others are partially abbreviated, such as "Mo Ghile Mear".

=== DVD track listing ===
No.	Title	Performer(s)	Length
1.	"Mo Ghile Mear"	Chloë Agnew, Órla Fallon, Lisa Kelly, Máiréad Nesbitt, Méav Ní Mhaolchatha, Hayley Westenra	4:26
2.	"The Prayer"	Agnew	4:20
3.	"Harry's Game"	Fallon	2:32
4.	"The Butterfly"	Nesbitt	3:02
5.	"Green the Whole Year 'Round"	Kelly	4:49
6.	"Orinoco Flow"	Fallon, Kelly, Ní Mhaolchatha	3:33
7.	"Walking in the Air"	Agnew	4:22
8.	"Danny Boy"	Ní Mhaolchatha	3:26
9.	"The Voice"	Kelly, Nesbitt	3:07
10.	"Scarborough Fair"	Westenra	3:13
11.	"Granuaile's Dance"	Nesbitt	3:40
12.	"Isle of Innisfree"	Fallon	3:29
13.	"Sing Out!"	Agnew, Fallon, Kelly, Nesbitt, Ní Mhaolchatha	4:04
14.	"Over the Rainbow"	Agnew, Fallon, Ní Mhaolchatha, Westenra	2:37
15.	"The Sky and the Dawn and the Sun"	Agnew, Fallon, Kelly, Nesbitt, Ní Mhaolchatha, Westenra	5:21
16.	"May it Be"	Kelly	3:47
17.	"One World"	Agnew, Fallon, Kelly, Ní Mhaolchatha	3:50
18.	"Dúlamán"	Ní Mhaolchatha	3:06
19.	"Newgrange"	Fallon	3:07
20.	"At the Céilí"	Fallon, Kelly, Nesbitt, Ní Mhaolchatha	4:59
21.	"Shenandoah / The Contradiction"	Nesbitt	4:04
22.	"Caledonia"	Kelly	4:49
23.	"Somewhere"	Agnew, Fallon, Kelly, Ní Mhaolchatha	2:14
24.	"The Soft Goodbye"	Agnew, Kelly, Ní Mhaolchatha	3:59
25.	"Nella Fantasia"	Agnew	3:42
26.	"Spanish Lady"	Agnew, Fallon, Kelly, Ní Mhaolchatha, Westenra	2:18
27.	"You Raise Me Up"	Agnew, Fallon, Kelly, Nesbitt, Ní Mhaolchatha, Westenra	4:42

== Personnel ==
Per the liner notes:
Featured performers

- Chloë Agnew – vocals
- Órla Fallon – vocals, harp
- Lisa Kelly – vocals
- Lynn Hilary – vocals
- Méav Ní Mhaolchatha – vocals
- Máiréad Nesbitt – fiddle
- Alex Sharpe – vocals
- Hayley Westenra – vocals (uncredited)

Band

- Des Moore – guitar, bouzouki
- Eoghan O'Neill – bass guitar
- John O'Brien – pipes, whistle
- Ray Fean – drums, percussion
- Robbie Casserly – additional percussion
- Nicky Bailey – percussion
- Robbie Harris, Andrew Reilly – bodhrán
- Russ Powell - cello
- Andreja Malir – harp
- Andrew Boland – pièna-flörten
- David Downes – keyboards, whistles, percussion, backing vocals

The Irish Film Orchestra

- Caitríona Walsh – orchestra contractor
- John Page, David Downes – conductors
- Alan Smale – concertmaster
- Martin Johnston, Bill Butt – solo cello

Aontas Choral Ensemble

- Rosemary Collier – choral director

Discovery Gospel Choir

- Róisin Dexter – conductor

Production

- David Downes – production, arrangements, orchestrations, additional engineering
- Andrew Boland – engineering, mixing
- Recorded at Corrig Sound, Windmill Lane Studios 1 & 2 and RTÉ Studio 1, Dublin, Ireland
- Mixed at Windmill Lane Studios, Dublin, Ireland
- Mastered at Joe Gastwirt at Gastwirt Mastering, Los Angeles, United States

== Chart history ==
Chart (2008)	Peak position
Swiss Albums (Schweizer Hitparade)	83
US Billboard 200	75
US World Albums (Billboard)	1

== Certifications ==
Region	Certification	Certified units/sales
Australia (ARIA)	Gold	7,500^{^}
^{^} Shipments figures based on certification alone.
