= Méav (album) =

Studio album by Méav Ní Mhaolchatha
- Released: 1998
- Genre: Celtic fusion, new age
- Label: K-tel
- Producer: David Agnew; David Downes; Mark Armstrong; Méav

Méav Ní Mhaolchatha chronology
Méav (1998)	Silver Sea (2002)

Méav is the debut album of Irish musician Méav Ní Mhaolchatha. It was released in Ireland in 1998 under the label K-tel. It was released in the USA on February 8, 2000, under the label Hearts of Space and again in 2006 by Manhattan Records. The album was recorded at The Works in Dublin, Ireland.

The album was re-released in 2006 under the title Celtic Woman Presents: Méav by Manhattan Records.

== Track listing ==
Original Release:

No.	Title	Length
1.	"Ailein Duinn (Theme from Rob Roy)"	4:15
2.	"Celtic Prayer"	4:16
3.	"Since You and I Were True"	3:35
4.	"She Moved Through the Fair"	4:06
5.	"I Dreamt I Dwelt In Marble Halls"	3:50
6.	"Im A Doun"	3:05
7.	"Dante's Prayer"	5:34
8.	"I Wish My Love Was a Red, Red Rose"	3:31
9.	"Sí do Mhaimeó í"	2:17
10.	"One I Love"	2:53
11.	"Solveig's Song"	3:57
12.	"Close Your Eyes"	3:16

US Release:

No.	Title	Length
1.	"Ailein Duinn (Theme from Rob Roy)"	4:15
2.	"I Dreamt I Dwelt In Marble Halls"	3:50
3.	"She Moved Through the Fair"	4:06
4.	"Solveig's Song"	3:57
5.	"Im A Doun"	3:05
6.	"I Wish My Love Was a Red, Red Rose"	3:31
7.	"Sí do Mhaimeó í"	2:17
8.	"Since You and I Were True"	3:35
9.	"The Death of Queen Jane"	5:44
10.	"Close Your Eyes"	3:16
11.	"One I Love"	2:53
12.	"Celtic Prayer"	4:16

In the US release of the album, The Death of Queen Jane replaced Dante's Prayer and the tracks were ordered differently.

== Personnel ==
Musicians

- David Adams - Harpsichord
- David Agnew - Oboe, cor anglais, recorder
- Aontas Choral Group - Choir
- Mark Armstrong - Keyboards
- David Downes - Keyboards
- Brian Fleming - Bodhrán, drums
- Frank Gallagher - Fiddle, viola, whistle
- Ivan Gilliland - Guitar
- Russell Powell - Guitar
- Eunan McDonald - Backing vocals, mouth percussion
- Méav - Vocals, harp, keyboards
- Geraint Roberts - Bass
- Andrew Robinson - Viol
- Richard Sweeney - Lute

Technical

- Mark Armstrong - Programming
- Paul Ashe-Brown - Engineer
- Bobby Boughton - Mastering
- Tony Harris - Engineer
- Stephen Hill - Mastering
- Bob Olhsson - Mastering
