= A New Journey =

2007 studio album by Celtic Woman

Celtic Woman: A New Journey

Studio album by Celtic Woman
- Released: 30 January 2007
- Recorded: 2006
- Studios: Windmill Lane Recording Studios and RTÉ Studio 1, Dublin, Ireland
- Genres: Celtic, new-age, classical
- Languages: English, Irish, Italian
- Label: Manhattan
- Producer: David Downes

Celtic Woman chronology
A Christmas Celebration (2006)	Celtic Woman: A New Journey (2007)	The Greatest Journey (2008)

Celtic Woman: A New Journey is the third studio album by Celtic Woman, released worldwide on 30 January 2007.

== Background ==
A New Journey was recorded with the Celtic Woman backing band led by musical director David Downes, the Irish Film Orchestra conducted by John Page, and the Aontas Choral Ensemble directed by Rosemary Collier.

The six principal performers on the album are vocalists Chloë Agnew, Órla Fallon, Lisa Kelly, Méav Ní Mhaolchatha, Hayley Westenra, and fiddler Máiréad Nesbitt. It is also the first - and only - album to introduce Westenra as a new addition to the group.

In preparation for the release of the album, a special concert event was held against the backdrop of Slane Castle in County Meath, Ireland on 23 and 24 August 2006. Footage from both shows were professionally recorded, and the concert, also entitled A New Journey, premiered on American television station PBS and The Walt Disney Company in December 2006, later being released on VHS and DVD formats on 30 January 2007 in conjunction with the album.

== Track listing ==
CD
No.	Title	Performer(s)	Length
1.	"The Sky and the Dawn and the Sun"	Chloë Agnew, Órla Fallon, Lisa Kelly, Máiréad Nesbitt, Méav Ní Mhaolchatha, Hayley Westenra	5:19
2.	"The Prayer"	Agnew	4:20
3.	"Newgrange"	Fallon	3:07
4.	"Over the Rainbow"	Agnew, Fallon, Ní Mhaolchatha, Westenra	2:37
5.	"Granuaile's Dance"	Nesbitt	3:40
6.	"The Blessing"	Kelly	3:49
7.	"Dúlaman"	Ní Mhaolchatha	3:05
8.	"Beyond the Sea"	Agnew, Fallon, Kelly, Nesbitt, Ní Mhaolchatha, Westenra	3:20
9.	"The Last Rose of Summer"	Ní Mhaolchatha, Westenra	3:36
10.	"Caledonia"	Kelly	4:49
11.	"Lascia Ch'io Pianga"	Nesbitt, Westenra	3:31
12.	"Carrickfergus"	Fallon	3:43
13.	"Vivaldi's Rain"	Agnew	2:11
14.	"The Voice"	Kelly, Nesbitt	3:05
15.	"Scarborough Fair"	Westenra	3:13
16.	"Mo Ghile Mear"	Agnew, Fallon, Kelly, Nesbitt, Ní Mhaolchatha, Westenra	4:50

Bonus tracks on deluxe edition
No.	Title	Performer(s)	Length
17.	"Sing Out!"	Agnew, Fallon, Kelly, Nesbitt, Ní Mhaolchatha	4:04
18.	"Shenandoah / The Pacific Slope" (Live from Slane Castle)	Nesbitt	4:43
19.	"At the Céilí" (Live from Slane Castle)	Fallon, Kelly, Nesbitt, Ní Mhaolchatha	4:59
20.	"Spanish Lady" (Live from Slane Castle)	Agnew, Fallon, Kelly, Ní Mhaolchatha, Westenra	2:23

Additional bonus track on various digital download versions
No.	Title	Performer(s)	Length
21.	"Green the Whole Year 'Round" (Live Version)	Kelly	4:49

Bonus tracks on Japanese special edition
No.	Title	Performer(s)	Length
17.	"Somewhere" (Live from Slane Castle)	Agnew, Fallon, Kelly, Ní Mhaolchatha	2:20
18.	"Sing Out!"	Agnew, Fallon, Kelly, Nesbitt, Ní Mhaolchatha	4:04
19.	"Spanish Lady" (Live from Slane Castle)	Agnew, Fallon, Kelly, Ní Mhaolchatha, Westenra	2:23
20.	"You Raise Me Up" (Live from Slane Castle)	Agnew, Fallon, Kelly, Nesbitt, Ní Mhaolchatha, Westenra	5:21

Notes

- Tracks 1, 6 and 17 (18 on Japanese special edition) were composed and written by David Downes and Brendan Graham.
- Track 5 was composed and written by David Downes and Máiréad Nesbitt.
- Tracks 19 (not on Japanese special edition) and 21 were composed by David Downes and written by Shay Healy.

VHS and DVD
No.	Title	Performer(s)	Length
1.	"The Sky and the Dawn and the Sun"	Agnew, Fallon, Kelly, Nesbitt, Ní Mhaolchatha, Westenra
2.	"The Prayer" (from Quest for Camelot)	Agnew
3.	"Caledonia"	Kelly
4.	"Newgrange"	Fallon
5.	"Orinoco Flow"	Fallon, Kelly, Ní Mhaolchatha
6.	"Dúlaman"	Ní Mhaolchatha
7.	"The Blessing"	Kelly
8.	"Scarborough Fair"	Westenra
9.	"Granuaile's Dance"	Nesbitt
10.	"Over the Rainbow" (from The Wizard of Oz)	Agnew, Fallon, Ní Mhaolchatha, Westenra
11.	"Beyond the Sea" (from Finding Nemo)	Agnew, Fallon, Kelly, Nesbitt, Ní Mhaolchatha, Westenra
12.	"At the Céilí"	Fallon, Kelly, Nesbitt, Ní Mhaolchatha
13.	"Lascia Ch'io Pianga"	Nesbitt, Westenra
14.	"Carrickfergus"	Fallon
15.	"Sing Out!"	Agnew, Fallon, Kelly, Nesbitt, Ní Mhaolchatha
16.	"Panis Angelicus"	Agnew
17.	"The Last Rose of Summer" (from The Last Rose of Summer)	Ní Mhaolchatha, Westenra
18.	"Spanish Lady"	Agnew, Fallon, Kelly, Ní Mhaolchatha, Westenra
19.	"Shenandoah / The Pacific Slope"	Nesbitt
20.	"The Voice"	Kelly, Nesbitt
21.	"Danny Boy"	Ní Mhaolchatha
22.	"Somewhere" (from West Side Story)	Agnew, Fallon, Kelly, Ní Mhaolchatha
23.	"Mo Ghile Mear"	Agnew, Fallon, Kelly, Nesbitt, Ní Mhaolchatha, Westenra
24.	"You Raise Me Up"	Agnew, Fallon, Kelly, Nesbitt, Ní Mhaolchatha, Westenra
25.	"At the Céilí" (Reprise)	Nesbitt

== Personnel ==
Celtic Woman

- Chloë Agnew - vocals
- Órla Fallon - vocals, harp
- Lisa Kelly - vocals
- Méav Ní Mhaolchatha - vocals
- Hayley Westenra - vocals
- Máiréad Nesbitt - fiddle

Other musicians

- David Downes - keyboards, piano, grand piano, percussion, harpsichord, whistles, backing vocals, arranger
- Andreja Malir - concert harp
- Desmond Moore - bouzouki, guitar
- John O'Brien - uilleann pipes, whistles
- Russell Powell - guitar
- Eoghan O'Neill - bass guitar
- Raymond Fean - drums, percussion, bodhrán, additional vocals ("Dúlaman")
- Nicholas Bailey - percussion, bodhrán
- Robbie Harris - bodhrán

Aontas Choral Ensemble

- Rosemary Collier - choral director

The Irish Film Orchestra

- John Page - conductor
- Alan Smale - concertmaster

== Charts and certifications ==
The album opened at number 4 on the U.S. Billboard 200, selling 71,000 copies in its first week.

=== Weekly charts ===
Chart (2007)	Peak position
Australian Albums (ARIA Charts)	68
Austrian Albums (Ö3 Austria)	69
Danish Albums (Hitlisten)	32
Dutch Albums (Album Top 100)	92
German Albums (Offizielle Top 100)	56
New Zealand Albums (RMNZ)	33
Portuguese Albums (AFP)	28
Spanish Albums (Promusicae)	59
Swiss Albums (Schweizer Hitparade)	35
US Billboard 200	4
US World Albums (Billboard)	1

=== Year-end charts ===
Chart (2007)	Position
US Billboard 200	108

=== Certifications ===
Region	Certification	Certified units/sales
Australia (ARIA)	3× Platinum	45,000^{^}
United States (RIAA)	Gold	500,000^{^}
^{^} Shipments figures based on certification alone.
