= Distant Shores =

Distant Shores or Distant Shore may refer to:

- Distant Shores (UK TV series), a British dramedic television series
- Distant Shores (album), a 1966 album by Chad & Jeremy
- "Distant Shore", a song by Dierks Bentley from the album Dierks Bentley (album)
- "Distant Shore" (song), a song by Dirty Three
- Distant Shore, a 2003 album by Karan Casey
- Distant Shore (album), a 2009 album by Órla Fallon

== See also ==
- A Distant Shore (disambiguation)
