= A Family Christmas =

A Family Christmas may refer to:

== Albums ==
- A Family Christmas (The Piano Guys album), 2013
- A Family Christmas (Bocelli album), 2022
- A Family Christmas (EP), 2021 EP by We the Kingdom
- A Family Christmas, a 1994 album by John Tesh
- A Family Christmas Album, a 2006 album by Teresa Carpio
- A Family Christmas, a 2009 compilation album by Putumayo World Music
- A Family Christmas, a 2019 EP by Jars of Clay

== Television ==
- A Family Christmas, a 1980 episode from the television series, The Beachcombers
- A Family Christmas, an episode from the television series, This Love Affair

== Books ==
- A Family Christmas, a 1997 book by Joan Hohl, Elizabeth Bevarly and Marilyn Pappano
- A Family Christmas, a 2007 book by Caroline Kennedy
- A Family Christmas, a 2014 book by Katie Flynn

== See also ==
- A Muppet Family Christmas, a Christmas musical television special starring Jim Henson's Muppets
- Duck the Halls: A Robertson Family Christmas, a 2013 album by the cast of A&E reality television series Duck Dynasty
- A Celtic Family Christmas, a 2008 collaborative album by Celtic Woman and The High Kings
- A Flintstone Family Christmas, a 1993 animated Christmas television special by The Flintstones franchise
- Snowfall: The Tony Bennett Christmas Album, a 1968 studio album by Tony Bennett
