= Sensation (Anúna album) =

Studio album by Anúna
- Released: April 2006, June 27, 2006 (USA)
- Recorded: Windmill Lane Studios and on location, Dublin, Ireland, Winter 2005
- Genre: Classical
- Length: 43:42
- Label: Danú
- Producer: Brian Masterson and Michael McGlynn

Anúna chronology
Winter Songs (2002)	Sensation (2006)	Celtic Origins (2007)

Professional ratings
Review scores
Source	Rating
Allmusic	4/5 stars
The Irish Times	
Hot Press	9/10 stars

Sensation, an album by Anúna, was released in 2006 on the Danú label. All music featured on the disc is original, written by the Irish composer Michael McGlynn.

== Track listing ==
1. "O Ignis Spiritus" – 5.59
2. "Brezairola" – 3:32
3. "Sensation" – 5.03
4. "Silver River" – 3:09
5. "Shining Water" – 5:25
6. "Lux Aeterna" – 3:40
7. "The Road of Passage" – 2.20
8. "Whispers of Paradise" – 4.26
9. "Maid in the Moor Lay" – 1:29
10. "Tenebrae IV" – 2:40
11. "O Maria" – 6.08

All titles are originals, composed and arranged by Michael McGlynn

== Personnel ==
- Michael McGlynn
- Miriam Blennerhassett
- Sharon Carty
- Lucy Champion
- Ian Curran
- Monica Donlon
- Elaine Donnelly
- Orfhlaith Flynn
- Toby Gilbert
- Alice Gildea
- Louise Harrison
- Lynn Hilary
- Patrick Hughes
- Emily Jeffers
- Nicola Lewis
- Vincent Lynch
- John McGlynn
- Sinead McGoldrick
- Brian Merriman
- Jeremy Morgan
- Simon Morgan
- Rory Musgrave
- Derek O'Gorman
- Tríona Ó Healaí
- Sarah O'Kennedy
- Aengus Ó Maoláin
- Garrath Patterson
- Charlotte Richardson
- Aideen Rickard
- Ian Russell
- Morgan Savage
- Catrina Scullion
- Marguerite Smith
- Ronan Sugrue

== Guest musicians ==
- Gilles Servat – Speaker
- Máire Bhreathnach – Violin
- Noel Eccles – Percussion
- Kenneth Edge – Saxophone
- Andreja Malir – Concert Harp

== Production ==
- Brian Masterson and Michael McGlynn – Producer
- Brian Masterson – Engineer
- Maria Fitzgerald – Assistant Engineer
- John McGlynn – Photography
- Karen Dignam – Design
- John McGlynn – Cover Image
