= The Elevation Group =

Music, sports and event management

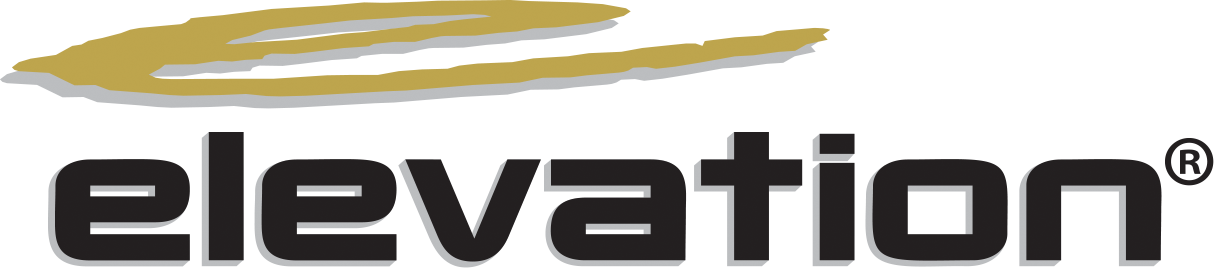
- Formation: 2002
- Founder: Steve Lindecke, Denny Young
- Type: Private Ownership
- Purpose: Sports & Music
- Location(s): Cleveland, Ohio & Charlotte, North Carolina
- Staff: 20+
- Website: elevationgroup.com

The Elevation Group is a music, sports and event management and production company based in the United States. The firm started in November 2002 following the acquisition, by Steve Lindecke and Denny Young, of IMG Motorsports from Mark McCormack’s IMG. Today, the firm focuses on music artist management, concert and festival production and sports marketing. Elevation is based in Cleveland, Ohio United States with additional personnel spread across offices located in Charlotte, Detroit and New York.

== Early history (2003–2006) ==
IMG senior executives, Denny Young and Steve Lindecke, formed Elevation Management LLC in November 2002. The cornerstones of Elevation were the acquisitions of IMG Motorsports and a number of IMG-operated events. Young and Lindecke also had plans for growth in the music business and in early 2003, Elevation created a joint venue with Allen Shapiro and the Mosaic Media Group. The Elevation/MMG partnership produced the Orchestrated Concert Series featuring acts including Duran Duran, Seal, LeAnn Rimes, The Counting Crows and Jewel. Elevation/MMG also created and produced the M&M’s rebranding partnership with Dick Clark Productions and ABC-TV via the New Year’s Rockin’ Eve.

During this time, Elevation managed the racing careers of NASCAR drivers Steve Park and the late Jason Leffler and IndyCar and Indy 500 Champion Gil de Ferran. Additionally, the firm managed various marketing functions for NASCAR Cup Series Champion and Daytona 500 Winner Dale Jarrett.

== Motorsports ==
Elevation is the long-standing motorsports consulting and activation agency for M&M's and various other Mars North America brands including Snickers, Wrigley, Pedigree and Skittles. In 2012, M&M’s was awarded the NASCAR Marketing Achievement Award. Other Elevation NASCAR activation programs have included Budweiser, UPS, General Mills, Citizen Watch, The Home Depot and Albertsons.

Elevation partnered with Bryan Herta Autosport in 2010 and 2011 to field cars in Indianapolis 500. The team won the 2011 race with the late Dan Wheldon behind the wheel of the Honda-powered race car.

In 2013, Elevation added three-time Indy 500 Champion and Dancing with the Stars winner, Helio Castroneves to its motorsports management roster.

In September 2014, Elevation purchased a 40 percent stake in the Stadium Super Trucks; the series had caught Young's attention when it participated at X Games Austin 2014.

== Event production ==
For nearly two decades, Elevation’s Steve Lindecke has worked closely with Olympic Gold Medalist Scott Hamilton to produce all of the Scott Hamilton & Friends skating events. These important fundraising events for cancer research take place in Cleveland, Nashville and Knoxville and have featured Olympic Gold Medalists including Kristi Yamaguchi, Katia Gordeeva, Dorothy Hamill, Meryl Davis/Charlie White, Brian Boitano, Tara Lapinski and many others. Each event is choreographed to live music with the events including musical artists Styx, Michael Bolton, LeAnn Rimes, Aretha Franklin, Cheap Trick and more.

Elevation partnered with Olympic Gold Medalist Karch Kiraly to present the Corona Light Wide Open beach volleyball tour in markets including Chicago, New Orleans, Los Angeles, Cincinnati, Seaside and Santa Cruz and the largest beach volleyball events in the USA including the US Open of Beach Volleyball and the Seaside Beach Volleyball Tournament (World Record Holder for most participants).

== Music of Ireland ==
In 2007, Elevation partnered with Maryland Public Television to produce "Celtic Origins," a national PBS music television program featuring the original Riverdance choir, Anuna. The program which aired throughout the United States, included a companion soundtrack that reached #1 on the Billboard World Music Chart. In 2008, Elevation and MPT teamed up again with Anuna to air "Christmas Memories." The Christmas Memories soundtrack reached #90 on the Billboard Top 200 Pop Albums Chart, an unprecedented feat for a medieval choral group who featured many songs in non-English languages.

In 2009-10, Elevation teamed up with WNET-TV, MPT and Grammy Award winner, Moya Brennan to produce "The Music of Ireland" – a multi-part documentary on contemporary Irish Music. The series, featuring the greatest Irish artists of our time including U2, The Chieftains, The Script, The Clancy Brothers, The Corrs, Damien Rice, Glen Hansard and others won a 2011 Emmy Award for Entertainment Program/Special.

During 2010 and 2011, Elevation and WNET produced and released two PBS music specials featuring former Celtic Woman soprano, Orla Fallon. Each program – "Celtic Christmas" and "My Land" – featured companion album releases that achieved Top-Five status on the Billboard World Music Chart.

== Concert promotion ==
In late 2014, Elevation entered the concert promotion business full-time with the debut of Cathedral Concerts. The series takes place at Cleveland’s gorgeous Trinity Cathedral and has featured artists including Bruce Hornsby, Joe Jackson, Glen Hansard, The Airborne Toxic Event, Belinda Carlisle and many others.

In 2016, Elevation partnered with the Los Angeles-based Industrial Realty Group (IRG) to renovate the Goodyear Theater located on the property of the historic Goodyear World Headquarters in Akron. The 1,500 capacity 1920-circa theater hosts rock, pop, country, R&B, comedy and orchestral concerts.

Also, in 2016, Elevation collaborated with Laurel School to create Cleveland’s first and only contemporary music festival, LaureLive. The annual weekend long music, arts, culinary and educational festival takes place at Laurel’s Butler Campus in Russell and Chester Townships in Geauga County, Ohio. Artists that have performed at LaureLive include Gary Clark Jr., The Head & The Heart, The Revivalists, X Ambassadors, Elle King, Grace Potter, Michael Franti & Spearhead, O.A.R., Judah & The Lion, Young The Giant, Andy Grammer, Needtobreathe, ZZ Ward and many others.

== Music management ==
In 2014, Elevation partnered with G&G Entertainment to sign its first music management client, Red Sun Rising. Red Sun Rising is signed to the Concord Music Group/Razor & Tie and the Agency for Performing Arts for booking. The band is the first rock group in 20 years to have two back-to-back #1 Rock Singles on their debut album. In 2017, RSR was nominated for an iHeart Radio Award – Best New Rock/Alt Group.

300 Entertainment recording artist, Cobi, signed with Elevation in 2015. Cobi is represented by the United Talent Agency for booking. Cobi’s first single, "Don’t You Cry For Me," was the #1 Global Viral Hit on Spotify and was #1 on SiriusXM’s Spectrum station. In 2016, Cobi toured the world as the feature vocalist for Above & Beyond.

Elevation collaborated with G&G once again in 2016 to sign the Canadian rock duo, The Blue Stones. The Blue Stones are signed to Washington Square/Concord Music Group and represented by the Paradigm Talent Agency for booking. With music already featured in Monday Night Football commercials on ESPN, The Blue Stones will release their first album in early 2018.

Elevation manages Australia’s Castlecomer, a band that recently debuted on SiriusXM’s ALT Nation and is a Triple J Unearthed winner and American singer/songwriter, Dom.

== Present ==
Nowadays Elevation has 7 different companies with different purposes, such as music recording and publishing, which operate in the United States, Canada, Australia, the UK, and Ireland.
