= Rebecca Winckworth =

Irish singer

- Born: Newcastle, County Wicklow, Ireland
- Genres: Celtic, acoustic, adult contemporary, classical
- Occupation: Singer
- Instruments: Vocals, harp, piano
- Website: RebeccaWinckworth.com

Rebecca Winckworth is an Irish singer. She was a member of the choral group Anúna, with whom she toured for several years. Winckworth appears on several award-winning Anúna albums, DVDs and collaborations such as Blizzard Entertainment's soundtrack to Diablo III.

== Personal life and education ==
Winckworth was born in Newcastle, County Dublin to parents Sari and Peter Winckworth. She has two sisters. She studied business and French at Trinity College Dublin, followed by a post-grad at business school and a master's in international development at the London School of Economics. She studied singing with Mary Brennan at the Royal Irish Academy of Music. She is based in Medellín, Colombia.

== Career ==
=== Music ===
Winckworth joined a choir at the age of four. When she was 17 she began touring with Anuna. Winckworth travelled as lead vocalist with several award-winning shows, such as the Vocal Academy of Paris and Ragús, on tours across Europe, Asia and America. In 2014, Winckworth performed as a lead singer with Celtic Nights on a three-month tour over 22 states in the USA. In the same year Winckworth was lead singer for the world premiere of Titanic Dance in Odyssey Arena Belfast and The Millennium Forum Derry, and was a special guest for Celtic Woman's PBS special, Destiny. During COVID she organised an online concert series called "Citizens of Song".

=== White & Green ===
Since 2017 Winckworth has worked with her family business White & Green as development, labour rights and fairtrade expert.

== Discography ==
- Wonderchild (2001)
- Christmas Memories [CD and DVD] (Anúna, 2008)
- Sanctus (Anúna, 2009)
- Christmas with Anúna (Anúna, 2010)
- Illumination (Anúna, 2012)
- Orla Fallon's Celtic Christmas (With Anúna, 2010)
- The Wiggles' It's Always Christmas With You [CD and DVD] (With Anúna, 2011)
- Clannad Live at Christ Church Cathedral (With Anúna, 2011)
- The Roots of Ireland [CD and DVD] (2012)
- Diablo 3 Soundtrack (With Anúna, 2012)
- Babylon Sisters EP (2012)
- Rebecca Winckworth Album (2013)
- Ragús the show DVD (2013)
- Celtic Woman: Destiny [CD, DVD, Blu-Ray] (2015)
- Sueña Cantar (Dapinty, 2020)
- Rebecca Winckworth - Together at El Alto (2020)
- Rebecca Winckworth - Chapters of Time (2025)
