= Thumbelina (soundtrack) =

Thumbelina: Original Motion Picture Soundtrack

Soundtrack album by Barry Manilow and various artists
- Released: February 24, 1994
- Recorded: 1991–1993
- Genre: Easy listening, musical theater, soundtrack
- Length: 41:07
- Label: SBK Records (USA); EMI Records (UK)
- Producer: Barry Manilow

Barry Manilow and various artists chronology
| Rock-a-Doodle (1990) | Thumbelina: Original Motion Picture Soundtrack (1994) | A Troll in Central Park (1994) |

Singles from Thumbelina: Original Motion Picture Soundtrack
- 1. "Let Me Be Your Wings (with Debra Byrd)" Released: 18 July 1994

Professional ratings
Review scores
| Source | Rating |
|---|---|
| AllMusic | link |
| Music Week | 3/5 stars |

Thumbelina: Original Motion Picture Soundtrack is the soundtrack to the 1994 Don Bluth animated feature Thumbelina and was released on February 24, 1994. The soundtrack was composed entirely by Barry Manilow. Manilow, along with lyricists Bruce Sussman and Jack Feldman, who wrote the songs. Bluth personally approached Manilow, who had been quoted as saying he originally aspired to be a soundtrack composer, to record the album. For his part, Manilow was enthusiastic about the opportunity to score Thumbelina, as an animated film where almost the entire runtime was soundtracked.

The song "Marry The Mole", sung by Carol Channing, was the recipient of a Razzie award, making Thumbelina the first animated film to "win" a Razzie. The CD was a limited release and has been out of print since. It is also available on cassette.

== Cast ==
- Thumbelina - Jodi Benson
- Miss Fieldmouse - Carol Channing
- Mrs. Toad - Charo
- Jacquimo - Gino Conforti
- Thumbelina's Mother - Barbara Cook
- Berkeley Beetle - Randy Crenshaw
- Prince Cornelius - Gary Imhoff
- The Toads - Domenick Allen, Larry Kenton, Rick Riso
- Chorus - Anúna

== Track listing ==
All lyrics are written by Bruce Sussman and Jack Feldman, while all music is composed by Barry Manilow.

| No. | Title | Performer(s) | Length |
|---|---|---|---|
| 1. | "Opening Credits: Let Me Be Your Wings" | | 1:34 |
| 2. | "Follow Your Heart (Intro)" | Gino Conforti | 1:46 |
| 3. | "Jacquimo Tells The Story" | | 2:00 |
| 4. | "Thumbelina" | Jodi Benson & Anúna | 2:32 |
| 5. | "Soon" | Jodi Benson | 1:55 |
| 6. | "Entrance of the Faeries" | | 1:49 |
| 7. | "Let Me Be Your Wings" | Jodi Benson & Gary Imhoff | 2:58 |
| 8. | "Mama Toad Kidnaps Thumbelina" | | 1:10 |
| 9. | "On the Road" | Charo, Jodi Benson, Joe Lynch, Danny Mann & Loren Lester | 3:21 |
| 10. | "Over The Waterfall" | | 1:46 |
| 11. | "Follow Your Heart" | Gino Conforti & Anúna | 2:14 |
| 12. | "Yer Beautiful, Baby" | Randy Crenshaw & Anúna | 2:49 |
| 13. | "Cornelius Searches for Thumbelina" | | 1:09 |
| 14. | "Soon (Reprise)" | Barbara Cook | 1:55 |
| 15. | "Let Me Be Your Wings (Sun Reprise)" | Jodi Benson | 0:52 |
| 16. | "Marry the Mole" | Carol Channing | 1:51 |
| 17. | "Thumbelina Escapes" | | 2:12 |
| 18. | "Finale: Let Me Be Your Wings / Follow Your Heart" | Jodi Benson, Gary Imhoff, Gino Conforti & Anúna | 3:54 |
| 19. | "Let Me Be Your Wings (End Title)" | Barry Manilow & Debra Byrd | 3:20 |

- Note: The wedding reprise of "Let Me Be Your Wings" is not on the soundtrack.
