= A Distant Shore =

A Distant Shore may refer to:

- A Distant Shore (album),by Tracey Thorn
- A Distant Shore (novel),by Caryl Phillips
- A Distant Shore: African Americans of D-Day, a television documentary program

== See also ==
- Distant Shores (disambiguation)
