= Lynn Hilary =

Irish singer, guitarist, and songwriter (born 1982)

- Born: 21 April 1982 (age 44); Dublin, Ireland
- Genres: Celtic; acoustic; classical
- Occupations: Singer, songwriter
- Instruments: Vocals; guitar; Piano
- Years active: 2000–present
- Labels: Celtic Collections; Manhattan
- Website: www.lynnhilary.ie

Lynn Hilary (born 21 April 1982) is an Irish singer, guitarist, and songwriter. She has also performed as a featured soprano soloist in the all-female ensemble Celtic Woman.

== Early life ==
Hilary was born in Dublin, Ireland, and completed a Bachelor of Music performance degree in 2005 at the DIT College of Music. Initially singing classical music, she moved to Celtic music to be able to "use [her] natural vocal range". Among the singers who influenced her, she counts Michael Jackson, Joni Mitchell, and Karen Carpenter.

== Career ==
=== Anúna ===
Hilary joined the Irish choral group Anúna in 2000. She toured the United States, Morocco, the Netherlands, and Finland with the group, and she has sung with the choir and featured as a soloist on six of their albums: Invocation (2001), Winter Songs (2001), Behind the Closed Eye (2002), Sensation (2006) "Illumination" (2012) and "Revelation" (2015). She continues to sing with Anúna and has appeared with them on the soundtrack of Diablo III as a soloist.

=== Celtic Woman ===
In 2007, longtime Celtic Woman member Méav Ní Mhaolchatha decided to leave the group to focus on her solo career. As a result, Hilary joined the group in time to feature in the A New Journey tour, which started on 10 October 2007 in Estero, FL. She was the first new full-time member to join the group since its inception in 2004.

Hilary has featured to date in Celtic Woman: The Greatest Journey, Celtic Woman: Songs from the Heart, Celtic Woman: Lullaby, and the Japanese release of Celtic Woman: Believe. She has only appeared in one PBS special/DVD, Celtic Woman: Songs from the Heart which was shot at Powerscourt House and Gardens in Summer 2009. She has also appeared in three tours, A New Journey, Isle of Hope, and Songs from the Heart.

Following Celtic Woman's inaugural Australian Tour in November 2010, Hilary announced she would be leaving Celtic Woman to return to her home and life in Ireland. She was replaced by actress Lisa Lambe as part of the Celtic Woman line-up. On 14 February 2014 it was announced that Lynn would be returning to Celtic Woman for their Emerald tour in March while Lisa Lambe goes on a short 'leave of absence.' Lisa Lambe returned for two tours in the fall and winter of 2014, but announced she would be concentrating on solo work in 2015. Lynn again toured with Celtic Woman Tenth for part of their Tenth Anniversary Tour, which started in January 2015 and ended in 2015.

=== Other performances ===
Hilary performed the lead vocal of the piece "Cloudsong" from Riverdance at the Opening Ceremony of the 2003 Special Olympics in Croke Park, Dublin, and toured the US with Riverdance in 2006 as a featured soloist. She released a solo album, Take Me With You, in 2008.

In September 2011, Hilary returned to music as a member of the Irish singing trio the Bluebelles, with two current Anúna members Nicola Lewis and Rebecca Winckworth.

According to a trailer released in 2012, Hilary was to be a featured soloist in a new show entitled "The Roots of Ireland," but she has since returned to Riverdance. She was a member of a musical group called Babylon Sisters which featured Lisa Nolan, and fellow Anúna singer, Rebecca Winckworth. The group disbanded when Winckworth left to tour with Celtic Nights, and Hilary with Riverdance.

In 2013, Hilary recorded her second album, Saturn Return, under the label CD Baby. The album consists of "original songs of a jazzy, folky nature" and is "an interpretation of a life up to the point of its first Saturn Return." The album represents a reflection of upon the first thirty or so years of one's life and the opportunity to transform oneself based on the lessons learned.

On 11 July 2016, it was announced that Hilary was forming a new group called CaraNua. The group also consists of former Celtic Woman singer Alex Sharpe and former Celtic Woman choir member Edel Murphy.

== Discography ==
Solo

- Take Me With You (2008) Recorded and released on Irish record label Celtic Collections
- Saturn Return (2013)
- Sacred Songs (March 2021)

With Celtic Woman

- Celtic Woman: The Greatest Journey (2008)
- Celtic Woman: Songs from the Heart (2010)
- Celtic Woman: Lullaby (2011)
- Celtic Woman: Solo (2015)
- Celtic Woman: Decade (2016)
- Celtic Woman: Celebration: 15 Years of Music and Magic (2020)

With CaraNua

- Favorite Hymns (November 2017)
- Evermore Park Vol. 1: The Soundtrack of Magical Lore (September 2018)
- Evermore Park Vol. 2: The Soundtrack of Cursed Lore (September 2018)
- Celtic Dreaming (2019)
- A Celtic Christmas (2019)

With Anúna

- Invocation (2002)
- Winter Songs (2002)
- Behind the Closed Eye (2003)
- Sensation (2006)
- Invocations of Ireland (2009). DVD; features on the track "The Road of Passage"
- Illumination (2012)
- Revelation (2015)

With Colm Ó Foghlú

- Mass of the Angels (2011)
- The Star Of Bethlehem: A Celtic Christmas Oratorio (2015)

With the cast of Riverdance

- Riverdance: Music from the Show (2005) – 10th Anniversary Edition
