= The Calling (Méav album) =

Studio album by Méav Ní Mhaolchatha
- Released: August 26, 2013
- Recorded: October – November 2012
- Studios: RAK Studios, London; Soundscape Studios, County Dublin; Windmill Lane Studios, Dublin
- Genre: Folk
- Length: 43:22
- Label: Warner Classics
- Producer: Craig Leon

Méav Ní Mhaolchatha chronology
Celtic Dreams (2006)	The Calling (2013)

The Calling is an album by Méav Ní Mhaolchatha. It was released in 2013 under the label Warner Classics, and was produced by Craig Leon.

== Track listing ==
No.	Title	Length
1.	"The First Time Ever I Saw Your Face"	3:31
2.	"The Calling"	3:57
3.	"Light Flight"	3:34
4.	"Listen, Listen"	3:59
5.	"The Songline to Home"	4:02
6.	"Wayfaring Stranger"	4:53
7.	"Sovay"	2:35
8.	"Shenandoah"	3:13
9.	"Once You Were My Lover"	3:35
10.	"Glimmering Girl"	3:00
11.	"Glasgow’s Burning"	3:03
12.	"Black Is the Colour"	4:02
Total length:		43:22

== Personnel ==
Musicians

- Nicky Bailey - Percussion
- Paul Clarvis - Percussion
- Simon Edwards - Bass
- Paula Hughes - Violin
- Craig Leon - Guitar, keyboards
- Eunan McDonald - Backing vocals
- Méav - Arrangement, vocals
- Simon Morgan - Backing vocals
- John O'Brien - Flute, uilleann pipes, whistle
- Katie O'Connor - Violin
- Anne Marie O'Farrell - Harp
- John Parricelli - Guitar, mandolin
- Gerald Peregrine - Cello, violin
- Kenneth Rice - Violin
- Cliodhna Ryan - Violin
- Una O'Kane - Violin

Technical

- Simon Gibson - Mastering
- Craig Leon - Mixing, producer
- Brian Masterson - Engineer
- Richard Woodcroft - Engineer
