= Lisa Kelly (singer) =

- Born: 7 May 1977 (age 49); Dublin, Ireland
- Genres: Celtic; classical
- Occupations: Singer, voice teacher
- Instruments: Vocals; piano
- Years active: 1998–present
- Labels: Celtic Collections; Manhattan

Lisa Kelly (born 7 May 1977) is an Irish singer of both classical and Celtic music and a voice teacher. She has taken part in many musical theatre productions and concerts, and is a founding and former member of the musical group Celtic Woman.

== Early life ==
Lisa Kelly was born in Dublin into a musical family. Her parents, Joe and Noeleen Kelly, and sisters, Joanne and Helen Kelly, were all singers. Lisa started singing at seven, when she starred in the musical version of Bugsy Malone. Her parents were both heavily involved in amateur theatre, influencing Lisa toward studying drama, as well as being classically trained in both piano and singing.

== Career ==
She has played several leading roles, such as "Velma Kelly" in Chicago, "Florence" in Chess, "Laurey" in Oklahoma!, "Maria" in West Side Story and "Sandy" in Grease.

She has also performed in a number of concerts in Dublin's National Concert Hall, including The Magic of Gershwin, The Music of Cole Porter and From Romberg to Rodgers, and has won numerous national awards for singing and drama.

=== Riverdance ===
After deciding to take a break from her day job in the computer industry and return to theatre, she played the lead role in the Christmas pantomime Jack and the Beanstalk at Dublin's Gaiety Theatre. This led to her being cast in the American production of Riverdance – The Show as lead female vocalist in 2000, a position she held for five years while touring. While touring with Riverdance, Kelly met Australian dancer Scott Porter, who she later married. During this time, Kelly also met fellow vocalist Lynn Hilary, who would later go on to become a member of Celtic Woman in 2007 as a replacement for Méav Ní Mhaolchatha.

Kelly was one of the Riverdance vocalists who appeared in the 2003 Special Olympics opening ceremony when they performed "Cloudsong". This was in support of Lynn Hilary, who had the leading vocal role at the start of the song.

=== Solo album ===
In 2002, Kelly was asked to record a solo album with director David Downes on the Celtic Collections label. The resulting album, Lisa, was released in 2003. Songs on this CD are Carrickfergus, Siúil a Rún, The Deer's Cry, Lift the Wings, The Soft Goodbye, Home and the Heartland, Homecoming, Now We Are Free, Dubhdarra, May It Be and Send Me a Song.

=== Celtic Woman ===
Kelly was again approached by Downes in 2004 and asked to be part of Celtic Woman, originally planned as a one-night event at Dublin's Helix Theatre. The group has since released several albums and DVD performances of their concerts and embarked on several world tours.

She says she accepted the spot in Celtic Woman because "I wasn't doing anything else that day." She did not know any of the artists she would be performing with when they first got together, but Kelly stated that "the show is blessed with the girls [the show's creators] picked." She has toured with Celtic Woman throughout most of their tours and appears in almost every CD and DVD to date.

Kelly performs several songs with Celtic Woman. She sings "Send Me a Song" and "The Blessing," both originals that have been featured on the original and A New Journey CDs, DVDs, and tours respectively. They were written by David Downes and feature him on the piano. Kelly performed "The Voice" in A New Journey, which was originally supposed to be sung by Méav Ní Mhaolchatha, and also features fiddler Máiréad Nesbitt. "The Voice" was written by Irish novelist and composer Brendan Graham. Another song that Kelly performed in the original performance is "May It Be", originally from the movie The Lord of the Rings: The Fellowship of the Ring. Kelly sang "Caledonia" in A New Journey, and sang "Fields of Gold" during the Isle of Hope and Songs From the Heart tours. In Songs From the Heart, she also sang "The Moon's a Harsh Mistress," accompanied by Máiréad Nesbitt on the violin.

During the spring 2008 A New Journey tour, and again during the "Believe" 2012 tour, Kelly took a break due to the birth of her children. She was replaced by Alex Sharpe, who later became a full-time member of Celtic Woman when Orla Fallon left. During the "Believe" tour, her place was filled in by Susan McFadden.

Her second break from Celtic Woman was eventually announced as permanent in January 2013, and McFadden became a permanent member of the group. On leaving Celtic Woman, Kelly told Charlie Patton of the Florida Times-Union, "It was an amazing experience, but with four kids, I just needed stability."

=== Other ===
In 2009, Kelly sang the main title song "If You Believe" for the Disney movie Tinker Bell and the Lost Treasure. Kelly was one of four people involved who were connected to Celtic Woman – the others being violinist Máiréad Nesbitt, musical director and composer David Downes, and former member and vocalist Méav Ní Mhaolchatha.

== Teaching ==
In January 2013, Kelly announced that her second departure from Celtic Woman was permanent. Her family moved to Peachtree City, Georgia, US, where she announced the opening of The Lisa Kelly Voice Academy, indicating a switch from performing to teaching. The new voice academy is being run in conjunction with her husband Scott Porter, the former CEO of Celtic Woman Ltd. She also starred in a concert titled The Voice of Ireland, featuring fellow Celtic Woman performer Chloë Agnew and former Celtic Thunder member Paul Byrom. The second The Lisa Kelly Voice Academy was opened in Ponte Vedra Beach, Florida, in February 2016.

On 13 December 2014, she starred in the concert titled A Celtic Christmas, featuring fellow Celtic Woman performer Chloë Agnew, former Celtic Woman choir performer Dermot Kiernan, and former Celtic Thunder member Paul Byrom, along with performances by the Kelly Porter Dance Academy.

== Personal life ==
She is married to Australian dancer Scott Porter. They have four children: sons Cian (born 2002), Jack (born 2004) and Harry (born 2012), and daughter Ellie (born 2008).

Lisa's sister Helen has performed with Celtic Woman in the choir.

== Discography ==
Solo

- Lisa (2003; re-released 2006)
- Christmas Everywhere (2014 – single)
- Sending Home To You (2015 – single)

With Celtic Woman

- Celtic Woman (March 2005)
- Celtic Woman: A Christmas Celebration (October 2006)
- Celtic Woman: A New Journey (January 2007)
- Celtic Woman: The Greatest Journey (October 2008)
- Celtic Woman: Songs from the Heart (January 2010)
- Celtic Woman: Lullaby (February 2011)
- Celtic Woman: Believe (May 2011; January 2012)
- Celtic Woman: Silent Night (2012)
- Celtic Woman: Solo (May 2015)
- Celtic Woman: Christmas (2015)
- Celtic Woman: Decade (January 2016)
- Celtic Woman: The Best of Christmas (November 2017)
- Celtic Woman: Celebration-15 Years of Music and Magic (February 2020)
- Celtic Woman: 20 (January 2024)
