= Distant Shore (album) =

Studio album by Órla Fallon
- Released: September 2009
- Studio: Windmill Lane Studios (Dublin, Ireland); Dark Horse Studios ( Nashville, Tennessee)
- Label: Spring Hill, Green Hill Music
- Producer: Dan Shea; Eoghan O'Neill

Órla Fallon chronology
The Water is Wide (2000)	Distant Shore (2009)	Music of Ireland: Welcome Home (2010)

Distant Shore is the second solo album by Irish singer Órla Fallon. It was released in September 2009 under label Spring Hill Music Group. It was also released in 2010 under the label Green Hill Music on 20 April 2010.

The album was produced by Dan Shea and Eoghan O'Neill. It was recorded at Windmill Lane Studios in Dublin, Ireland and at Dark Horse Studios in Nashville, Tennessee.

The album "mixes traditional, contemporary, and original compositions."

== Track listing ==
No.	Title	Composer(s) / Arranger(s)	Length
1	Who Knows?	Peter Eades, Orla Fallon	4:37
2	Distant Shore	Dan Shea, John Bettis	4:29
3	Dancing In The Moonlight	Orla Fallon	3:56
4	My Land	Secret Garden (Rolf Lovland, Alana Graham, Brendan Graham)	3:56
5	Shooting Star	Peter Eades, Orla Fallon	3:15
6	Bean An Ti	Eoghan O'Neill, Des Moore	2:51
7	Always There	Secret Garden (Rolf Lovland, Brendan Graham)	4:08
8	Voices On The Wind	Little Feat	4:47
9	Simple Love	Sarah Siskind	4:30
10	My Waking World	Ray Fean	3:55
11	Eleanor Plunkett: Trip To Shanbally, Michael O'Dwyer's	Turlough O'Carolan, Eoghan O'Neill, Des Moore	4:43
12	You'll Never Be The Sun	Donagh Long	4:05
13	Hard Times	Stephen Foster	3:44

Note: Track 5 is a song that was originally written earlier for the 2005/2006 Celtic Woman world tours.

== Personnel ==
- Shannon Forrest - drums
- Ilya Toshinsky - acoustic guitar, electric guitar
- Dan Shea - acoustic guitar, mandolin, piano, keyboards
- Des Moore - acoustic guitar
- Noel Eccles - percussion
- Jim Brickman - piano
- Dónal Lunny - bouzouki
- Liam Bradley
- Orla Fallon - vocals, harp, background vocals
- Feargal Murray
- Máíire Breatnach - fiddle, viola
- Robbie Harris - bodhran
- Russell Powell - cello
- Alan Smale - strings
- Beth "Diva" Davis
- David James Jr.
- Missi Hale - background vocals
- Todd Denman - whistling, pipe
