= Bagad Lann Bihoue =

Breton pipe band

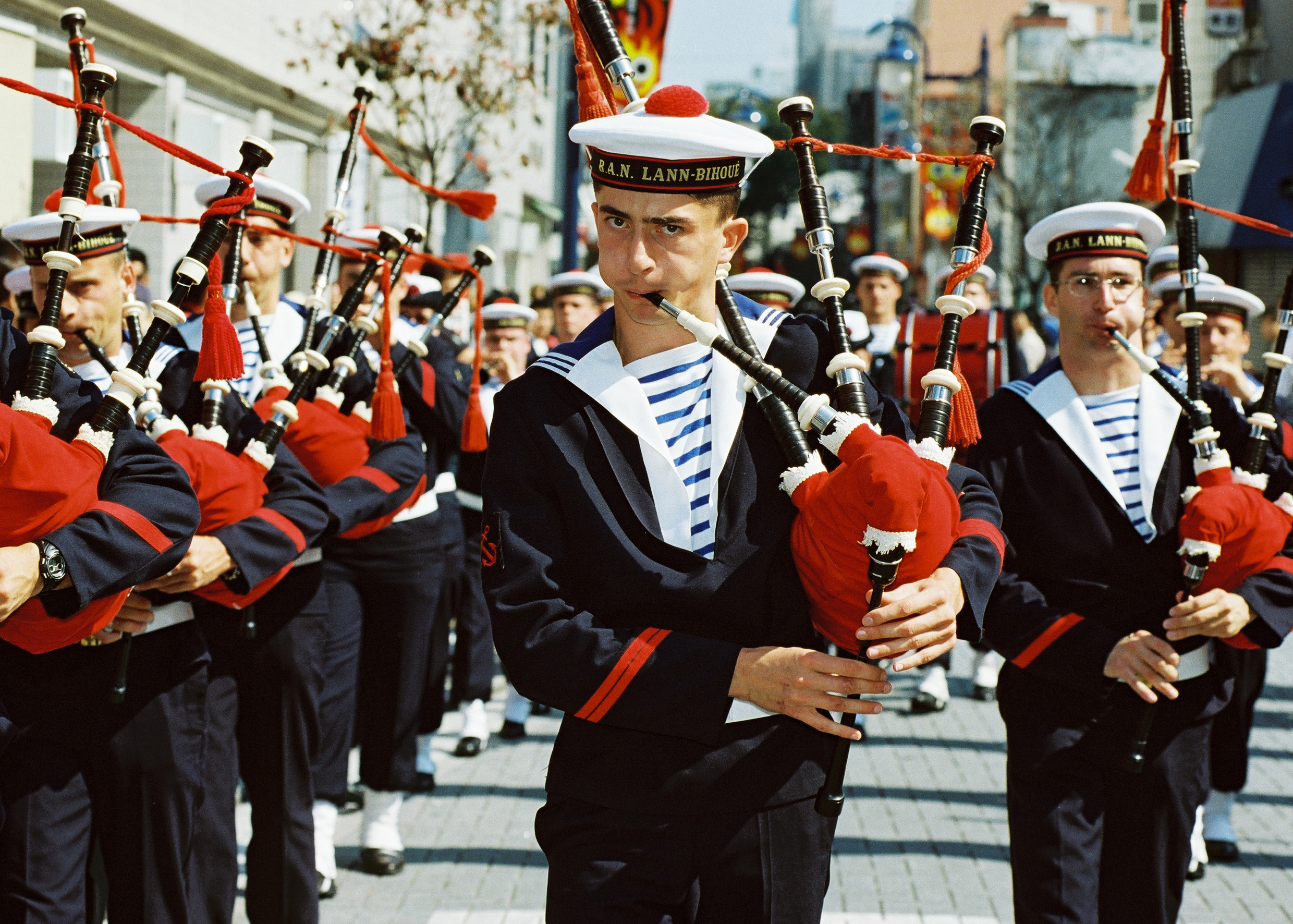
The Bagad in parade

The Bagad de Lann-Bihoué is a bagad, a Breton pipe band. It is the bagad of the French Navy. It represents the French Navy and France in multiple national and international events. It has performed regularly in front of Heads of State. It is a source of cultural influence in Brittany, as in the rest of France.

It was created in 1952 on the naval air base Lann-Bihoué near Lorient (Morbihan). Having almost been disbanded twice in 1969 and in 2000, it secured its existence in 2001 by becoming a professional band. It has recorded about fifteen albums during its over 60 years of existence and has participated in several songs or albums from other artists.

30 sonneurs sign a one-year contract renewable three times. They write and arrange the bagad directory themselves, reflecting their personality and their knowledge of their terroir or of a particular music style.

== Discography ==
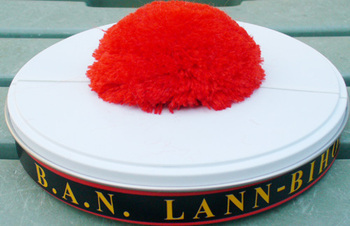
CD "55 ans" in 2007

- 1982: 30e Anniversaire 1952-1982 (Keltia Musique)
- 1989: Bagad de Lann-Bihoué (Keltia Musique)
- 1991: Marches, danses et mélodies (Coop Breizh)
- 1992: 40e Anniversaire 1952-1992 (Coop Breizh)
- 1996: Glann Glaz (Coop Breizh)
- 1997: Entre Terre et Mer France 2 Music (Polygram)
- 1998: Me gav hir an amzer (Keltia Musique)
- 2000: Ar Mor Diven (Columbia Tristar / Sony Music)
- 2002: Fromveur (Sony Music)
- 2005: Kerbagad (Coop Breizh / Label Production)
- 2007: Bagad de Lann-Bihoué (Keltia Musique)
- 2007: Bagad de Lann-Bihoué : 55 ans (Coop Breizh / Label Production)
- 2012: Degemer Mat (EMI)

== See also ==
- Music of Brittany
