= Philip Hammond (composer) =

Irish composer (born 1951)

Philip Hammond (born 5 May 1951), is an Irish composer. He has also been a teacher, writer and broadcaster.

He has written for The Brodsky String Quartet, the Ulster Orchestra and Lontano. He has also written for the flautist James Galway, pianists Barry Douglas, Michael McHale, and Anthony Capparelli, the British violinist Tasmin Little, the Russian pianist Nicolai Demidenko, and singers Ann Murray, Suzanne Murphy, Robin, Tritschler, and Sarah Walker.

== Early life and education ==
Hammond was born in Belfast. After studying at Cabin Hill Preparatory School and Campbell College, Belfast, Hammond graduated from Queen's University Belfast in 1974 as a Bachelor of Music and Master of Arts. In 2003 he was awarded a Doctorate of Music from Queen’s.

== Career as a composer ==
While teaching at Cabin Hill, Hammond regularly performed as a pianist and accompanist with the mezzo-soprano Daphne Arlow and in a piano duo with Michael McGuffin, performing and presenting for BBC Radio Ulster, BBC Radio Three and RTE.

His first major commission, Thanatos (1977), was written for the choir of the Royal Victoria Hospital. It became controversial when what was to have been its first live performance was disrupted when some of the original singers objected to the piece on "moral grounds". Following publicity on the BBC, Radio Three offered to record the first performance. That studio performance, with the Choir of St Anne's Cathedral, was broadcast throughout the UK and subsequently performed live at the Ulster Museum by a different grouping of performers. The work is dedicated to the composer and academic Adrian Thomas.

Hammond received a commission from Radio Three, and Narcissus, a setting of poems by George Barker, was performed by Lontano and mezzo-soprano Linda Hirst in April 1981 as part of the Sonorities Festival of Twentieth Century Music. It was later broadcast by BBC Radio Three and received a London premiere by the same performers in 1982.

One of Hammond's most frequently performed pieces, French Blue, was commissioned by the GPA Dublin International Piano Competition. It was a test piece for the competition. He later wrote two companion pieces Irish Green for Iain Burnside and African Black for Ruth McGinley who had reached the finals of the BBC Young Musician of the Year Competition in 1993 and who had played French Blue as part of that competition.

His Waterfront Fanfares (1997) were written for the opening of the Waterfront Hall, Belfast; and his work for piano and orchestra ... the starry dynamo in the machinery of night ... was commissioned by Queen's University Belfast for a concert in Belfast's Waterfront Hall marking the award of an honorary degree to President Bill Clinton in 2001. It was subsequently performed on a tour of the United States by Barry Douglas and Camerata Ireland.

Many of Hammond's pieces have a strong literary association. His orchestral piece Die Ersten Blumen (1996) was a response to a poem by Hermann Hesse. The White Lake (1999) was a choral and orchestral setting of a specially commissioned poem by Michael Longley, and one of his most recent large-scale compositions, Psalms and Songs from the Hebrew (2000) for chorus and orchestra, was a setting of mediaeval Jewish poetry from Spain.

His work ... while the sun shines was commissioned by BBC Radio Three for performance in September 2005 and celebrates the music of the great Irish conductor and composer Sir Hamilton Harty (in 1979, Philip Hammond contributed two chapters to a book on Sir Hamilton Harty published by Blackstaff Press).

== Arts Council ==
Hammond was a Director at the Arts Council of Northern Ireland. While at the Arts Council, Hammond spent two years seconded to the Northern Ireland government to design and manage an international arts festival in Washington DC to accompany Northern Ireland's role as a featured region in the 2007 Smithsonian Folklife Festival.

== Post Arts Council career ==
After he retired from the Arts Council, Hammond continued to compose, write, and was a regular presenter and correspondent on the BBC and the Irish state broadcaster RTÉ as an arts correspondent and music critic. For several years he wrote for The Belfast Telegraph and the Culture Northern Ireland website.

Hammond composed a series of piano pieces focused on Lorca and written for the Irish pianist Cathal Breslin for his debut recital at the Carnegie Hall, New York, in June 2009.

In April 2012, the first performance of his Requiem for the Lost Souls of the Titanic was performed in Belfast Cathedral on the hundredth anniversary of the sinking. This large-scale work was broadcast by the BBC and RTÉ.

The writing of the Requiem for the Lost Souls of the Titanic had overshadowed another of Hammond’s major compositional outputs from that time - his series of twenty one piano pieces entitled “Miniatures and Modulations” released as a CD by the Grand Piano label of Naxos.

Based on the transcriptions of The Ancient Music of Ireland by Edward Bunting, following the Belfast Harp Festival of 1792, these traditional tunes have offered Hammond a significant and lasting source of musical inspiration in his compositional style. He has since added to the original collection of Miniatures and Modulations as piano solos, and several of the bardic tunes also appear as a basis in his “Lament for an Irish Rebel” commissioned in 2016 by the Belfast Music Society for the Irish tenor, Robin Tritschler. It was recorded and subsequently broadcast on BBC Radio Three.

That same year he set four poems by Belfast poet Sinead Morrissey, entitled Angel Voices, and his settings of poetry by the infamous Irish poet Thomas Moore were premiered at Dublin’s National Concert Hall in 2016 as part of the official celebrations marking the anniversary of the Irish Rebellion.

== Piano Concerto ==
Hammond’s Piano Concerto was commissioned by BBC Radio Three in 2014 for Michael McHale.

It was written during a residency the composer was invited to complete at the Centre Culturel Irlandais in Paris, and in 2016 the concerto was released by the RTE National Symphony Orchestra, under the Belfast born conductor Courtney Lewis with McHale as soloist. In 2018, the Ludlow English Song Weekend commissioned Hammond to write “The Blackbird’s Poet”, a setting of poetry by the Irish poet Francis Ledwidge, for tenor, flute and piano. It was premiered in Ludlow in April 2018 by Iain Burnside, Robin Tritschler and Adam Walker, principal flute of the London Symphony Orchestra for some years. The same performers repeated this piece at the Wigmore Hall in 2022.

== Return to Belfast ==
Hammond spent much of his time after 2018 living in Oregon, USA, but following the Covid years, and his return to Belfast, he composed very little until 2025 when he began a setting of poems by John Hewitt, entitled “..at the tide’s turn…” which will mark the fortieth anniversary of Hewitt’s death in 2027. Hewitt was particularly associated with the county of Antrim and Hammond included a response to Hewitt’s poem “Ireland” in a CD released by American pianist Anthony Capparelli of Hammond’s music and entitled “Tales of the Glens” and featuring an innovative new work for piano and two storytellers. It was released in 2024 under the Divine Art Recordings label.
