= Alex Sharpe =

Irish soprano singer and actress (born 1972)

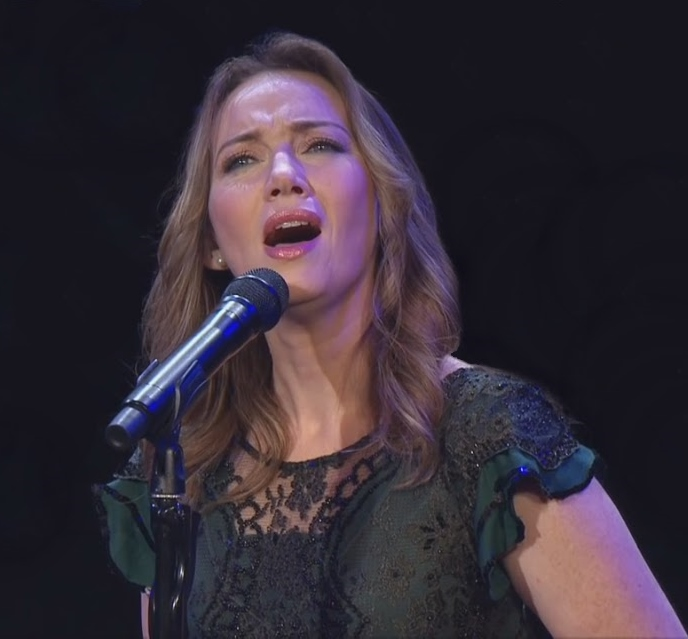
- Sharpe with the Tabernacle Choir, Salt Lake City, Utah, August 2015

Background information
- Born: Alexandria Sharpe; 4 May 1971 (age 55); Portmarnock, County Dublin, Ireland
- Occupations: Singer, actress
- Years active: 1991–present
- Musical career
- Genres: Musical theatre; Celtic; Christian; classical; new-age; easy listening
- Labels: Telstar TV; Manhattan; A#
- Website: www.alexsharpeofficial.com

Alexandria Sharpe (born 4 May 1971) is an Irish soprano singer and actress mostly known for her live roles in London's West End and on the Irish stage (both the Olympia and Gaiety Theatres). In the United States she is best known as one of the former members of Celtic Woman from 2008 to 2010.

== Career ==
She began her career at 1991 by portraying Dorothy in The Wizard of Oz at the Olympia Theatre in Dublin.

Her career in musical theatre continued, as she played Janet in The Rocky Horror Show, Young Sally in Follies in Concert, Jenny in Aspects of Love, and Mila in Aloha Kamano by Sean Purcell. She was asked to play Éponine in Les Misérables for the Cameron Mackintosh Company in the UK and Ireland and in the Concert Tour of Les Misérables. She created the role of Bernadette in the Andrew Lloyd Webber/Ben Elton Musical The Beautiful Game. On her return to Ireland she played the role of Kate Foley in The Wireman in the Gaiety Theatre, Dublin.

Alex has sung with the Icelandic Royal Philharmonic Orchestra, The Danish National Symphony, and the RTÉ Concert Orchestra. She has appeared on several recordings, such as on the Evita film Soundtrack with Madonna.

She has appeared at The Prince's Trust concert in the Mayflower Theatre, England.

In 2006 she travelled to Chicago to launch the musical The Pirate Queen as principal female.

She was a featured soloist at Andrew Lloyd Webber's 60th birthday celebration (2008) with the RTE Orchestra.

In 2014 she released her first solo album "Be Still My Soul" produced by Andrew Holdsworth, which is a collection of hymnal and Easy listening classical songs.

=== Celtic Woman ===
When founding member of Celtic Woman Lisa Kelly went on maternity leave, Sharpe became a temporary member of the ensemble in 2008, saying that "I'm just in for this tour," and "It's a different style than I'm used to. But I've enjoyed learning the technique. My background is musical theatre, so this is something very different for me...But my philosophy is, you're always growing as a performer. There's always so much to learn." She admits that before she joined, she was not familiar with the group's music; "I'd never seen any of their shows...David (Downes, composer and music director of Celtic Woman) gave me a CD and some DVDs, and that was the first time I'd seen any of it."

However, "I knew about the success of Celtic Woman and was thrilled to join," she said. "It was an opportunity I couldn't say no to."

In 2009, Sharpe became a permanent member of Celtic Woman, in effect replacing Órla Fallon. She has said that "The other members have been really encouraging," and "They have such a history together. I've never been in anything with such a high profile; usually you're much more anonymous." She has toured with the ensemble on their 2009 'Isle of Hope' tour, and has recorded a CD and DVD with the group, both entitled Celtic Woman: Songs from the Heart, released in January 2010. The group toured North America from February to May 2010 on their 'Songs from the Heart' tour.

After the tour finished, Sharpe announced she would be leaving Celtic Woman to be with her family full-time. With the group she performed for President Obama and also at Radio City Music Hall. In early 2015 it was announced that she would rejoin Celtic Woman for two months (May and June) of their Tenth Anniversary tour. In 2018 Homecoming – Live from Ireland Tour, Alex Sharpe joined the group Celtic Woman as a temporary fill-in for Susan McFadden who was home for two weeks due to the death of her aunt.

=== Post-Celtic Woman ===
On 11 July 2016 it was announced that Sharpe was forming a new group called CaraNua with friend from Celtic Woman days Lynn Hilary. The direct translation of CaraNua is New Friend. It was chosen in part because it, not so commonly, sounds the same whether Irish or English letter sounds are used. The all Irish trio initially included Lynn Hilary and Edel Chan Murphy, both former singers of Celtic Woman and Riverdance. This trio made the album Favorite Hymns with Jason Tonioli, and the singles A Million Dreams (a cover from the award-winning soundtrack of The Greatest Showman), and Remember Me (a cover of the Oscar winning song from the movie Coco). Murphy's departure prompted the arrival of Lisa Nolan.

In 2017 Sharpe provided the vocal, in modern Irish Gaelic, for the traditional hymn Be Thou My Vision on Camille Nelson's, mainly instrumental, album "Lead Me Home." The album won the 2018 IMEA award for Christian/Gospel Album of the Year, and Be Thou My Vision was nominated for Christian/Gospel Song of the Year. In 2019 Sharpe again collaborated with Nelson on a cover of the Oscar winning Song into the West from Lord of the Rings: Return of the King.

== Personal life ==
Sharpe is the middle child and has two brothers. When asked where she developed her musical talent, she has said that "my granddad was a great one for singing songs and banging out tunes on the piano."

Sharpe is a member of The Church of Jesus Christ of Latter-day Saints (the only LDS member of Celtic Woman to date). She said, "I love 'Abide With Me' and 'I Know That My Redeemer Lives'...I love singing hymns. Music is a very powerful thing. I've heard it said that music prepares a man's soul to receive the gospel."

Sharpe is mother to a son, Jacob. "When I had my son, he became my passion in life", she said. "I tried to stay home and take work that wouldn't compromise my relationship with my son."

== Discography ==
=== Solo albums ===
- Be Still My Soul (2014)
- Broken by Design EP (February 2020)

=== Singles ===
- "Audition for a Charming Clown" (2014)
- "Wedding Song" (June 2019)

=== With CaraNua ===
==== Albums ====
- Favorite Hymns (November 2017)
- Evermore Park Vol. 1: The Soundtrack of Magical Lore (September 2018)
- Evermore Park Vol. 2: The Soundtrack of Cursed Lore (September 2018)
- Celtic Dreaming (2019)

==== Singles ====
- "Remember Me/Recuérdame" - lullaby from Coco (Celtic cover) (2018)
- "A Million Dreams" (Greatest Showman Cover) (January 2018)

=== Appearances ===
- Sacred Lullabies by Camille Nelson
- Lead Me Home by Camille Nelson
- Noel: Carols of Christmas Past by Jenny Oaks Baker
- Men? The Musical with various artists
- Songs from the Heart (CD & DVD) with Celtic Woman
- The Music of Shaun Purcell
- Cu Chulainn Cycle by Michael Scott
- Evita movie soundtrack
- Disciple by Damian Wilson
- Balor of the Evil Eye video game
- The Beautiful Game by Andrew Lloyd Webber
- Beatlemania by West End International
