= Silver Sea =

Studio album by Méav Ní Mhaolchatha
- Released: 2002
- Genre: Celtic fusion, new age
- Label: Celtic Collections
- Producer: Máire Breatnach; Méav

Méav Ní Mhaolchatha chronology
Méav (1998)	Silver Sea (2002)	Celtic Dreams (2006)

Silver Sea is the second studio album by Méav Ní Mhaolchatha, released in 2002 by Celtic Collections. It was re-released on February 1, 2011, on MRI.

== Track listing ==
All tracks are written by Méav, except where noted.

No.	Title	Writer(s)	Length
1.	"You Brought Me Up"	John Spillane	4:38
2.	"The Wicked Sister"		3:07
3.	"Morning in Béarra"	Traditional	3:33
4.	"Full Fathom Five"	Méav, Shakespeare	2:16
5.	"The Waves of Tory"		3:36
6.	"A Maid in Bedlam"	Traditional	2:26
7.	"The Cradles"		2:47
8.	"Newry Boat-Song"	Traditional	3:27
9.	"Martha’s Harbour"	Tim Bricheno, Andy Cousin, Julianne Regan	2:52
10.	"The Dark-Haired Girl"	Traditional	2:49
11.	"Port Na bPucaí"	Traditional	5:30
12.	"Silent O Moyle"	Traditional	2:51
13.	"Youkali Tango"	Roger Fernay, Kurt Weill	5:09
Total length:			45:01

== Personnel ==
Musicians

- David Agnew - Oboe
- Máire Breatnach - Viola, violin
- David James - Cello
- Eunan McDonald - Bass, bass guitar
- David Mckenna - Accordion
- Méav - Vocals
- Anne Marie O’Farrell - Harp
- Conor O’Reilly - Piano
- Colm Ó Snodaigh - Flute, low whistle, percussion
- Rónán Ó Snodaigh - Bodhran
- Rossa Ó Snodaigh - Percussion
- Russell Powell - Guitar
- Gavin Ralston - Guitar

Technical

- Máire Breatnach - Producer
- Brian Masterson - Engineer
- Méav - Producer
