= A Christmas Celebration (Celtic Woman album) =

Studio album by Celtic Woman
- Released: 3 October 2006
- Recorded: 2006
- Studios: Windmill Lane Studios, RTÉ Studio 1, Dublin, Ireland
- Genres: Celtic, new-age, Christmas
- Languages: English, Irish, Latin
- Label: Manhattan
- Producer: David Downes

Celtic Woman chronology
Celtic Woman (2005)	A Christmas Celebration (2006)	A New Journey (2007)

A Christmas Celebration is the second studio album released by the group Celtic Woman.

== Background ==
A Christmas Celebration was recorded in and released worldwide on 3 October 2006. The album, like the group's self-titled debut album, was produced and arranged by David Downes and features vocalists Chloë Agnew, Órla Fallon, Lisa Kelly, and Méav Ní Mhaolchatha, with violinist Máiréad Nesbitt.

In response to the reception earned for their following album, PBS concert special and DVD release A New Journey, a one-off live performance took place on 18 July 2007 at the Helix Theatre in Dublin, Ireland – the same location where the recording for the accompanying PBS concert special and DVD release for the group's debut album was held back in 2004. The concert began airing on PBS and was released on DVD in November 2007.

== Track listing ==
Note: All songs traditional, arranged by David Downes unless where noted.

No.	Title	Writer(s)	Performer(s)	Length
1.	"O Holy Night"		Chloë Agnew, Órla Fallon, Lisa Kelly, Máiréad Nesbitt, Méav Ní Mhaolchatha	4:25
2.	"Away in a Manger"		Fallon	2:31
3.	"Ding Dong! Merrily on High"		Agnew, Fallon, Kelly, Nesbitt, Ní Mhaolchatha	2:47
4.	"White Christmas"	Irving Berlin	Agnew, Kelly, Ní Mhaolchatha	3:22
5.	"Silent Night"		Nesbitt, Ní Mhaolchatha	3:25
6.	"Christmas Pipes"	Brendan Graham	Agnew, Fallon, Kelly, Nesbitt, Ní Mhaolchatha	3:52
7.	"The Christmas Song"	Robert Wells, Mel Tormé	Kelly	3:36
8.	"Carol of the Bells"		Nesbitt	2:19
9.	"Have Yourself a Merry Little Christmas"	Ralph Blane, Hugh Martin	Agnew, Fallon, Kelly, Nesbitt, Ní Mhaolchatha	2:27
10.	"Panis Angelicus"		Agnew	3:56
11.	"Don Oíche Úd i mBeithil (That Night in Bethlehem)"		Agnew, Fallon, Nesbitt, Ní Mhaolchatha	2:44
12.	"O Come All Ye Faithful"		Agnew, Fallon, Kelly, Nesbitt, Ní Mhaolchatha	3:51
13.	"The Little Drummer Boy"		Agnew, Fallon	3:47
14.	"The Wexford Carol"		Ní Mhaolchatha	3:04
15.	"Let it Snow!" (Special bonus track)	Jule Styne, Sammy Cahn	Agnew, Fallon, Kelly, Nesbitt, Ní Mhaolchatha	2:31

Bonus track on Japanese edition
No.	Title	Writer(s)	Performer(s)	Length
16.	"Beyond The Sea" (30-second commercial version)	Albert Lasry, Charles Trenet, Jack Lawrence	Agnew, Fallon, Kelly, Nesbitt, Ní Mhaolchatha	0:40

DVD
No.	Title	Writer(s)	Performer(s)	Length
1.	"Carol of the Bells"		Agnew, Fallon, Kelly, Nesbitt, Ní Mhaolchatha
2.	"Silent Night"		Nesbitt, Ní Mhaolchatha
3.	"White Christmas"	Irving Berlin	Agnew, Kelly, Ní Mhaolchatha
4.	"Away in a Manger"		Fallon
5.	"Ding Dong! Merrily on High"		Agnew, Fallon, Kelly, Nesbitt, Ní Mhaolchatha
6.	"The Little Drummer Boy"		Agnew, Fallon
7.	"The Christmas Song"	Robert Wells, Mel Tormé	Kelly
8.	"In the Bleak Midwinter"		Nesbitt
9.	"The First Noël"		Agnew, Fallon, Kelly, Nesbitt, Ní Mhaolchatha
10.	"The Wexford Carol"		Ní Mhaolchatha
11.	"Christmas Pipes"	Brendan Graham	Agnew, Fallon, Kelly, Nesbitt, Ní Mhaolchatha
12.	"O Holy Night"		Agnew, Fallon, Kelly, Nesbitt, Ní Mhaolchatha
13.	"Panis Angelicus"		Agnew
14.	"Green the Whole Year 'Round"	David Downes, Shay Healy	Kelly
15.	"Have Yourself a Merry Little Christmas"	Ralph Blane, Hugh Martin	Agnew, Fallon, Kelly, Nesbitt, Ní Mhaolchatha
16.	"Don Oíche Úd i mBeithil (That Night in Bethlehem)"		Agnew, Fallon, Nesbitt, Ní Mhaolchatha
17.	"O Come All Ye Faithful"		Agnew, Fallon, Kelly, Nesbitt, Ní Mhaolchatha
18.	"Let it Snow!"	Jule Styne, Sammy Cahn	Agnew, Fallon, Kelly, Nesbitt, Ní Mhaolchatha

== Personnel ==
=== Celtic Woman ===
- Chloë Agnew – vocals
- Órla Fallon – vocals, harp
- Lisa Kelly – vocals
- Méav Ní Mhaolchatha – vocals
- Máiréad Nesbitt – fiddle

=== Band ===
- David Downes – keyboards, piano, conductor
- Raymond Fean – percussion
- Nicholas Bailey – percussion
- Eoghan O'Niell – bass guitar
- Desmond Moore – guitars
- Russell Powell- guitar
- Martin Johnston – cello
- Andreja Malir – harp
- John O'Brien – uileann pipes, whistles

=== Aontas Choral Ensemble ===
- Rosemary Collier – director

=== The Irish Film Orchestra ===
- John Page – conductor
- Alan Smale – concertmaster

== Reception ==
Professional ratings
Review scores
Source	Rating
The Music Box	4/5 stars

== Chart history ==
=== Charts ===
Chart (2006)	Peak position
Belgian Albums (Ultratop Flanders)	83
Spanish Albums (Promusicae)	83
US Billboard 200	35
US World Albums (Billboard)	1
Chart (2007)	Peak position
Billboard Catalog Albums	3
Billboard Holidays Albums	5

=== Certifications ===
Region	Certification	Certified units/sales
Australia (ARIA)	Gold	7,500^{^}
United States (RIAA)	Platinum	1,000,000^{^}
^{^} Shipments figures based on certification alone.
