= Spanish Lady =

Traditional Irish folk song

"Spanish Lady" is a traditional Irish folk song, also found in England. The Bodleian Library has several broadsides of an English ballad with this name, one dating from the 17th century. Fragmentary or related versions from the US date from 1883. It is #542 in the Roud Folk Song Index. It should not be confused with "Spanish Ladies" or "Lady of Spain," both of which are entirely different songs. "Spanish Lady" is an etymological name for a female fairy, i.e. one of the little folk.

== Lyrics ==
The lyrics vary, depending on the provenance of the song, but all songs detail the singer observing the titular "Spanish Lady" as she goes through various activities. There are several Dublin versions, one of them usually called the Wheel of Fortune. Other Irish versions relate to Galway (called Galway City) and Belfast. An English version refers to Chester.

== Variations ==
There are other variations of the song, with some involving duels. The Irish singer Christy Moore recalls encountering the song in his youth and including it in his earliest repertoire. However, the version he encountered and used is quite different from the more widely known version made popular by artists such as The Dubliners.

== Covers ==
It has been covered by many artists, including Frank Harte (who sang two Dublin versions as well as an English one), The Dubliners, Gaelic Storm, Celtic Woman, Celtic Thunder (Emmet Cahill), Orthodox Celts, The Saw Doctors and Ronnie Drew and Dustin the Turkey (whose version went No. 1 on the Irish Singles Chart in 1994), and Shane MacGowan and the Popes. An a capella version was recorded by The Rising Pints (featuring Brian Cullen & Mark Renburke) on Another Round released in 1999.
