= Anúna =

Irish choral ensemble, led by Michael McGlynn

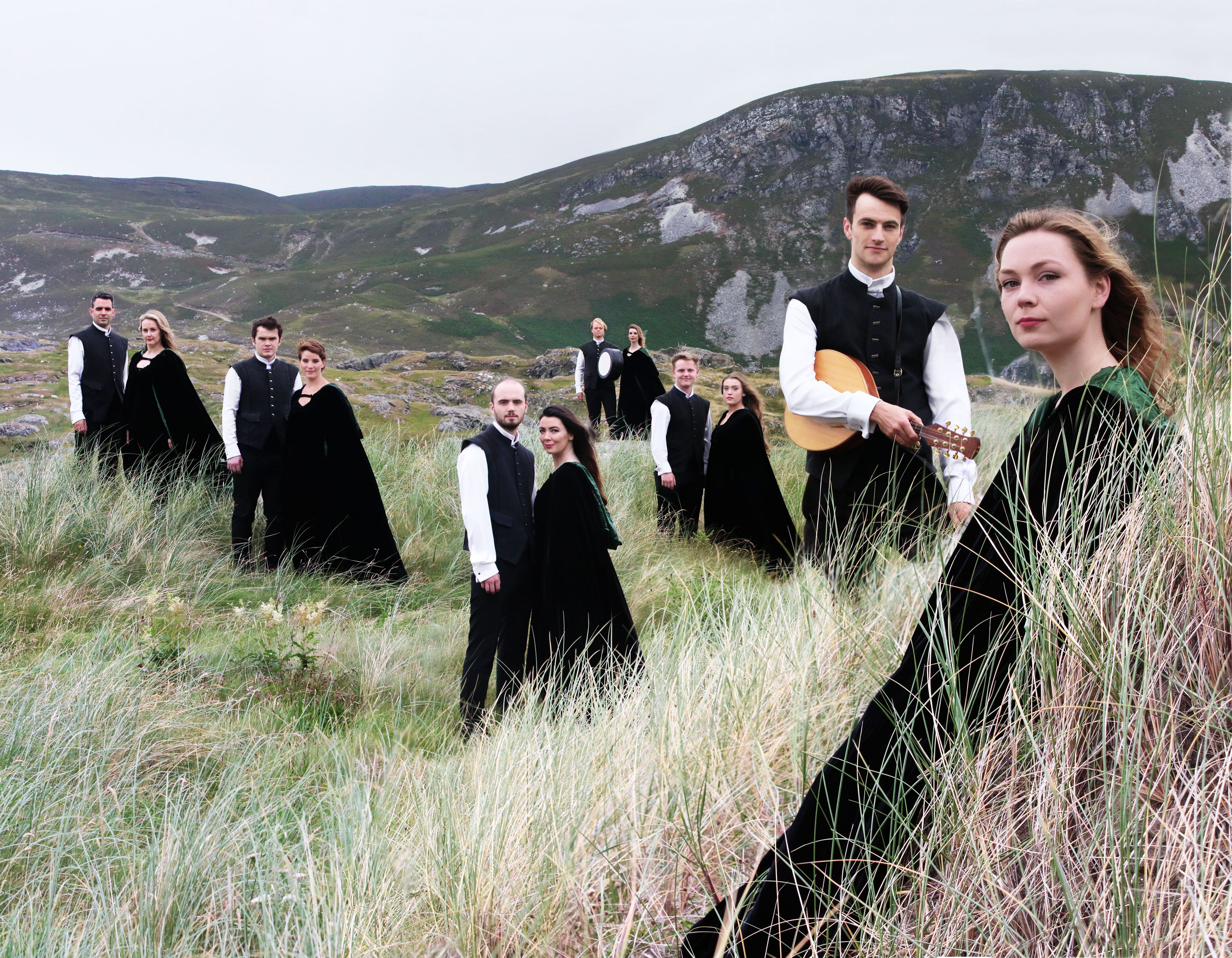

Background information
- Origin: Ireland
- Genres: Choral; early music; contemporary classical; Celtic music
- Years active: 1987–present
- Labels: Danú, Gimell, Universal, Koch, Valley, Elevation, E1
- Website: Anúna.ie

Anúna, generally stylised in all caps, is an Irish vocal ensemble founded in 1987 by composer Michael McGlynn, for whom it has served as the principal vehicle for the creation, performance, and recording of his choral music.

Originally founded as An Uaithne, the ensemble adopted the name Anúna in 1991. It became associated internationally with Riverdance during the mid-1990s but had already established an independent artistic identity centred on newly composed works by McGlynn alongside reimagined medieval, sacred, and traditional Irish material.

Critics have described the ensemble's music as drawing on early polyphony and Irish traditional sources through a contemporary compositional language, with unconducted performance practice and the spatial movement of singers through performance spaces as defining features.

Beyond conventional concert performance, the ensemble's work has included recordings, international touring, broadcast projects, and collaborations in theatre, film, and other media.

== History ==
=== Early development (1987–1994) ===
Michael McGlynn formed the vocal ensemble An Uaithne in 1987, following his involvement with collegiate choirs at TCD and University College Dublin and his early experience within Irish choral performance and direction. From its inception, the ensemble pursued a repertoire combining medieval sacred music, Irish-language texts, traditional material, and newly composed or arranged works by McGlynn, an approach that differed from prevailing Irish and British choral traditions.

Early performances under the name An Uaithne attracted critical attention in Dublin. Reviewing a concert at the House of Lords in 1990, The Irish Times noted the ensemble's presentation of early Irish and English repertoire, including medieval plainsong fragments, traditional songs, and Renaissance music, performed with voices and period and traditional instruments.

In September 1990, An Uaithne took part in the premiere of The Children of Lir by Patrick Cassidy at the National Concert Hall with the RTÉ Concert Orchestra.

A subsequent recital at Trinity College Dublin in 1991 was described as ranging from twelfth- to twentieth-century religious music and characterised by a distinctive sound shaped by the interaction of plainchant-derived melodic material and contemporary harmonic language in McGlynn's own compositions. Later the same year the ensemble adopted the shortened name Anúna.

The group's debut album, ANÚNA (Danú 001), was released in spring 1993 and consisted largely of works composed or arranged by McGlynn. Reviewing the album, The Irish Times highlighted the ensemble's handling of medieval chant and sacred sources and praised the atmospheric qualities achieved through acoustic setting and vocal treatment, while expressing reservations about several arrangements of traditional songs.

A second album, Invocation, recorded in 1994, was reviewed later that year as fulfilling and extending the promise of the group's early work, describing Anúna as having developed into one of Ireland's most innovative choral ensembles. That year Anúna performed on the soundtrack to the animated film Thumbelina, with music by Barry Manilow, recorded at Windmill Lane Studios in Dublin.

By the end of 1994, The Irish Times characterised Anúna as having established a distinct position within Irish musical life, noting that while the group drew on medieval and traditional sources, its performances avoided both academic reconstruction and commercial pastiche, instead emphasising sound, space, and atmosphere.

=== Riverdance, recordings, and international recognition (1995–1999) ===
From 1994 to 1996, Anúna were involved in Riverdance from its initial presentation at the Eurovision Song Contest in Dublin through its development into a full stage production, appearing as part of the touring ensemble during the show's early international run, including performances at Radio City Music Hall in New York; the ensemble sang the opening section, known as "Cloudsong", with soloist Katie McMahon.

In February 1995, The Irish Times reported that Anúna would not appear on the forthcoming Riverdance soundtrack album despite continuing to perform in the show. Bill Whelan said that the group had not been available on the terms offered and that Seolta had been used on the recording instead; Michael McGlynn disputed that account and said that Anúna would have appeared on several tracks. The initial 1995 issue of Riverdance: Music from Riverdance the Show credited Seolta on the relevant tracks. A revised 1996 issue, Riverdance: Music from the Show, featured Anúna and was released internationally; the album won the Grammy Award for Best Musical Show Album at the 39th Annual Grammy Awards in 1997.

In 1996, Anúna soprano Eimear Quinn won the Eurovision Song Contest performing "The Voice", representing Ireland.

During the mid-1990s, the ensemble expanded its recording catalogue alongside its growing public profile. Omnis (1995) was described by The Irish Times as presenting Anúna at the height of its collective powers, while Deep Dead Blue (1996), later released internationally in 1999 following the group's signing to the specialist vocal label Gimell, home to The Tallis Scholars, was characterised by Billboard as the group's most accomplished work to date, noting its distinctive approach to choral sound and performance. In August 1999, Deep Dead Blue entered the UK Classical Specialist chart at number three.

In 1997, Anúna released Behind the Closed Eye, a collaboration with the Ulster Orchestra that marked a departure from the ensemble's predominantly a cappella work and expanded its sound into an orchestral context.

Anúna collaborated with The Chieftains on several recordings during the 1990s. In 1995, they performed with Sting on the track "Mo Ghile Mear (Our Hero)" from The Long Black Veil, which was nominated for Best Contemporary Folk Album at the 38th Annual Grammy Awards in 1996. In 1998, Anúna appeared as guest performers on the track "Long Journey Home", recorded with Elvis Costello, which served as the theme for the PBS documentary series The Irish in America: Long Journey Home; the accompanying album The Long Journey Home won the Grammy Award for Best Traditional Folk Album at the 41st Annual Grammy Awards in 1999. Anúna also contributed vocals to "Never Give All the Heart" on Tears of Stone (1999), which featured spoken narration by Brenda Fricker.

Media and broadcast activity during the late 1990s included an appearance on Later... with Jools Holland on BBC Two in December 1996 and collaboration with Secret Garden on the album Dawn of a New Century, with The Washington Post noting the role of Anúna's choral textures.

Anúna performed as part of the BBC Proms at the Royal Albert Hall, an appearance highlighted by Elvis Costello as his "Hot Ticket" of the 1999 London Proms.

=== Recordings and international activity (2000–2009) ===
Entering the 2000s, the ensemble continued to develop a repertoire centred on medieval and sacred source material alongside newly composed works. Reviewing Cynara (2000), The Irish Times emphasised the album's atmospheric focus and tonal control, while Télérama situated the recording at the intersection of ancient and contemporary practice, drawing attention to its use of early texts and its contemplative character.

In January 2000, Anúna appeared at the Celtic Connections festival in Glasgow, performing at the Glasgow Royal Concert Hall. In 2003, the ensemble performed at the Tampere Vocal Music Festival in Finland. Winter Songs (2002) was reviewed by The New York Times and subsequently issued in the United States as Christmas Songs on the Koch label; the ensemble also appeared at Proms in the Park in Belfast with the Ulster Orchestra that year.

Released in 2002, the compilation Essential Anúna entered the UK Classical Artist chart at number six in February 2003.

In 2004, Anúna performed at official diplomatic receptions in Argentina and Chile during a state visit by Irish President Mary McAleese. In 2005, Anúna appeared on The Chieftains' Live from Dublin: A Tribute to Derek Bell, performing "Fionnghuala"; the album was nominated for Best Traditional Folk Album at the 48th Annual Grammy Awards. Sensation (2006) was reviewed as darker and more inward-looking than earlier releases, incorporating literary text settings and spoken narration; the album's title track featured spoken narration by Gilles Servat. By the later 2000s, the ensemble's international activity included concert performances in Japan; a feature in Nikkei Premium Life (December 2007) characterised the group's music as drawing on medieval sacred song and emphasising contemplative listening.

In 2007, Anúna released the concert recording Anúna: Celtic Origins, recorded at Trinity Cathedral in Cleveland, Ohio, and broadcast nationally on PBS. Billboard reported that the release and accompanying broadcast formed the centrepiece of the ensemble's expanded North American touring activity during this period.

In 2008, Christmas Memories was produced as a PBS television special, recorded at Maryland Public Television, and released on CD and DVD. The album entered the Billboard World Music chart at number six in November 2008.

In July 2009, Anúna performed with the RTÉ National Symphony Orchestra at the National Concert Hall in Dublin in a concert presented as a celebration of the music of Michael McGlynn. The decade concluded with Sanctus (2009), described by The Irish Times as marking a renewed emphasis on sacred repertoire, and the Japanese release of the DVD Invocations of Ireland.

=== International activity and collaborations (2010–2019) ===
In July 2010, Anúna performed with the RTÉ National Symphony Orchestra at the National Concert Hall, Dublin, with Finnish violinist Linda Lampenius as featured soloist, in a programme that included new works and arrangements by Michael McGlynn.

In January 2011, the ensemble joined Clannad in concert at Christ Church Cathedral, Dublin as part of Temple Bar TradFest. That year Anúna contributed vocal performances to the Christmas album It's Always Christmas With You! by The Wiggles. At the end of 2011, Anúna toured Japan with concerts and workshops; during the visit, the ensemble travelled to the Tōhoku region and worked with children from areas affected by the 2011 earthquake and tsunami.

In 2011, Anúna inaugurated the Anúna International Choral Summer School at the National Concert Hall in Dublin; it continued at Dublin venues through the decade.

In April 2012, Anúna participated in the premiere of Philip Hammond's Requiem for the Lost Souls of the Titanic at St Anne's Cathedral, Belfast as part of the centenary commemorations of the sinking of the Titanic. Also that year, the group featured on the soundtrack to the video game Diablo III, the score of which was later nominated for a BAFTA award in the Original Music category; composer Russell Brower stated that Anúna was selected for its distinctive choral sound suited to the game's atmosphere. The ensemble also released Illumination in 2012 as part of its twenty-fifth anniversary output, with a substantially revised version later issued as Illuminations.

Anúna appeared at the London A Cappella Festival at Kings Place in 2015, where critics noted the ensemble's contrasting approach to a cappella performance, characterised by stillness and an emphasis on atmosphere. They performed at the National Centre for the Performing Arts in Beijing in August 2015. Reviewing Revelation (2015), The Irish Times described it as one of the ensemble's more texturally rich recordings, noting its emphasis on original material by McGlynn alongside early Christian texts and Japanese-influenced works.

In March 2017, Anúna marked its thirtieth anniversary with a concert at the National Concert Hall, Dublin, attended by Michael D. Higgins, President of Ireland. Also in 2017, Anúna participated in Takahime, a full-scale Noh theatre production at Bunkamura Orchard Hall in Tokyo, marking the centenary of W. B. Yeats's At the Hawk's Well. Anúna provided the choral music, composed and directed by Michael McGlynn in collaboration with Noh master Umewaka Genshō of the Kanze school. The Japan Times situated the project within the established Noh repertoire, while the specialist journal Music Magazine treated it as a significant contemporary engagement between Noh and non-Japanese musical traditions.

International concert and media activity during this period also included participation in the Xenogears 20th Anniversary Concert in Japan in 2018, with recordings subsequently issued as part of the official anniversary project, and television appearances on Nippon Television in 2019.

=== Activity during and after the COVID-19 period (2020–2025) ===
During the COVID-19 pandemic, Anúna adapted its activity towards filmed performance and broadcast projects. ANÚNA: On a Cold Winter's Night, a 50-minute filmed Christmas concert recorded by candlelight in St Bartholomew's Church, Dublin, was first broadcast by TG4 on Christmas Eve 2020 and rebroadcast during its Christmas schedule in 2021; it was also broadcast by Sweden's SVT under the title Julkonsert från Irland.

In 2020, Anúna participated in VOCES8 Live from London, contributing a filmed programme titled ANÚNA: A Whisper of Paradise, recorded in St Bartholomew's Church. Reviewing the series, The Arts Desk drew attention to the programme's integration of choral performance with visual imagery, while Seen and Heard International emphasised the ensemble's unconducted performance practice and the relationship between music, architecture, and filmed presentation.

In November 2022, specialist choral coverage reported that Anúna's concerts at St Bartholomew's Church on 3 December would be the ensemble's final public performances in the Republic of Ireland. The ensemble stated that it would continue to perform elsewhere, including in Northern Ireland, and would maintain its touring and recording activity. Reviewing Otherworld the following year, The Irish Times critic Tony Clayton-Lea noted that McGlynn had announced a year earlier that Anúna would no longer perform in Ireland and observed that the announcement had attracted little public response.

The studio album Otherworld was released in 2023 and described by The Irish Times as resisting easy categorisation and continuing the ensemble's long-standing artistic independence. The album included four tracks by Yasunori Mitsuda from the video game Xenoblade Chronicles 2; a Japanese edition was released in September 2024.

Anúna performed at St Anne's Cathedral, Belfast on 15 March 2024 as part of Belfast TradFest, recorded and subsequently broadcast by BBC Radio Ulster and BBC Radio Foyle under the title Anúna Live in Concert.

In December 2024, Anúna presented Yuki Onna (雪女) at Sumida Triphony Hall in Tokyo as part of the ensemble's first Japan tour in ten years. Based on the short story by Lafcadio Hearn, the programme combined choral music with elements of Noh theatre and featured guest performers Reijiro Tsumura (Noh), Tamami Tono (shō), and Mitsuhiro Kakihara (ōtsuzumi). The music was composed and directed by Michael McGlynn, with production by Keiko Kawashima.

In 2025, Anúna released the studio album Eilífð, which was described by The Arts Desk as blending vocal traditions and by Irish Music Magazine as atmospheric in character.

== Related ensembles ==
M'ANAM is a male vocal ensemble founded in 2018. Its debut album, M'ANAM, was released in 2019 and reviewed in The Irish Times. A preview in the same paper described it as an eight-voice male vocal group, featuring singers from Ireland and Iceland, with repertoire extending from medieval material to traditional song. In January 2020, M'ANAM appeared with Anúna at the Celtic Connections festival in Glasgow. The ensemble has also appeared at international vocal festivals, including HarbourVOICES! in St John's, Newfoundland and Belfast International Arts Festival in 2025.

Systir is a vocal ensemble centred on female voices, established in 2019. In a 2025 feature, The Irish News described the group as blending contemporary music with medieval and Irish traditional roots and noted its continuation after a major line-up change in 2023. Concert activity in the mid-2020s included performances in Japan, China, and Iceland, including an appearance in Shanghai as part of the China Shanghai International Arts Festival and a concert at Hannesarholt in Reykjavík in May 2025.

== Musical style ==
Anúna's musical style has been described as a contemporary reimagining of medieval and traditional Irish materials rather than an attempt at historical reconstruction. Writing in The Irish Times, Michael Dervan noted that although the ensemble drew on medieval and traditional sources, its work was shaped by a contemporary sensibility that avoided both academic reconstruction and commercial pastiche. Liam Fay similarly wrote in Hot Press that McGlynn drew on monophonic chant and traditional Irish song but was not interested in reconstructing how the music might once have sounded, but in what it could say in the present.

In Die Musik Irlands im 20. Jahrhundert, Axel Klein identified the principal influences on McGlynn's musical language as Gesualdo, Machaut, Dufay, Debussy, Messiaen, selected American minimalists, Irish traditional music, and the pop music of David Bowie and Kate Bush, observing that the music of the baroque and romantic periods had no relevance for him, and characterised the resulting style as combining early polyphony with impressionistic harmonic colour, with triple groupings and frequent metre changes as recurrent rhythmic features. Reviewing Invocation, Nuala O'Connor described passages as angular to the point of dissonance, with complex vocal writing and a cathedral-like acoustic effect, while praising the ensemble's collective precision and tautness.

The ensemble's vocal sound has been treated as a defining feature of its style. The Companion to Irish Traditional Music states that Anúna developed a distinctive vocal sound by combining trained and untrained voices. Dervan described the resulting aesthetic as placing primary emphasis on sound, space and atmosphere rather than conventional choral blend or orthodox vocal technique, and later characterised the ensemble's sound as shaped by resonance, colour and atmosphere rather than orthodox blend.

Performance practice has been a further defining feature of Anúna's work. The Companion to Irish Traditional Music states that McGlynn developed a form of choral writing intended to be sung unconducted, combining melodic features of sean-nós with medieval and contemporary harmonies, and notes that the ensemble developed a performance technique incorporating costumes, ritualised movement and candles. The Encyclopaedia of Music in Ireland similarly identifies cantor and response, mobile singers and spatialised sound as characteristic features of the ensemble's presentation. Dervan wrote that singers frequently moved through performance spaces, surrounding audiences and altering the acoustic perspective, giving the music an immersive and ritualised quality that placed the ensemble outside most conventional choral categories. Writing in Music Magazine, Shinya Matsuyama emphasised that spatiality and physical movement were as important to Anúna's music as melody and harmony, with singers moving through performance spaces to create an enveloping sound-world and a ritualised listening experience.

== Members ==
Anúna has worked with a large number of singers since its foundation in 1987. Participation varies by project and performance period rather than through fixed long-term membership. In 2001, Liam Fay reported that more than 65 singers had passed through the ensemble during the previous five years.

Founder members included Monica Donlon, Caitríona Ó Leary, Miriam Blennerhassett, and Fionnuala Gill.

Among singers associated with the ensemble in later years are Lucy Champion, John McGlynn, and Sara Weeda.

Several former members later developed independent musical careers, including Eimear Quinn, who won the Eurovision Song Contest in 1996 while a member of the ensemble, Andrew Hozier-Byrne, Julie Feeney, Méav Ní Mhaolchatha, Lynn Hilary, and Éabha McMahon.

== Discography ==
=== Studio albums ===
- 1993 – ANÚNA; Billboard Top World Music Albums peak 11
- 1994 – Invocation
- 1995 – Omnis
- 1996 – Omnis (international release)
- 1996 – Deep Dead Blue; UK Classical Artist Albums Chart peak 3
- 1997 – Behind the Closed Eye
- 2000 – Cynara
- 2002 – ANÚNA 2002 (re-recording of 1993 album)
- 2006 – Sensation
- 2009 – Sanctus
- 2012 – Illumination
- 2015 – Revelation
- 2023 – Otherworld
- 2025 – Eilífð

=== Live albums ===
- 2005 – Live at Annedal (Zebra Art Records)
- 2007 – Celtic Origins (Elevation); released as CD and DVD; PBS broadcast
- 2008 – Christmas Memories (Elevation); released as CD and DVD; based on the stage show Anúna Christmas Memories, produced by Maryland Public Television; Billboard Top World Music Albums peak 6; Billboard 200 peak 95; single "Ding Dong Merrily on High" peak 26 on the Billboard Hot Adult Contemporary Tracks chart
- 2025 – A Whisper of Paradise; released as film; broadcast by TG4 in Ireland at Christmas 2025

=== Compilations ===
- 2002 – Winter Songs
- 2002 – Essential ANÚNA (Universal Classics & Jazz, UK/Ireland); UK Classical Artist Albums Chart peak 6
- 2008 – Invocations of Ireland (DVD); released in Japan on Columbia Music Entertainment
- 2025 – Tochairm

=== Recorded collaborations ===
- With Barry Manilow – music recorded for the animated film Thumbelina (1994)
- With The Chieftains and Sting – "Mo Ghile Mear" from the album The Long Black Veil (1995)
- With the RTÉ Concert Orchestra, Davy Spillane (uilleann pipes), Kenneth Edge (saxophone), Máire Breathnach (violin), and Noel Eccles (percussion) – Riverdance (1994)
- Riverdance: Music from the Show (1996); the album featured Anúna and won the Grammy Award for Best Musical Show Album at the 39th Annual Grammy Awards in 1997.
- With the Ulster Orchestra – Behind the Closed Eye (1997)
- With The Chieftains and Elvis Costello – "Long Journey Home", title track of the album Long Journey Home (1998)
- With The Chieftains and Brenda Fricker – "Never Give All The Heart" from Tears of Stone (1999)
- With Secret Garden – "I Know a Rose Tree": also available on their albums Dawn of a New Century (1999), Once in a Red Moon (2002) and the DVD A Night with Secret Garden (2000)
- With The Chieftains – "Fionnghuala" from Live from Dublin: A Tribute to Derek Bell (2005); the album was nominated for Best Traditional Folk Album at the 48th Annual Grammy Awards.
- With Moya Brennan and Iarla Ó Lionáird – "Is Mise 'n Ghaoth" from Music of Ireland: Welcome Home (2010)
- With The Wiggles – "The Cherry Tree Carol", "The Little Drummer Boy", "Ding Dong Merrily on High" and "We Three Kings" from the CD and DVD It's Always Christmas With You! (2011)
- With Yasunori Mitsuda – Xenogears Original Soundtrack Revival Disc –the first and the last– (2018)
