= Mo Ghile Mear =

Irish song

"Mo Ghile Mear" (translated "My Gallant Darling", "My Spirited Lad" and variants) is an Irish song. The modern form of the song was composed in the early 1970s by Dónal Ó Liatháin (1934–2008), using a traditional air collected in Cúil Aodha, County Cork, and lyrics selected from Irish-language poems by Seán "Clárach" Mac Domhnaill (1691–1754).

== History ==
The lyrics are partially based on Bímse Buan ar Buairt Gach Ló ("My Heart is Sore with Sorrow Deep", c. 1746), a lament of the failure of the Jacobite rising of 1745. The original poem is in the voice of the personification of Ireland, Éire, lamenting the exile of Bonnie Prince Charlie. Mo ghile mear is a term applied to the Pretender in numerous Jacobite songs of the period. O'Daly (1866) reports that many of the Irish Jacobite songs were set to the tune The White Cockade. This is in origin a love song of the 17th century, the "White Cockade" (cnotadh bán) being an ornament of ribbons worn by young women, but the term was re-interpreted to mean a military cockade in the Jacobite context.

Another part of the lyrics is based in an earlier Jacobite poem by Mac Domhnaill, Seal do bhíos im mhaighdin shéimh. This was published in Edward Walsh's Irish Popular Songs (Dublin, 1847) under the title of "Air Bharr na gCnoc 'san Ime gCéin — Over the Hills and Far Away". Walsh notes that this poem was "said to be the first Jacobite effort" by Mac Domhnaill, written during the Jacobite rising of 1715, so that here the exiled hero is the "Old Pretender", James Francis Edward Stuart.

The composition of the modern song is associated with composer Seán Ó Riada, who established an Irish-language choir in Cúil Aodha, County Cork, in the 1960s. The tune to which it is now set was collected by Ó Riada from an elderly resident of Cúil Aodha called Domhnall Ó Buachalla. Ó Riada died prematurely in 1971, and the song was composed about a year after his death, in c. 1972, with Ó Riada himself now becoming the departed hero lamented in the text. The point of departure for the song was the tape recording of Domhnall Ó Buachalla singing the tune. Ó Riada's son Peadar suggested to Dónal Ó Liatháin that he should make a song from this melody.

Ó Liatháin decided to select verses from Mac Domhnaill's poem and set them to the tune. He chose those that were the most "universal", so that the modern song is no longer an explicit reference to the Jacobite rising but in its origin a lament for the death of Seán Ó Riada.

== Recordings ==
- Mary Black – Collected, 1984
- James Last – James Last in Ireland, 1986 (vocals by Séamus Mac Mathúna)
- Relativity – Relativity, 1985
- Pádraigín Ní Uallacháin – A Stór Is A Stóirín, 1994
- The Chieftains & Sting – The Long Black Veil, 1995
- Orla Fallon – My Land, 2011
- Battlefield Band – Beg and Borrow, 2015 (Scottish Gaidhlig translation)
- Úna Palliser – used in a Specsavers advert
