= Órla Fallon =

Irish singer and songwriter, formerly of Anúna and Celtic Woman

- Born: Órlagh Fallon; 24 August 1974 (age 51); Knockananna, County Wicklow, Ireland
- Genres: Celtic; new-age
- Occupations: Singer; harpist
- Instruments: Vocals; harp
- Labels: Celtic Collections; Manhattan
- Website: www.orlafallon.com

Órlagh "Orla" Fallon (born 24 August 1974) is an Irish singer, songwriter and former member of the group Celtic Woman and the chamber choir Anúna.

== Early life and education ==
Fallon was born in Knockananna, Ireland. She plays the harp and sings traditional Irish music, most often in the Irish language. Fallon studied at Mater Dei Institute of Education, in Dublin. She has performed for the Pope and the President of Ireland and at Carnegie Hall.

== Career ==
=== Early career ===
Fallon auditioned for Michael McGlynn and later joined Anúna.

Her debut album, The Water is Wide, was released in Europe in 2000 and in North America in 2006. In 2005, she was featured on The Duggans album Rubicon along with peers Moya Brennan and other members of Clannad.

=== Celtic Woman ===
In 2004, Fallon sent a demo offer to composer David Downes, who was then working on the concept of Celtic Woman. Due to her unique vocal abilities, Downes contacted Fallon and asked if she would like to be a part of Celtic Woman, then only envisaged to be a one-night show. She agreed and became one of the founding members of the group as a singer and harpist.

Fallon was featured in the self-titled debut album Celtic Woman, Celtic Woman: A Christmas Celebration and Celtic Woman: A New Journey as well as in the tie-in PBS television specials and DVDs filmed in 2004, 2007, and 2006 respectively. She also toured with the group in 2005 on the inaugural North American Tour, the 2006-07 A New Journey tour, and again in 2007–08 on the second A New Journey tour.

She wrote a song called Shooting Star for herself and performed it in the 2005 and 2006 Celtic Woman tours.

In 2009, Fallon announced that she would be leaving Celtic Woman to have a full break and spend time with her family and was replaced as a member of Celtic Woman by actress and vocalist Alex Sharpe.

=== Post-Celtic Woman ===
In 2009, Fallon appeared as a guest vocalist on Jim Brickman's "It's a Beautiful World" tour and PBS special and released her second album Distant Shore (which included her own Shooting Star song) in September of that year. This was followed in March 2010 with her third album Music of Ireland: Welcome Home. In December 2010, Fallon released a PBS Celtic Christmas special and tie-in CD, titled Órla Fallon's Celtic Christmas, the first time any former Celtic Woman member had starred in their own PBS special. In this special, as well as Fallon's own songs, there were also songs which featured a few guest singers, including former fellow Celtic Woman member Méav Ní Mhaolchatha, in which they sang a duet together ("Do you hear what I hear"), and American Idol runner up David Archuleta, who joined Fallon on stage to perform "Silent Night", "Patapan", and the finale song of "Here we come A-Wassailing", which Ní Mhaolchatha was also featured in. This was the second Christmas album she recorded, the first being Winter, Fire & Snow: A Celtic Christmas Collection in September 2010.

In March 2011, Fallon released another album, Órla Fallon: My Land, which tied in with another PBS special. Both PBS specials were produced by The Elevation Group and WNET. Another solo album, Lullaby Time, was released in 2012.

== Personal life ==
She has been married to John Comerford since 1997 and has a son named Freddie, who was born in 2012.

== Discography ==
Solo

- The Water is Wide (2000 EURO) (2006 U.S.)
- Distant Shore (September 2009)
- Music of Ireland: Welcome Home (March 2010)
- Winter, Fire & Snow: A Celtic Christmas Collection (September 2010)
- Órla Fallon's Celtic Christmas (November 2010)
- Órla Fallon: My Land (March 2011)
- Lullaby Time (2012)
- Sweet By and By (March 2017)
- A Winter's Tale (October 2019)
- Lore (July 2020)
- Abide with Me: Celtic Hymns and Songs of Faith (2022)

With Celtic Woman

- Celtic Woman (March 2005)
- Celtic Woman: A Christmas Celebration (October 2006)
- Celtic Woman: A New Journey (January 2007)
- Celtic Woman: The Greatest Journey (October 2008)
- Celtic Woman: Solo (May 2015)
- Celtic Woman: Christmas (2015)
- Celtic Woman: The Best of Christmas (November 2017)
- Celtic Woman: Celebration: 15 Years of Music and Magic (February 2020)

With Jim Brickman

- Beautiful World (2009)

With The Duggans

- Rubicon (2005)
