= Méav Ní Mhaolchatha =

- Born: 26 January; Dublin, Ireland
- Education: Trinity College Dublin
- Occupations: Singer; songwriter
- Years active: 1994–present
- Spouse: Tom Clinch
- Children: 2, including Catherine Clinch
- Musical career
- Genres: Celtic; folk; classical
- Instruments: Vocals; harp; piano
- Labels: Celtic Collections; Manhattan; Warner Music
- Formerly of: Celtic Woman; Anúna
- Website: www.meav.ie

Méav Ní Mhaolchatha (/ˈmeɪv niː ˈweɪlxəhɑː/ MAYV nee WAYL-khə-hah, Irish: [ˈmʲeːw n̠ʲiː ˈwiːlˠəxəhə]), mononymously known as Méav, is an Irish singer, songwriter and recording artist specialising in the traditional music of her homeland. She was one of the original soloists in the musical ensemble Celtic Woman, which has sold over six million albums. Her solo albums have reached the Billboard World Music Top 10. She sings in multiple languages: English, Irish, French, Latin, Italian and German.

== Music career ==
In 1993, she graduated from Trinity College Dublin with a law degree. Shortly after, she began singing professionally.

Between 1994 and 1998, Méav was a member of the Irish chamber choir Anúna. As a choral singer and soloist, she recorded four albums with Anúna: Omnis (1995), Omnis Special Edition (1996), Deep Dead Blue (1996), and Behind the Closed Eye (1997). In 2006, a collection of her solo and choral work with Anúna, Celtic Dreams, was released on Valley Entertainment Records. She appeared as a member of Anúna in Riverdance: The Show.

She subsequently toured the United States as a soloist with the Irish RTÉ Concert Orchestra. She also toured South Africa as a soloist with Lord of the Dance.

She recorded her first and eponymous solo album in 1999.

Méav gained musical stardom as a founding member of the group Celtic Woman in 2004 and is featured on three CDs, Celtic Woman, Celtic Woman: A Christmas Celebration, and Celtic Woman: A New Journey. In 2005, Méav was expecting her first child and took maternity leave to await the birth of her first daughter, Anna. During tours, she was replaced by Irish singer Deirdre Shannon. She has been featured in Celtic Woman: The Greatest Journey Essential Collection.

In 2007, following the filming of Celtic Woman's Christmas DVD at the Helix, Dublin, Méav left Celtic Woman to concentrate on her solo career.

In 2009, she returned to the stage performing in her native Dublin to rave reviews. She also gave birth to her second daughter Catherine and recorded "Where the Sunbeams Play" for the Disney film Tinker Bell and the Lost Treasure.

In 2010, she was a special guest of Órla Fallon's Celtic Christmas concert in Nashville singing "Do You Hear What I Hear?" in a duet with Fallon, her solo version of "O Holy Night" accompanied by harp and the finale song "Here We Come A-wassailing" with the rest of the cast including American singing stars David Archuleta and Vince Gill, recorded, aired on PBS and released on CD and DVD.

Méav participated in a concert of world music at Chambord Castle, France, entitled "Divinas", along with Yulia Townsend and Persian-born Israeli singer Rita.

Méav was also featured as a guest soloist on the Celtic Woman Christmas album Home for Christmas. She appeared in the Celtic Woman PBS special, Home for Christmas, which was recorded on 7 August 2013.

In January 2012, Méav took part in the television special, Quest Beyond the Stars which took place at Abbey Road Studios, London.

She released a new solo album, The Calling, on Warner Music in Autumn 2013.

Meav again rejoined Celtic Woman temporarily for their North American 10th anniversary tour from 6 March to Easter 2015.

Méav rejoined Celtic Woman as their vocal director for their 2018 Homecoming album.

== Personal life ==
She and her husband, Tom Clinch, have two daughters. At age 12, their daughter Catherine Clinch won the Best Actress Award at the 2022 IFTAs for her lead role in Colm Bairéad's Irish-language film An Cailín Ciúin, released in 2022.

== Discography ==
Solo albums

Title	Release	Record label
Méav	1999	Celtic Collections
Silver Sea	2002	Celtic Collections
A Celtic Journey	2006	Manhattan Records
Celtic Dreams	2006	Valley Entertainment
The Calling	2013	Warner Music Group

With Celtic Woman

All albums are released through Manhattan Records

Title	Release	Notes
Celtic Woman	2005	
A Christmas Celebration	2006	
A New Journey	2007	
Celtic Woman: The Greatest Journey	2008	Compilation album
Lullaby	2011	Compilation album
Home for Christmas	2012	
Decade: The Songs, The Show, The Traditions, The Classics	2015	Compilation album
Solo	2015	Compilation album
Destiny	2015	
Christmas	2015	Compilation album
Voices of Angels	2016	
The Best of Christmas	2017	Compilation album
Celebration: 15 Years of Music and Magic	2020	Compilation album
20 Anniversary	2023	

With Yulia and Rita

Title	Release	Record label
Divinas: Live at Chambord Castle	2013	Decca Records
