= David Downes (Irish composer) =

Irish composer, musical director

- Born: Dublin, Ireland
- Occupations: composer, musical director
- Known for: Riverdance, Celtic Woman
- Notable work: original songs for Celtic Woman
- Awards: Emmy nomination

David Downes is a composer, pianist, producer, and music director who is known for both contemporary composition as well as work in the commercial field, particularly with Riverdance and as founder of Celtic Woman.

== Career ==
David Downes was born in Dublin, Ireland. He graduated from Trinity College, Dublin where he studied Music and Composition. He has performed at venues around the world, including Boston Symphony Hall, Carnegie Hall and Wembley Arena, appearing with soloists James Galway and Alan Stivell, the group Boyzone, and the Washington Symphony, Moravian Philharmonic, Hollywood Studio Symphony and National Symphony orchestras. He has made recordings with Moya Brennan, Clannad, Michael Crawford, Michael W. Smith and Bill Whelan. He has acted as orchestrator for Riverdance on Broadway and Secret Garden most notably.

He joined Riverdance where he was Music Director on Broadway, as well as for the American and European touring companies. Later he and Sharon Browne formed 'Celtic Woman', which has toured across the world with platinum recordings in the US, Australia, Japan, South Africa, and major following in Asia, Europe and South America.

He acted as musical director for Irish President Mary McAleese's Inauguration in 2004. He has performed for U.S. Presidents Bill Clinton, George W. Bush and Barack Obama.

He recently composed a new contemporary work for piano, cello and spoken word in collaboration with poet Adam Wyeth, entitled there will be no silence, which was performed and recorded by Rolf Hind, Adrian Mantu and actors Aisling O'Sullivan and Owen Roe.

== Musicography ==
=== Original songs ===
Downes has written many original songs for Celtic Woman, including: The Soft Goodbye, Send Me a Song, One World, The Sky and the Dawn and the Sun, At the Céili, Sing Out!, Granuaile's Dance, The Lost Rose Fantasia, The Blessing, The Call, Green the Whole Year Round, Walking The Night and Tabhair Dom Do Lamh. The lyricists with whom he has collaborated most frequently are Caitríona Ní Dhúill, Barry McCrea, Shay Healy and Brendan Graham.

=== Television, film and theatre ===
His credits include Thou Shalt Not Kill, The Enemy Within, The Hunt For Red Willie at the Peacock Theatre, Jeff Daniels's Escanaba in da Moonlight and The Shaughraun at the Abbey Theatre in Dublin and London's West End. He produced opening and closing songs, as well as acting as choral arranger for the Disney movie Tinkerbell and the Lost Treasure. Also, he has been working on a drama, which is based on the Easter Rising of 1916, featuring Lisa Lambe and Malcolm Sinclair, known as The Bloody Irish. He recently composed the music for the Irish Repertory Theatre New York's staging of Marina Carr's The Cordelia Dream and worked as performer, arranger and orchestrator on the recent Riverdance: An Animated Adventure movie.

=== Work with other artists ===
In 2007, Downes helped former Celtic Woman member Hayley Westenra to record The Last Rose of Summer for her album Treasure. The song was sung as a duet by Westenra and another member of Celtic Woman, Méav Ní Mhaolchatha, while Downes led the orchestra. He has worked with singer Bryan Adams through his foundation.

== Awards ==
Celtic Woman albums have been credited platinum in many countries, and the DVDs of their TV concerts multi-platinum, in some cases, with notable popularity in the United States, Canada, Australia, Japan, Germany, France, Austria and South Africa.

In 2010 Downes was nominated for an EMMY award for Outstanding Musical Direction for a televised musical event. Other nominees included The Olympic Games-Opening Ceremonies (which won the EMMY), In Concert at the White House, The Kennedy Center Honours, and Andrea Bocelli and David Foster in concert.
