= Manhattan Records =

American record label

- Parent company: Universal Music Group
- Founded: 1984; 42 years ago
- Founder: Bruce Lundvall
- Distributor: Interscope Capitol Labels Group
- Genre: Adult contemporary, classical (current); Various (historical)
- Country of origin: United States

Manhattan Records is an American record label, owned by Universal Music Group and operates as a branch of Interscope Capitol Labels Group.

== Company history ==
Manhattan Records was formed in 1984 by Bruce Lundvall and was later renamed EMI Manhattan Records after absorbing the EMI America Records imprint. EMI Manhattan was used to reissue back catalogue titles from Capitol Records and other EMI-owned labels such as United Artists Records and Liberty Records. It also distributed new albums from Gamble and Huff's Philadelphia International Records during the later half of the 1980s, after a 15-year stint with CBS Records. The deal gave EMI distribution rights to PIR's back catalog from 1976 onward (CBS, later Sony Music, would retain the rights to PIR's catalog up to 1975 and later acquire the rest in 2007).

An unrelated 1977 label also named Manhattan Records was founded. It was distributed by UA Records before its closure in 1980.

Artists signed to EMI Manhattan included Kenny Rogers, Richard Marx, Natalie Cole, Red Hot Chili Peppers, Queensrÿche, David Bowie, and Thomas Dolby. In 1989, EMI Manhattan was dissolved and absorbed into Capitol Records to become EMI Records USA, with the catalog bearing the EMI label.

In 1985, Manhattan Records and Island Records entered into a joint venture to release the U.S. version of Grace Jones' album Slave to the Rhythm. The album used the Manhattan prefix number. In the UK the album was released by ZTT via Island Records with neither Manhattan nor Capitol nor EMI being part of the release.

From 1988 to 1992, albums by D'Atra Hicks, Phil Perry, Gary Brown, and Rachelle Ferrell were released under the Capitol Manhattan label. All releases in the U.S. used both the Capitol and Manhattan logos respectively. The vinyl versions (Brown and Ferrell were not released on LP) were still using the original Manhattan Records colored bricks graphics on the record even though the Capitol logo was added.

In 2001, the Manhattan label was relaunched (without the EMI prefix) as a division of EMI Classics by veteran record producer Arif Mardin. Richard Marx, one of its flagship artists during the label's heyday, returned to the label upon its revival. In 2006, EMI reorganized its adult music operations and put the Manhattan label under the aegis of the Blue Note Label Group. As of 2013, following the reorganization of labels as a result of Universal Music Group's acquisition of EMI, Manhattan currently operates under the umbrella of the Capitol Music Group.
