= The Fudge Family =

The Fudge Family may refer to two works by the Irish-born writer Thomas Moore.

- The Fudge Family in Paris (1818)
- The Fudge Family in England (1835)
