= Charles Edward Horn =

English composer and singer

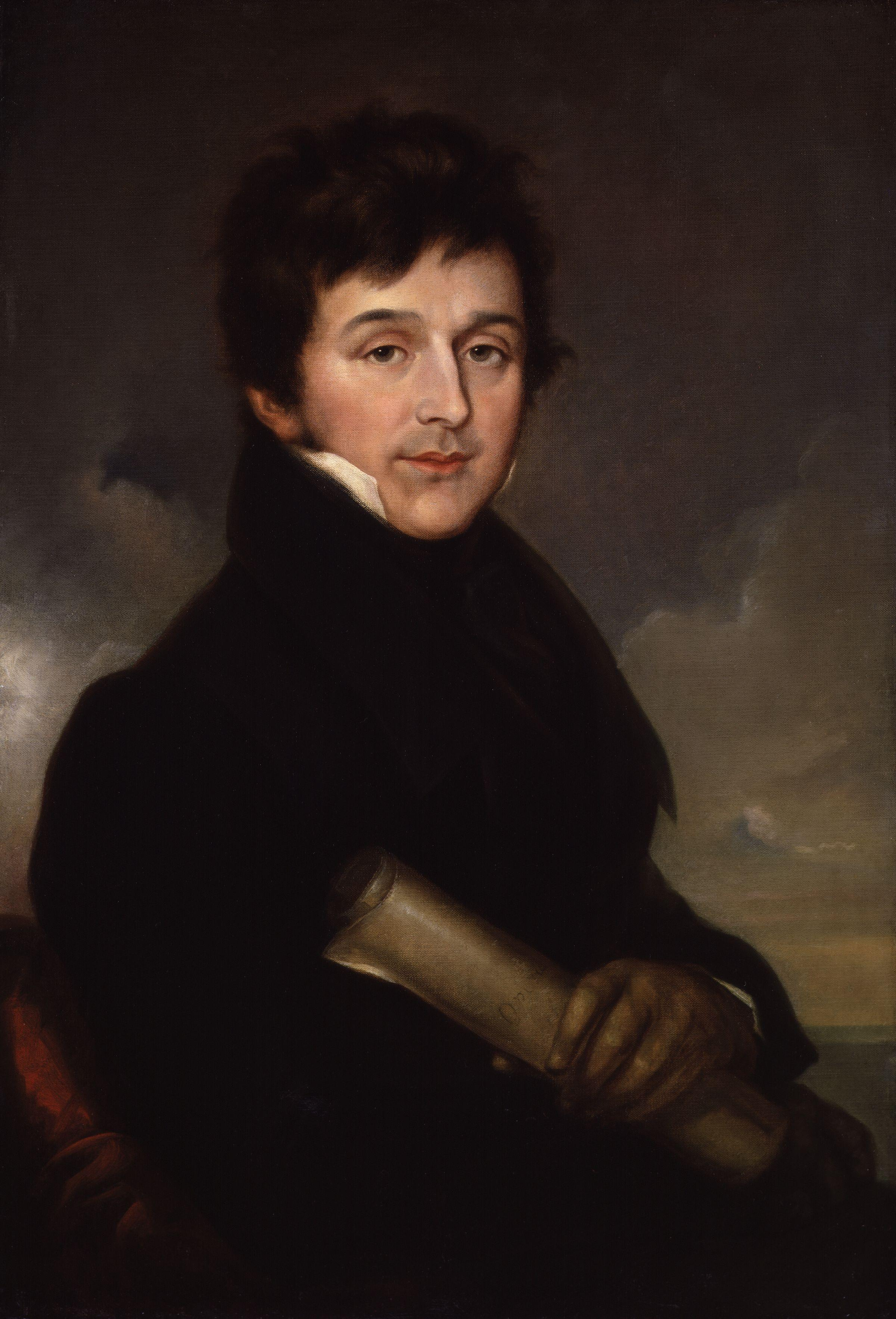
- Born: 21 June 1786; St Martin-in-the-Fields, London, England
- Died: 21 October 1849 (aged 63); Boston, Massachusetts, United States
- Era: Classical
- Works: M.P., or the Blue Stocking, The Devil's Bridge, Rich and Poor

Charles Edward Horn (21 June 1786 – 21 October 1849) was an English composer and singer.

== Life and career ==
Horn was born in St Martin-in-the-Fields, London, to Charles Frederick Horn and his wife, Diana Dupont. He was the eldest of their seven children. His father taught him music; he also took music lessons briefly in 1808 from singer Venanzio Rauzzini in Bath, Somerset. Horn made his singing debut on 26 June 1809 with a performance in the comic opera Up All Night, or the Smuggler's Cave (words by Samuel James Arnold and music by Matthew Peter King) at Lyceum Theatre, London. Horn continued singing, including a well-received turn in 1814 as Seraskier in Stephen Storace's The Siege of Belgrade. He achieved prominence with his portrayal of Caspar in the English version of Carl Maria von Weber's Der Freischütz in 1824.

Horn began composing music soon after his stage debut, writing glees and operas. He helped compose music for Thomas Moore's comic opera M.P., or the Blue Stocking (1811) and the successful 1812 opera The Devil's Bridge. He soon became a prolific composer for the stage; many of his songs for larger dramatic works became popular, including "On the banks of Allan Water" from Rich and Poor (1812), "I know a bank" from The Merry Wives of Windsor (1823), "The deep, deep sea" in Honest Frauds (1830), and "Cherry Ripe" from Paul Pry (1826). The latter became a subject of controversy after Thomas Attwood accused him of plagiarizing the song. Horn was acquitted in court, however; according to one account, he helped his case by personally singing his version and Attwood's version to the jury.

In 1827, Horn sailed to New York City, where he made a successful American debut. In addition to giving singing performances, he staged works by Storace, Weber, Wolfgang Amadeus Mozart, and Gioachino Rossini. He briefly returned to London for a few years, overseeing the debut of his Honest Frauds (1830) and serving as music director of the Olympic Theatre from 1831 to 1832, before sailing back to New York. There, he became the music director of Park Theatre, producing and directing performances of his own works and arrangements of works by others. His oratorio The Remission of Sin (1835) may be the first oratorio composed in the United States. After losing his voice due to illness in 1835, he started giving singing lessons. Two years later, he entered into a business partnership and opened a music store on Broadway. In 1842, he helped found the New York Philharmonic Society.

After visiting England for a few years in the 1840s, he returned to the United States in 1847, settling in Boston. There, he was elected director of the Handel and Haydn Society. Horn died in Boston. He married twice, first to Matilda Ray or Rae (c. 1790–1842) and in 1838 to Maria Horton (d. 1887) and had one son, Charles, who became a tenor.
