= Jenkinstown Castle =

Historic house in County Kilkenny

Coordinates: 52.7298°N 7.2899°W

- Interactive map of the Jenkinstown Castle area

General information
- Location: Jenkinstown Park, County Kilkenny, Ireland

Jenkinstown Castle was a country house using designs by William Robertson which incorporated the earlier Palladian building (pre-1798). This structure was built for Sir Patrick Bellew (1798–1866), first Baron Bellew of Barmeath at Jenkinstown Park, County Kilkenny, Ireland. However the design had serious structural issues, and the Bellews hired architect Charles Frederick Anderson to remedy the situation. However, some of that structure collapsed. The architect left Ireland and moved to the USA. The house was restored in a smaller version and remained occupied by the Bellew family until the 1930s.

Once the family left the house, most of it fell into extreme disrepair. The chapel was used by the parish of Conahy. Some of the house was demolished. Today the castle is a manor house and was restored using material from the original building between 2013 and 2014. The chapel was converted into an auditorium.

== Visitors ==
Thomas Moore was a guest staying in the house and wrote The Last Rose of Summer there in 1805.
