= The Life and Death of Lord Edward Fitzgerald =

1831 biography by Thomas Moore

- Author: Thomas Moore
- Language: English
- Genre: Biography
- Publisher: Longmans
- Publication date: 1831
- Publication place: United Kingdom
- Media type: Print

The Life and Death of Lord Edward Fitzgerald is an 1831 biography written by the Irish author Thomas Moore. It depicts the life the eighteenth century Irish aristocrat and soldier Lord Edward Fitzgerald. Fitzgerald had served in the British Army in the American War of Independence but later became a prominent member of the United Irishmen, and died of wounds sustained when he resisted arrest in 1798. Thomas Moore was a noted Romantic writer and a friend of Lord Byron. He wrote the book at his long-term home Sloperton Cottage in Wiltshire. The book was published in two volumes in London by Longmans. It was a key work in establishing Fitzgerald as an Irish nationalist icon. It featured a frontispiece based on the Portrait of Lord Edward Fitzgerald by Hugh Douglas Hamilton.

It formed part of a wider shift that transformed Fitzgerald from a political and military strategist into a romanticised tragic innocent. Moore added a preface to the work suggesting he was reluctant to release the book in the wake of the recent uprisings across Europe triggered by the July Revolution in France in case his historical account was considered a call for revolution in the present. It was one of several biographies he published including his Memoirs of the Life of Richard Brinsley Sheridan (1825) and Life of Lord Byron 1830.

== Bibliography ==
- Kelly, Ronan. Bard of Erin: The Life of Thomas Moore. Penguin Books, 2009.
- Morrison, Robert (ed.) The Oxford Handbook of British Romantic Prose. Oxford University Press, 20024.
- Smyth, Jim. Revolution, Counter-Revolution and Union: Ireland in the 1790s.
