= Irish Melodies =

Series of songbooks by Irish poet and lyricist Tomas Moore

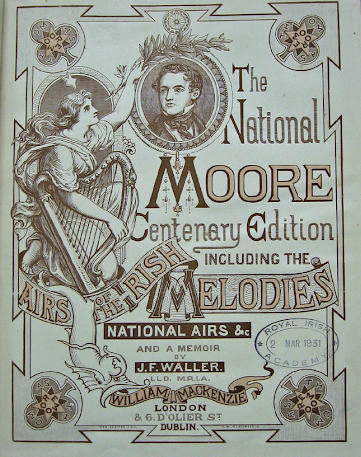
Moore Centenary Edition (1880), including Irish Melodies

Irish Melodies was the most popular and internationally acclaimed work of Irish writer, poet, and lyricist Thomas Moore (1779–1852). Appearing in a series of ten songbooks between 1808 and 1834, they set to traditional Irish tunes or airs English-language lyrics that spoke to a national history of dispossession, loss, and resistance. Together with his romantic poem Lalla Rookh (1817), which within an orientalist allegory explores similar themes, the Melodies secured Moore’s recognition as Ireland's "national bard" and as a leading exemplar of European Romanticism. There were numerous translations, and re-arrangements by continental composers.

== Origin and reception ==
Had he died early in his career, Moore might not have been considered an Irish poet. In London, he had collaborated briefly as a librettist with Michael Kelly in the comic opera,The Gypsy Prince, and had hazarded two collections of mildly erotic poems. The style and focus of Moore's writing changed dramatically when, in 1806, he took up the suggestion of his publisher James and William Power that he write lyrics to a series of Irish tunes in "direct emulation of George Thomson's collections of Scottish and Irish music". As a student at Trinity College, Dublin, Moore had been introduced to Edward Bunting's A General Collection of the Ancient Irish Music (1797), and with Sir John Andrew Stevenson as the musical arranger, he now worked to craft from these new sets of parlour songs.

The Melodies proved an immediate publishing success, with five volumes appearing between 1808 and 1813. "The Harp that did once through Tara's Hall", "The Minstrel Boy" and "The Last Rose of Summer" (which in the United States alone sold more than a million copies) became immensely popular.

Encouraged, Moore and his publisher thought to employ the same formula with melodies variously described as Indian, Spanish, Portuguese, Sicilian, Venetian, Scotch, Italian and Hungarian. Beginning in 1818, Moore's National Airs appeared in six volumes with Stevenson again responsible for the musical arrangement. Already in 1826, a German publisher had produced a complete volume of Moore's works (albeit with the "great lyric talents" of the bard advertised as "the pride of the English nation"). There were parodies in England, but translations into German, Italian, Hungarian, Czech, and French, and new musical arrangements by, among others, Ludwig van Beethoven and Hector Berlioz, guaranteed a large European audience.

Moore's friend, the poet Lord Byron, claimed to know the Melodies all "by rote and by heart", and to set Moore above all other poets for his "peculiarity of talent, or rather talents, – poetry, music, voice, all his own". They were also praised by Sir Walter Scott who conceded that neither he nor Byron could attain Moore's power of adapting words to music.

Moore was in no doubt that the Irish Melodies would be the only work of his pen "whose fame (thanks to the sweet music in which it is embalmed) may boast a chance of prolonging its existence to a day much beyond our own". They distinguished him in his lifetime, as his country's national poet, a popular honour he sought to maintain by declining an offer from Dublin Castle to become Ireland's first poet laureate. He believed the salaried position would have compromised his ability to contribute to a distinctly "national music".

== Ireland's "national music" ==
"The Last Rose of Summer"
sung by Adelina Patti in 1906

In Britain, conservative critics discerned something more than innocent parlour compositions. The "ultra-Tory" Anti-Jacobin Review characterised the songs as the "ravings of the disappointed rebel", "composed in a very disordered state of society". Yet, by the publication of the third volume of the Melodies in 1810, there were indications that Moore had "considerably softened his tone". Moore dedicated the new volume to the Marchioness Dowager of Donegall, and prefaced it with a letter describing his target audience:

there is no one who deprecates more sincerely than I do any appeal to the passions of an ignorant and angry multitude; but that it is not through that gross and inflammable region of society, a work of this nature could ever have been intended to circulate. It looks much higher for its audience and readers—it is found upon the piano-fortes of the rich and the educated—of those who can afford to have their national zeal a little stimulated, without exciting much dread of the excesses into which it may hurry them.

In pandering to the English drawing room, the English essayist and critic William Hazlitt proposed that Moore was converting "the wild harp of Erin into a musical snuff box".

Moore remained wary of popular mobilisation. In the wake of Catholic emancipation, for which he had campaigned, Moore suggested (privately) that the hero of the hour, Daniel O'Connell, had brought "tarnish upon Irish patriotism" with "his ragamuffins". Regardless, O'Connell invoked Moore's Melodies in his new campaign for repeal of the Acts of Union and the restoration of an Irish parliament. The Repeal Association's outdoor "monster meetings" were usually followed by public banquets. Famously, at Mallow, County Cork, before the dinner speeches, a singer performed Moore's "Where Is the Slave?": "Oh, where's the slave so lowly, Condemned to chains unholy, Who could be burst His bonds accursed, Would die beneath them slowly?" O'Connell leapt to his feet, threw his arms wide and cried "I am not that slave!" All the room followed: "We are not those slaves! We are not those slaves!" In the greatest meeting of all, at the Hill of Tara (by tradition the inaugural seat of the High Kings of Ireland), on the feast-day of the Assumption August 1843, O'Connell's carriage proceeded through a crowd, reported as a million strong, accompanied by a harpist playing Moore's "The Harp that once through Tara's Halls".

The Young Irelanders, who, for their own reasons, distanced themselves from O'Connell, found Moore's lyrical effusions less convincing. By the early 1840s, Thomas Davis conceded that the Melodies were "no longer as they were, popular only in the drawing rooms of Europe and America; they were gradually becoming known to the middle classes in Ireland, and the Irish translation [by John McHale, published in 1842 by John Cumming] bids fair to reach the mind of our peasantry". But in what he described as the "whining lamentation over our eternal fall, and miserable appeals to our masters to regard us with pity", Davis detected a tone of national resignation and defeatism. In the pages of The Nation, he and Charles Gavan Duffy sought to advance a national poetry with a "more vehement diction".

In editing The Ballad Poetry of Ireland (1845), Duffy advanced other claimants to the title of Ireland's national poet: John Banim, James Clarence Mangan and Samuel Ferguson.

== Later criticism and reappraisal ==
Dear Harp of My Country

Dear Harp of my Country! in darkness I found thee,
The cold chain of Silence had hung o'er thee long.
When proudly, my own Island Harp, I unbound thee,
And gave all thy chords to light, freedom, and song.
The warm lay of love and the light note of gladness
Have waken'd thy fondest, thy livliest thrill,
But, so oft hast thou echoed the deep sigh of sadness,
That even in thy mirth it will steal from thee still.

Dear Harp of my country! farewell to thy numbers,
This sweet wreath of song is the last we shall twine!
Go, sleep with the sunshine of Fame on thy slumbers,
Till touch'd by some hand less unworthy than mine.
If the pulse of the patriot, soldier, or lover,
Have throbb'd at our lay, 'tis thy glory alone;
I was but as the wind, passing heedlessly over,
And all the wild sweetness I waked was thy own.

— From the Moore's Irish Melodies, Volume 4, 1811

A later generation of Irish writers, shared Davis's reservations. In A Portrait of the Artist as a Young Man, as he passes "the droll statue of the national poet of Ireland" in College Street, James Joyce's biographic protagonist, Stephen Dedalus, remarks on the figure's "servile head". At the same time, Dedalus is moved when at his father's house he hears his younger brothers and sisters singing Moore's "Oft in the Stilly Night". Despite Joyce's occasional expressions of disdain for the bard, critic Emer Nolan suggests that the writer responded to the "element of utopian longing as well as the sentimental nostalgia" in Moore's music. In Finnegans Wake, Joyce has occasion to allude to virtually every one of the Melodies.

While acknowledging that his own sense of an Irish past was "woven . . . out of Moore's Melodies", in a 1979 tribute to Moore, Seamus Heaney remarked that Ireland had rescinded Moore's title of national bard because his characteristic tone was "too light, too conciliatory, too colonisé" for a nation "whose conscience was being forged by James Joyce, whose tragic disunity was being envisaged by W.B. Yeats and whose literary tradition was being restored by the repossession of voices such as Aodhagán O Rathaille's or Brian Merriman's".

Recently, there has been a reappraisal more sympathetic "strategies of disguise, concealment and historical displacement so necessary for an Irish Catholic patriot who regularly sang songs to London glitterati about Irish suffering and English 'bigotry and misrule'". The political content of the Melodies and their connections to the United Irishmen and to the death of Robert Emmet have been discussed in Ronan Kelly's biography of the poet, Bard of Erin (2008), by Mary Helen Thuente in The Harp Restrung: the United Irishmen and the Rise of Literary Nationalism (1994); and by Una Hunt in Literary Relationship of Lord Byron and Thomas Moore (2001).

Eóin MacWhite and Kathleen O'Donnell have found that the political undertone of the Melodies and of other of Moore's works was readily appreciated by dissidents in the imperial realms of eastern Europe. Greek-Rumanian conspirators against the Sultan, Russian Decembrists and, above all, Polish intellectuals, recognised in the Gothic elements of the Melodies, as well as of Lalla Rookh ("a dramatization of Irish patriotism in an Eastern parable"), "a cloak of culture and fraternity".

== Arrangements and recordings in the 20th century ==
Songs from the Melodies persisted through the first half of twentieth as performance classics. "The Harp That Once Through Tara's Halls", "The Minstrel Boy", "Believe Me, If All Those Endearing Young Charms", and "The Last Rose of Summer" were staples in the repertoire of the Irish lyric tenor and recording artist John McCormack.

In 1960, the english composer Benjamin Britten arranged a selection of Moore Melodies sung and recorded by Peter Pears. That same year, Joni James and Joan Baez recorded their own versions of "Believe Me, If All Those Endearing Young Charms". In 1995, Hyperion Records released Thomas Moore's Irish Melodies, including the extensive My Gentle Harp collection, featuring their original settings. In 1999, the producer, singer and scholar James W. Flannery published Dear Harp of My Country: The Irish Melodies of Thomas Moore. The work revisits "the story of Ireland's first national poet" and reprints a selection of the Melodies again in "their spare, original settings" with a harp accompaniment.
