= Rosa 'Old Blush' =

Rose cultivar

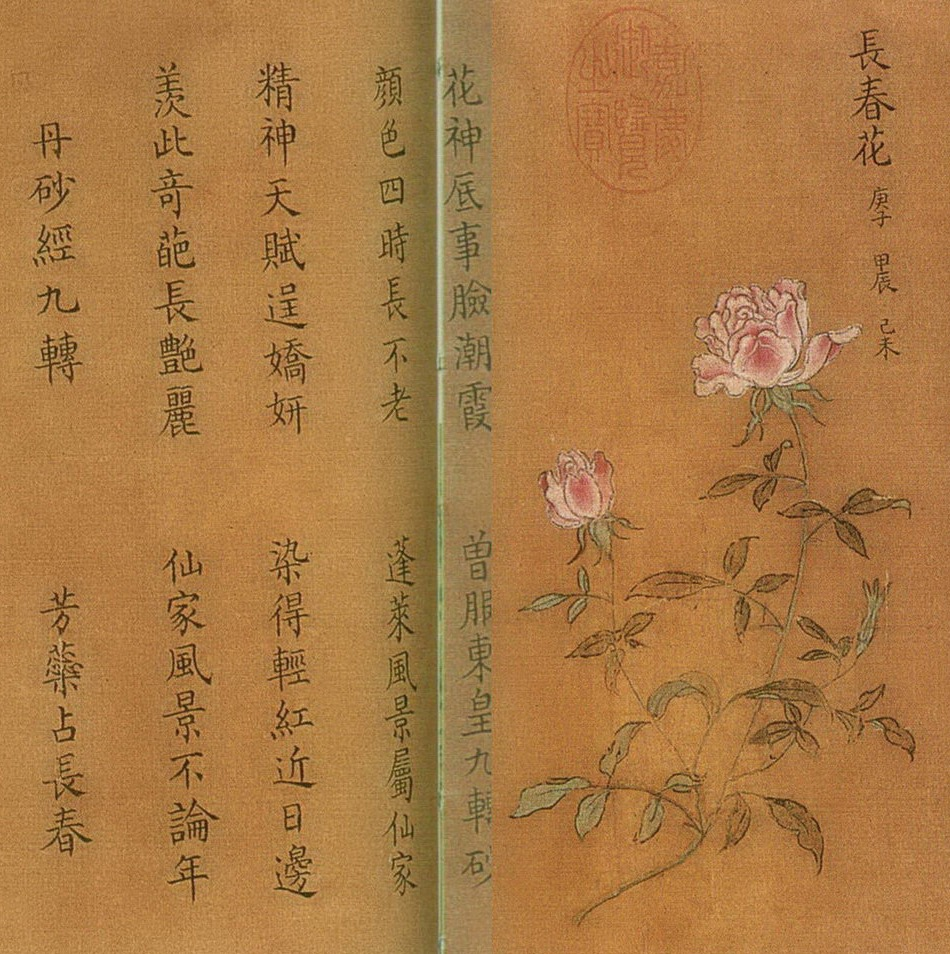
- A 13th-century Chinese painting depicting Rosa 'Old Blush'
- Hybrid parentage: Rosa chinensis
- Cultivar group: China
- Cultivar: Rosa 'Old Blush'
- Marketing names: 'Parson's Pink China', 'Common Monthly', 'Monthly Rose', 'Old Blush China', 'Old China Monthly', 'Pallida', 'Rosier du Bengale Rose'
- Origin: East Asia, in Europe since about 1750

Rosa 'Old Blush', also known as 'Parsons' Pink China', 'Old Blush China', 'Old China Monthly', is a China rose (known in Chinese as yue yue fen "monthly pink") and has been cultivated in China for about a thousand years. It derives from Rosa chinensis, and is generally accepted as the first East Asian rose cultivar to reach Europe. It is recorded in Sweden in 1752 and in England before 1759, but was probably cultivated in China for several centuries. It is believed to be the rose which inspired the song The Last Rose of Summer by the Irish composer and poet Thomas Moore. It is also known as Parsons' Pink China, named after Mr Parson who introduced it commercially to the UK in 1793.

== Description ==
'Old Blush' has light silvery pink semi-double flowers of medium size that darken as they age. They bloom in fives and have a light to strong tea fragrance, a cupped to flat bloom form, and an average diameter of 7 centimetres (2.8 in). The red buds appear in clusters almost continuously from early June to the first frost - in warmer regions even throughout the year, and can develop to small, red rose hips.

The shrub has an arching form, few prickles and mid-green leaves that have a crimson colour when young. It grows 100 to 150 centimetres (3.3 to 4.9 ft) tall and about 90 to 120 centimetres (3.0 to 3.9 ft) wide, tolerates half shade, poor soils, and is winter hardy down to -18 °C (USDA zone 6 to 7). The cultivar can be trained as a small climber, reaching up to 2.5 metres (8.2 ft) height which has larger flowers.

== Awards ==
The cultivar was one of the four cultivars inducted into the Old Rose Hall of Fame by the World Federation of Rose Societies at its creation in 1988.

== Offspring ==
'Old Blush', together with 'Slater's Crimson China' and the tea roses 'Hume's Blush Tea-scented China' and 'Parks' Yellow Tea-scented China', introduced to European gardens roses which would bloom repeatedly from spring to fall, whereas the Old European roses tend to bloom only once, on the previous year's wood. The chinas and teas became the foundation of numerous new classes of roses, including the bourbons, noisettes, hybrid perpetuals, and thence the modern garden roses.

'Old Blush' itself was parent to two of these classes: a natural cross of 'Old Blush' with 'Autumn Damask' on the Ile de Bourbon gave rise to 'Rose Edouard', the first bourbon rose; and John Champneys' hybrid of 'Old Blush' with the musk rose was 'Champneys' Pink Cluster', the first noisette and parent of the better known 'Blush Noisette'.

Two well-known sports of 'Old Blush' are 'Climbing Old Blush' (known since about 1750), one of the best climbers with slightly larger flowers than its parent, and 'Viridiflora', a green cultivar, that was introduced by Bambridge & Harrison in 1845.
