= Matthew Peter King =

(1773–1823) English composer

Matthew Peter King (c.1773 – January 1823) was an English composer, mainly of light operas.

== Life ==
Little is known of his life. King was born in London about 1773, and studied musical composition under Charles Frederick Horn. He lived mainly in London, where he died in January 1823.

== Compositions ==
King wrote the music to a number of dramatic pieces, most of which were produced at the Lyceum Theatre, London. These include:

- Matrimony, comic opera, words by James Kenney, 1804
- The Invisible Girl, and The Weathercock, 1806
- False Alarms, comic opera, music by King and John Braham, words by J. Kenney, 1807
- One O'clock, or The Wood Demon, comic opera, music by King and Kenney, words by M. G. Lewis, 1807
- Ella Rosenberg, melodrama, by J. Kenney, 1807
- Up all Night, or The Smugglers' Cave, comic opera, words by S. J. Arnold, 1809
- Plots, or The North Tower, melodramatic opera, words by S. J. Arnold, 1810
- Oh! this Love, comic opera, words by J. Kenney, 1810
- The Americans, music by King and Braham, 1811
- Timour the Tartar, romantic melodrama, by M. G. Lewis, 1811
- Turn him out, musical farce, words by J. Kenney, 1812
- The Fisherman's Hut, music by King and Davy, 1819

King composed a number of glees, ballads, and piano pieces, as well as an oratorio, The Intercession, which was produced at Covent Garden in 1817. From this, Eve's lamentation, "Must I leave thee, Paradise?" became very popular.

== Literature ==
He was the author of:

- Thorough Bass made easy to every Capacity (1796)
- A General Treatise on Music, particularly on Harmony or Thorough Bass (1800; new edition 1809)
- Introduction to the Theory and Practice of Singing at First Sight (1806)
- He edited The Harmonist, a Collection of Glees and Madrigals from the Classic Poets (1814)

His son, C. M. King, published some songs in 1826.
