= Memoirs of Captain Rock =

1824 novel

- Author: Thomas Moore
- Language: English
- Genre: Satirical novel
- Publisher: Longmans
- Publication date: 1824
- Publication place: United Kingdom
- Media type: Print

Memoirs of Captain Rock is an 1824 satirical novel by the Irish writer Thomas Moore. It was first published in London by Longmans. The novel fictionalizes the mythical agrarian leader Captain Rock, a figure associated with agrarian unrest and clandestine rural protest in early nineteenth-century Ireland, similar to Captain Swing in England. Moore composed the work following his 1823 journey through Ireland with his Anglo-Irish patron, the Marquess of Lansdowne, who owned large estates in the West of Ireland. During which he directly observed rural poverty and social unrest. The narrative is framed as a multigenerational family memoir recounted to an outsider, Allowing the novel to interpret agrarian resistance through satire and political commentary.

Moore had long been a resident in England, and was a noted figure in Regency society in Whig circles. He retained an interest in Irish affairs and supported the Catholic Committee which sought to abolish the penal laws. Moore had initially intended travel in the company of his friend Lord John Russell, the future Prime Minister, who had to pull out at the last moment. Moore witnessed the poverty of parts of rural Ireland which, as a Dubliner, he had previously been largely sheltered from, and was intrigued by stories he heard of the mythical Captain Rock who led the rural insurgency. On returning to his Wiltshire home near Bowood, he wrote the piece as a diversion from his work on his biography of Richard Brinsley Sheridan.

== Background and composition ==
On returning to his home near Bowood House in Wiltshire, Moore wrote the work as a political and literary diversion whilst he engaged in writing his biography of Richard Brinsley Sheridan. The novel is the fictional form of multigenerational memoir to present the history of the Rockite movement through the voice of a peasant family. This frames contemporary political unrest through a satirical narrative.

== Plot ==
Memoirs of Captain Rock is presented as a frame narrative in which an English narrator, traveling to Ireland as part of a religious mission, encounters a mysterious figure who reveals himself as Captain Rock. The narrator is given a manuscript purporting to be the memoirs of Captain Rock and his ancestors and is urged to read it before continuing his mission. The memoirs include the history of the Rock family across several centuries of Irish history, using this historical anecdote as a means to blend satire and pollical commentary. Through successive generations, members of the Rock lineage are as recurring figures in rebellion, reflecting tensions between the Irish rural population and English authority. The narrator moves episodically through major historical periods, exaggerating incidents and ironically commenting on systems of government and religious policy.

After reading the manuscript, the narrator abandons his original mission intentions, concluding that grievances described within reflect systemic injustice rather than moral failure among the Irish population.

== Historical context ==
The novel is set during the agrarian disturbances associated with the Rockite movement, which spread across southern Ireland in the early 1820s. The Rockites were part of a clandestine rural protest tradition that was in response to rising rents and evictions. As well as food shortages and the compulsory payment of tithes to support the Church of Ireland. Although largely Catholic tenant farmers bore the economic burden of the tithe system, the proceeds were directed to the Anglican establishment. This produced widespread resentment and organized resistance.

Rockite groups carried out nocturnal raids where they would destroy property. Threats against landlords and tithe proctors were signed under the name "Captain Rock." While British authorities and many contemporary commentators characterized the movement as criminal, modern historians have emphasized its political and ideological dimensions. Rockite demands frequently included rent reduction, opposition to tithes, and resistance to perceived English domination of Irish society.

The period of most intense Rockite activity, between 1821 and 1824, coincided directly with the composition and publication of Memoirs of Captain Rock. Moore’s novel uses this climate of political unrest to transform the real-world figure of Captain Rock into a literary and symbolic presence. By adopting the form of a multigenerational family memoir addressed to an outsider, the novel reflects contemporary debates over land, religion, and political authority in Ireland during the post-Napoleonic economic depression.

== Genre and themes ==
Memoirs of Captain Rock is commonly classified as a work of political prose satire. Rather than adopting the conventions of the gothic or romantic historical novel, which were popular in the early nineteenth century, Moore employed the structure of a fictional memoir to offer political argument regarding agrarian violence and Irish resistance. Literary scholar Fergus Dunne suggests the novel represents one of Moore’s most explicit engagements with radical political discourse in prose fiction.

The central theme of the novel’s political framework is its treatment of agrarian insurgency due to systemic oppression rather than criminal deviance. The figure of Captain Rock is not presented as a violent outlaw, but as a symbolic personification of rural resistance. Dunne argues that Moore’s narrative strategy frames peasant violence within a moral and political critique of tithe enforcement and Protestant Ascendancy power in Ireland.

The novel also discusses themes of translation and political interpretation through its framing device. By presenting the Rockite tradition as a family memoir recounted to an outsider, Moore questions audience and credibility. This narrative distancing allows the novel to operate as satire, political argument, and cultural commentary on Irish identity during the post-Union period.

== Bibliography ==
- Kelly, Ronan. Bard of Erin: The Life of Thomas Moore. Penguin Books, 2009.
- Swift, Roger & Gilley, Sheridan (ed.) The Irish in Britain, 1815-1939. Rowman & Littlefield, 1989.
