= The Last Rose of Summer =

Poem by the Irish poet Thomas Moore

The last rose of summer
sung by Adelina Patti in 1906

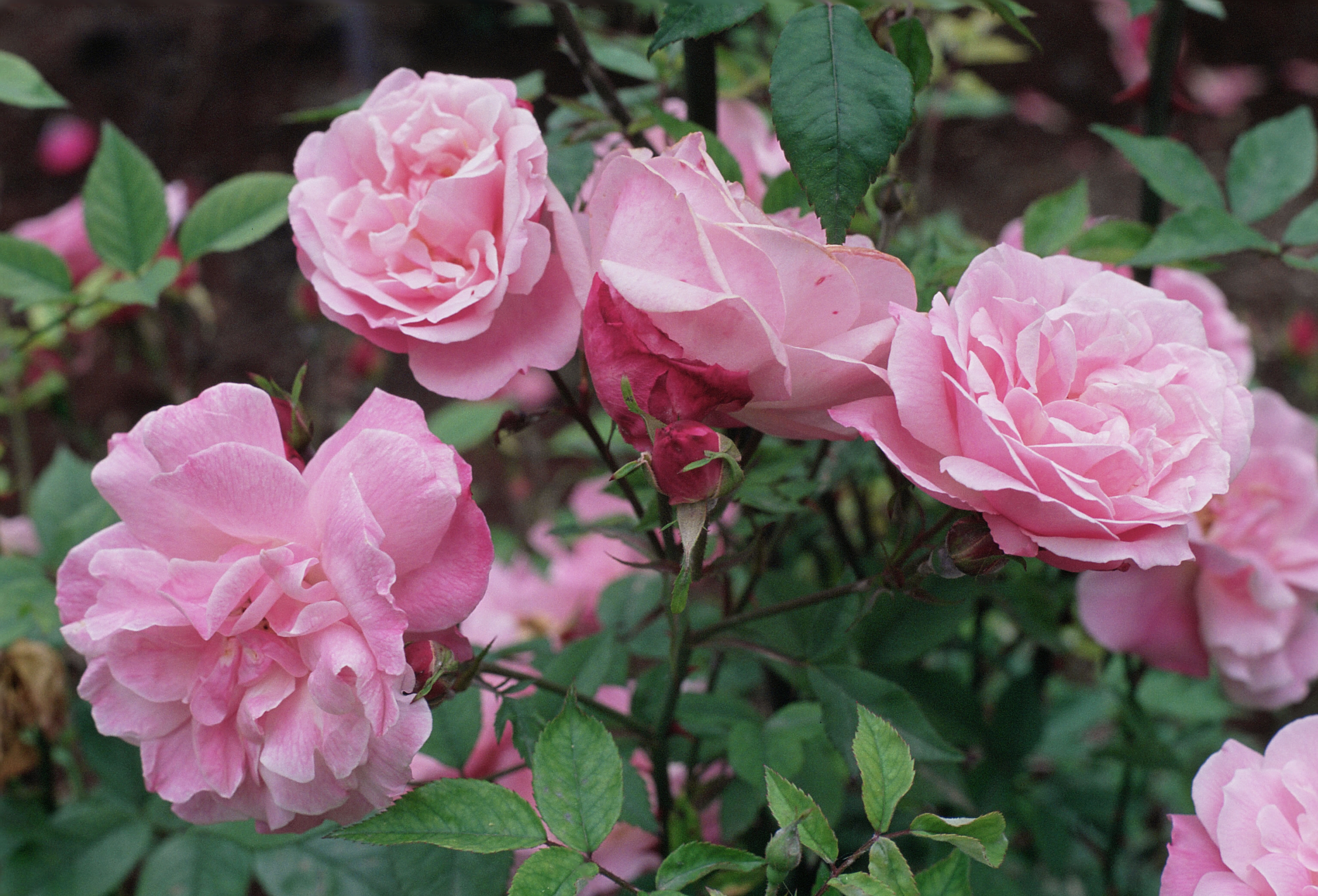
Rosa 'Old Blush'

"The Last Rose of Summer" is a poem by the Irish poet Thomas Moore. He wrote it in 1805, while staying at Jenkinstown Castle in County Kilkenny, Ireland, where he was said to have been inspired by a specimen of Rosa 'Old Blush'.

The poem is set to a traditional tune called "Aisling an Óigfhear", or "The Young Man's Dream", which was transcribed by Edward Bunting in 1792, based on a performance by harper Denis Hempson (Donnchadh Ó hAmhsaigh) at the Belfast Harp Festival. The poem and the tune together were published in December 1813 in volume 5 of Thomas Moore's A Selection of Irish Melodies. The original piano accompaniment was written by John Andrew Stevenson, several other arrangements followed in the 19th and 20th centuries. The poem is now probably at least as well known in its song form as in the original.

== Poem ==
Sheet music of The Last Rose of Summer

'Tis the last rose of summer,
Left blooming alone;
All her lovely companions
Are faded and gone;
No flower of her kindred,
No rose-bud is nigh,
To reflect back her blushes
Or give sigh for sigh!

I'll not leave thee, thou lone one.
To pine on the stem;
Since the lovely are sleeping,
Go, sleep thou with them;
Thus kindly I scatter
Thy leaves o'er the bed,
Where thy mates of the garden
Lie scentless and dead.

So soon may I follow,
When friendships decay,
And from love's shining circle
The gems drop away!
When true hearts lie withered,
And fond ones are flown,
Oh! who would inhabit
This bleak world alone?

== Musical settings ==
=== Classical ===
The following is an incomplete selection of "theme and variations" created during the 19th and 20th centuries.

- Ludwig van Beethoven used "The Last Rose of Summer" twice:
  - as no. 6 "Sad and Luckless was the Season" in volume 2 of his Irish Songs, WoO 153 (written 1814, published 1816)
  - as no. 4 of his Six National Airs with Variations, Op. 105 for flute and piano (composed 1818, published 1819)
- Ferdinand Ries: Grand sestetto ... in which is introduced the admired air 'The Last Rose Summer', Op. 100, for string quartet, double bass, piano (1819)
- Friedrich Kalkbrenner: Eighth Fantasia for the piano forte in which is introduced a favourite Irish melody, Op. 50, for piano (1821)
- Charles Bochsa: Fantaisie et variations sur un air favori irlandais, for harp (1822)
- Mauro Giuliani: No. 2 of Six Airs irlandois nationales variés, Op. 125, for guitar (c.1825)
- Ignaz Moscheles: The Recollections of Ireland, Op. 69, for piano and orchestra (1826)
- Felix Mendelssohn: Fantasia on 'The Last Rose of Summer', Op. 15, for piano (c.1827)
- Jean-Louis Tulou: Souvenir anglais, Op. 51, for 2 flutes and piano (1828)
- Friedrich Kuhlau: Variations on an Irish Folksong, Op. 105, for flute and piano (1829)
- Kaspar Kummer: Des Sommers letzte Rose, no. 6 in: Transcriptionen über beliebte Themen, Op. 57, for 2 flutes (1829)
- Auguste Franchomme: Variations sur des thèmes russes et écossais, Op. 6 (1835)
- Henri Herz: The Last Rose of Summer, Op. 159, for piano (1842)
- William Vincent Wallace: The Last Rose of Summer (1846)
- Friedrich von Flotow: aria "Letzte Rose" in the opera Martha (1847)
- Charles Mayer: La Dernière rose. Fantaisie variée, for piano (mid-1840s)
- Mikhail Glinka: Theme ecossais varie based on the Irish tune 'The Last Rose of Summer', for piano (1847)
- Joachim Raff: The Last Rose of Summer. La Dernière rose. Impromptu, Op. 46, for piano (1849)
- August Neithardt: Des Sommers letzte Rose, Op. 141 no. 3, for mixed choir (1850)
- Brinley Richards: The Last Rose of Summer, Op. 45, for piano (1853)
- Charles Oberthür: Fantaisie brillante, on motives of Flotow's Martha, introducing the air 'The Last Rose of Summer', Op. 116, for harp (1854)
- Sigismond Thalberg: The Last Rose of Summer. Air irlandais varié, Op. 73, for piano (1857)
- Jean-Chrisostome Hess: La Dernière rose d'été. Rêverie, Op. 66, for piano (1860)
- Henri Vieuxtemps: No. 5 of Bouquet Américain, Op. 33 ("Dernière rose de l'été"), for violin and piano (1860)
- Heinrich Wilhelm Ernst: No. 6 of Sechs mehrstimmige Etüden (Six Polyphonic Studies): Variations on 'The Last Rose of Summer', for violin solo (1865)
- Joseph O'Kelly: La Dernière rose; no. 6 of Les Soirées enfantines, 2nd series, versions for piano solo and 4-hands (1866)
- Jules Danbé: La Dernière rose. Mélodie irlandaise, fantaisie, for violin and piano (1870)
- Charles Gounod: The Last Rose of Summer, for mixed choir (1873)
- Dudley Buck: The Last Rose of Summer, Op. 59; introduction, theme, and variations for organ (1877)
- Sydney Smith: The Last Rose of Summer. Paraphrase de concert, Op. 173, for piano (c.1880)
- Félix Godefroid: La Dernière rose d'été. Mélodie irlandaise, for harp (1891)
- Max Reger: Vierstimmiger Kanon über das Lied 'Letzte Rose', for piano (1903)
- Paul Hindemith alluded to both words and music in his On Hearing 'The Last Rose of Summer', part of Nine English Songs (1944)
- Benjamin Britten: no. 9 of Folksong Arrangements, vol. 4: Moore's Irish Melodies (1958)
- Jörg Widmann: The Last Rose of Summer. A Farewell Song for viola and small orchestra (2023)

=== Popular ===
- In Japan, the melody is widely known as the song Niwa-no-Chigusa (庭の千草), meaning "The Plants in the Garden". The poem was adapted by Tadashi Satomi (1824–1886) and published as part of Primary School Songbooks (Volume III) in 1884 by the Japanese Education Ministry.
- Bing Crosby included the song in a medley on his album On the Sentimental Side (1962).
- Nina Simone covered it on her album Broadway-Blues-Ballads (1964).
- Mary O'Hara sang it, and accompanied herself on harp, on her album of the same name (1965).
- A Swedish language poem "Vid Roines strand" by Zacharias Topelius has several times been recorded with this tune, among others by Hootenanny Singers in 1966.
- Judas Priest recorded a song entitled "Last Rose of Summer" on their 1977 album Sin After Sin. Written by Rob Halford and Glenn Tipton, the song is all about "unyielding love".
- Clannad released a rendition of "The Last Rose of Summer" on their 1980 album Crann Úll.
- The poem is alluded to in the Grateful Dead song "Black Muddy River", which is sung to the original tune, on their 1987 album In the Dark.
- Sarah Brightman recorded "The Last Rose of Summer" for her 1988 album The Trees They Grow So High.
- Tom Waits included a song entitled "The Last Rose of Summer" on his 1993 album The Black Rider, based on the eponymous stage production by Waits, Robert Wilson (director) and William S. Burroughs. In it, the singer talks about the petals of his "favourite rose" being shrouded "in shadows dark and long". The song ends with the lines: "I can be found in the garden singing this song / When the last rose of summer is gone".
- Charlotte Church recorded "The Last Rose of Summer" on her 1999 album Charlotte Church.
- The Irish Tenors covered the song on their 2000 CD/DVD release Live in Belfast.
- It is sung in the musical group Celtic Woman by Méav Ní Mhaolchatha and Hayley Westenra. Chloë Agnew's solo version is recorded on her 2002 album Chloë. Ní Mhaolchatha's solo version is included in her 2006 A Celtic Journey album. In the 2007 Celtic Woman: A New Journey tours, Agnew sang duets with Ní Mhaolchatha, Westenra, and the vocalist-guitarist of the same group, Lynn Hilary.
- James Galway: Over the Sea to Skye – The Celtic Connection, James Galway & The Chieftains (2009).
- In 2010, Fionnuala Sherry of the New Instrumental duo Secret Garden released a version of the song titled "The Last Rose" on her solo debut album Songs From Before.
- Laura Wright recorded a version, featured on her album The Last Rose (2011).
- Kanye West refers to the poem in his song Blood on the Leaves on his album Yeezus wherein the rapper writes, "That summer night holdin' long and long, 'din long Now waiting for the summer rose and (breathe)" (2013).
- Anna Meredith recorded a version as "Last Rose" featured on her album "Varmints" (2016).
- Gintaras Januševičius uses the melody (with its Irish title "Aislean an Oigfear") as the opening of his 2019 narrative recital programme "The New Colossus". The programme is dedicated to people who built New York and their stories. The melody is included as a tribute to Irish people. Januševičius then uses attacca to go into the next piece – "L'isle Joyeuse" by Claude Debussy.

== Literary allusions ==
This poem is mentioned in Jules Verne's 1884 novel The Vanished Diamond (aka. The Southern Star), and by Wilkie Collins in The Moonstone (1868), in which Sergeant Cuff whistles the tune frequently.

The song is mentioned by James Joyce in Ulysses. It is also referred to, disdainfully, in George Eliot's Middlemarch.

The song also mentioned in Rupert Hughes's 1914 book by the same name, The Last Rose of Summer, and by Betty Smith in her 1943 novel A Tree Grows in Brooklyn.

== Film, television, radio, media and games ==
An American silent film titled The Last Rose of Summer was produced and released by the Lubin Manufacturing Company of Philadelphia in 1912.

A British silent film of The Last Rose of Summer made in 1920 stars Owen Nares and Daisy Burrell.

Deanna Durbin sings the song in the 1939 film, Three Smart Girls Grow Up.

In the 1941 film Here Comes Mr. Jordan, it is the character Joe Pendelton's inability to play "The Last Rose of Summer" on his saxophone in any way other than badly that allows him to prove that he is alive in another man's body; all the other characters think he is the dead man from whom he got the body, but when he plays the sax for his old boxing manager, he uses the same wrong note in the melody as he always did, and which thus confirms his story of coming back from the after-life.

In the 1944 film Gaslight, the melody is associated with the opera singer Alice Alquist, the murdered aunt of the protagonist, Paula (Ingrid Bergman).

In the 1951 film The Great Caruso, actor Mario Lanza who played Caruso sang it as Caruso's swan song.

In the 1953 I Love Lucy, episode "Never Do Business With Friends" (Season 2, Episode 31), Ethel Mertz (played by Vivian Vance) sings the first lines of this song while doing housework.

This song is heard played on a 19.5/8-inch upright Polyphon musical box as Katie Johnson is walking to/away from the police station at the start/end of the 1955 Alec Guinness film The Ladykillers.

The Last Rose of Summer was also the title (later revised as Dying of Paradise) of a three-hour science fiction production written by Stephen Gallagher in 1977–78 for Piccadilly Radio.

This song was also featured in the 1970 West Germany Film Heintje – Einmal wird die Sonne wieder scheinen.

In the 1983–1984 Japanese TV drama Oshin, broadcast on NHK, the melody is played on harmonica by the characters.

In the 1995 film An Awfully Big Adventure, the song is used as P.L. O'Hara's theme music and is a recurrent musical motif in the film's score.

The song was featured in Ric Burns' documentary series, New York: A Documentary Film (1999–2003), broadcast on PBS in the USA.

In the 2000 Thai western film Tears of the Black Tiger (Thai: ฟ้าทะลายโจร, or Fa Thalai Chon), a translated version of the song called "Kamsuanjan" ("The Moon Lament") was used as the closing song concurrent with the tragic ending of the film.

A cover of the song by organist Jesse Crawford is used in the track "We have been here before" in The Caretaker's 2003 album We'll all go riding on a rainbow, which the track is reused in "P1 A brutal bliss beyond this empty defeat" in Everywhere at the End of Time

The song was used in the 2008 video game Endless Ocean 2: Adventures of the Deep as the theme of the Depths area of the Zahhab Region. It is also playable on the jukebox that the player can purchase in-game.

In the 16th (final) episode of the 6th season (2009) of the UK Channel 4 television series Shameless, the song was sung by Jamie Maguire (played by Aaron McCusker) at the funeral of his sister Mandy Maguire (Samantha Siddall).

The song was featured in FOX TV series,"The Chicago Code" Season 1 Episode 2, "Hog Butcher" (February 2011). This traditional Irish song was sung by Jason Bayle, as the uniformed officer during the memorial service of fallen Chicago police officer Antonio Betz.

In Rooster Teeth Productions' RWBY web series, the name of Summer Rose is a direct reference to the poem. The thirteenth line, "Thus Kindly I Scatter", is used as the epitaph on her gravestone in the trailer "Red" and episodes one and twelve of the third season (2015).

In the Austenland (film) (2013), the character of Lady Amelia Heartwright plays a verse of the song while at the pianforte, in an affected and not particularly skilled manner.

In the Hangar 13 game Mafia III (2016), one of the main characters, Thomas Burke, can be heard singing this song with sorrow.

The 2017 film Three Billboards Outside Ebbing, Missouri starts with The Last Rose of Summer, performed by Renée Fleming from the CD The Beautiful Voice by Renée Fleming, the English Chamber Orchestra & Jeffrey Tate 1998. The song is played again late in the film, when the central character, Mildred Hayes, hurls Molotov cocktails at the police station. The version performed is part of the opera Martha by Friedrich von Flotow.

In the season 9 premiere of The Walking Dead, Hilltop resident Alden (played by Callan McAuliffe) sang a rendition of The Last Rose of Summer at the funeral of the blacksmith's son Ken.

Anya Taylor-Joy performs The Last Rose of Summer in another Austen-related film, the 2020 film adaptation of Emma, based on Jane Austen's 1815 novel of the same name.

A version of the song featured in the 2024 Chinese film Like a Rolling Stone, directed by Yin Lichuan. The translated lyrics are attributed to Deng Yingyi.

== Audio clips ==
- Aislean an oigfear
