= The Epicurean =

1827 novel by Thomas Moore

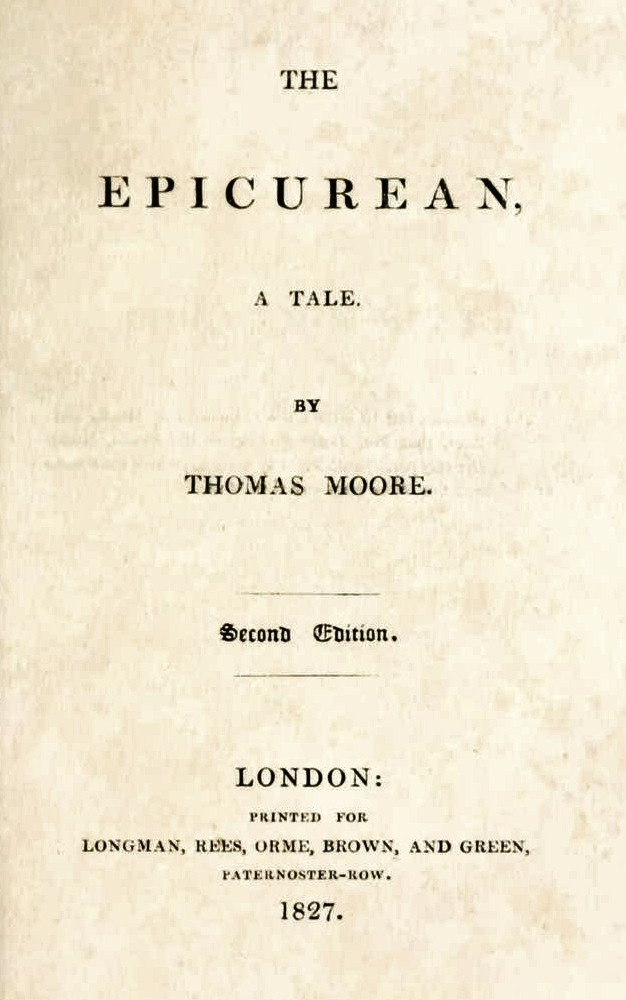
- Title page of the 1827 second edition
- Author: Thomas Moore
- Language: English
- Genre: Historical fantasy
- Set in: Egypt
- Publication date: 1827
- Media type: Print

The Epicurean is a novel by Thomas Moore, published in 1827. It relates the story of Alciphron, leader of the Epicurean sect in Athens in the 3rd century AD, who is on a journey to Egypt to find the secret to immortality. Some editions of the book include etchings by J. M. W. Turner.

The book purports to be a translation of an ancient, "curious Greek manuscript", found in the Monastery of Saint Macarius the Great in Egypt around 1800.

== Synopsis ==
The narrative begins with Alciphron's election to the leadership of the "school" or "sect" of Epicurus. He has a flash of insight indicating to him that "eternal life" awaits him in Egypt. Unsure of its meaning, he decides to pursue this premonition.

He travels there and undergoes various adventures, including initiation into the mysteries of the state religion, in pursuit of the beautiful priestess Alethe. She, a crypto-Christian, escapes the mystery rites with Alciphron, and they journey together along the Nile into Upper Egypt, heading for a Christian monastery, which is run by a follower of Origen.

Alciphron endures initiation into the Christian religion in hopes of remaining with Alethe. An imperial edict soon establishes the persecution of all Christians who will not renounce their faith, and Alciphron's companions, including Alethe, are captured and killed.
