= M.P. (opera) =

M. P., or The Blue Stocking, is an 1811 comic opera in three acts with a libretto by Thomas Moore and music written in collaboration between Moore and Charles Edward Horn (1786–1849). It was first staged at the Lyceum Theatre on 9 September 1811 under the directorship of Samuel James Arnold. The vocal score was published in London by J. Power (1811) and New York by The Longworths (1812).

The plot concerns a Member of Parliament, Sir Charles Canvas, who has cheated his elder brother, a naval officer, Captain Canvas, out of his inheritance. Canvas becomes mixed up with a bluestocking named Lady Bab Blue, and a series of mistaken identities follow.

Moore was dissatisfied with the work and reluctant about staging it at all. He refused to attend the first two performances before finally attending the third. He believed many of the references would be too highbrow for the audience. He tried to alter this by adding more populist additions, but he feared this would sacrifice the integrity of the work.

It was only the second work for the stage that Moore wrote after The Gypsy Prince, although he had performed in numerous amateur productions, and he decided it would be his last despite later tempting offers to write for the stage. Despite Moore's misgivings, the work received generally good reviews and had a respectable run of performances. It was later revived for productions in Bath and Dublin.
