= The Fudge Family in Paris =

Book by Thomas Moore

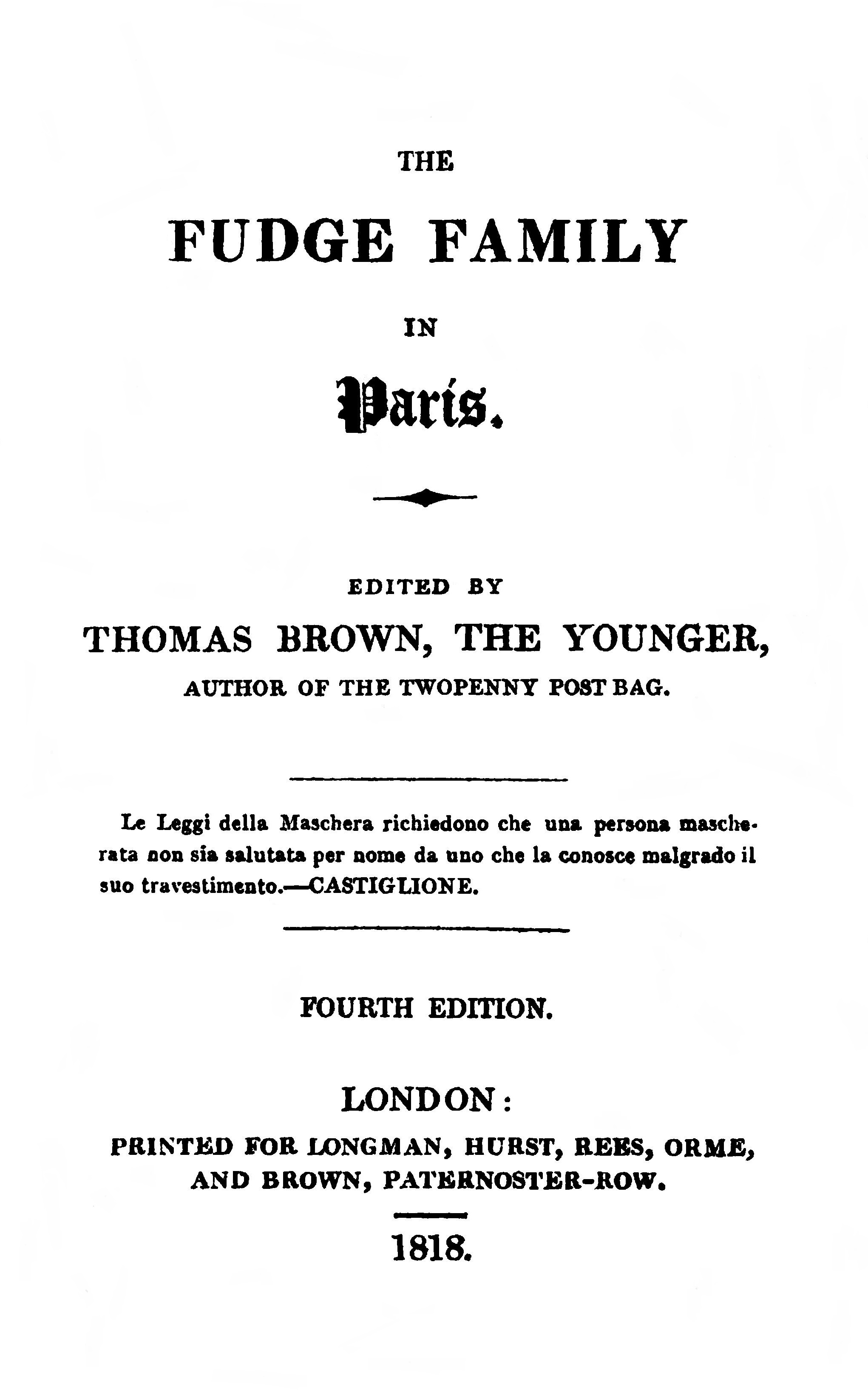
Title page to the 1818 fourth edition

The Fudge Family in Paris is an 1818 verse satire by Thomas Moore. It was intended to be a comedic critique of the post-war settlement of Europe following the Congress of Vienna and of the large number of British and Irish families who flocked to France for tourism. Written after a brief trip to Paris, its popular success inspired several more parodies and replies.

== The work ==
The Fudge Family in Paris was written following Thomas Moore's visit to Paris in company with Samuel Rogers in 1817. Such was its popularity after its appearance on 10 April 1818 from the Longman partnership that five editions were published in its first fortnight, with a further four editions that year as well as American editions from New York and Philadelphia. On its title page the work's editorship was attributed to Thomas Brown the Younger (alluding to the satirist of a century before), under which name Moore had published earlier epistolary political satires under the title of Intercepted Letters (1813). However, the true authorship of the Fudge correspondence was soon identified.

Ostensibly the work is a collection of letters that depict the visit to Paris of the Fudge family in the wake of the Bourbon Restoration. The party is made up of four characters who record their very different impressions. The father, Phil Fudge, is researching a book which he intends to be propaganda on behalf of his patron, Foreign Secretary Lord Castlereagh, whose parliamentary speeches he parrots. His son Bob is a dandy and glutton, while his daughter Biddy is in search of romance and falls in love with a commoner whom she believes to be royalty in disguise. Their tutor, Phelim Connor, on the other hand, is an Irish revolutionary and Bonapartist opposed to everything that his employer (and distant relative) stands for. Each character is further differentiated by the poetic form of their letters: Phelim declaims in decasyllables, Phil trips in lighter octosyllables, while Bob and Biddy chatter colloquially in anapaestic measure.

As well as a comic social satire, the poem is also an attack on Holy Alliance's reactionary and conservative actions, Tory policies regarding Ireland and Castlereagh's support for both. It was the political themes that William Hazlitt preferred in his contemporary review of The Fudge Family in Paris, soon collected in his Political Essays (1819), making of it an opportunity to bludgeon such Lake Poet turncoats as Southey, Wordsworth and Coleridge. Another critic allowed that the work was for its time "a happy blending of the political squib and the social burlesque", yet over the decades "it is the natural fate of ephemeral satire to perish with the events which gave rise to it".

Literary historians in the following century saw in Moore's poem a successful and influential imitation of Christopher Anstey's The New Bath Guide and in the line of the "anapaestic travel narratives" that Anstey had inspired. There has, however, been uncertainty over defining its literary genre. The work has been described as a "satirical travelogue", a "verse satire in epistolary form", and even as a precursor of the Victorian "verse novel".

== Imitations and sequels ==
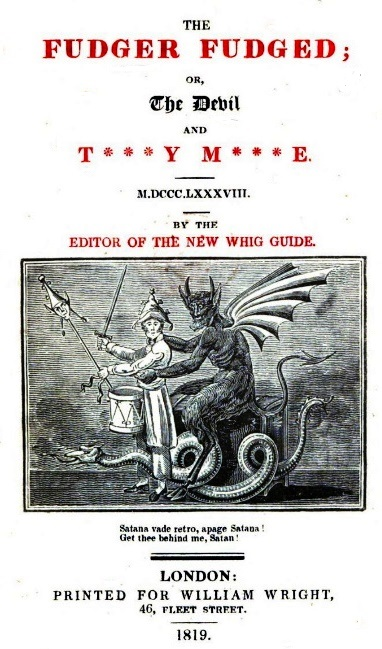
Moore as the Devil's puppet in the 1819 political reply to his satire

In the same year that The Fudge Family in Paris was launched, it was followed by the imitative Replies to the Letters of the Fudge Family in Paris, using the same epistolary form and anapaestic measure and pretending to be "edited by Thomas Brown Esq." Moore was quick to disavow the work that many were taking for his as a "catchpenny" derivative and "an impudent thing". It was not long, either, before Moore came under attack from the satirised Tory side in The Fudger Fudged (London 1819).

Moore's work was followed by several other imitations in the next few years. They included The Fudge Family in Edinburgh in a series of Poetical Epistles, ascribed to a pseudonymous Nehemiah Nettlebottom (Edinburgh 1820). This centred on the Caledonian tour of Bob Fudge and had a complicated plot recounted over 19 letters and involving seven characters. The contemporary The Fudge Family in Washington, supposed to have been "edited by Harry Nimrod" (Baltimore 1820), introduced a Fudge family relative from Virginia on a trip to the American capital. This included both political satire and comedy, as represented by the contrasting prudish and permissive social attitudes of two female visitors. Two years later came Fudge in Ireland (London 1822), a hybrid work that has been ascribed to William Russell Macdonald (1787-1854) and describing itself as "a collection of letters, poems and legends, concerning the castle, the courts, the college, the corporation and the country at large".

Longman had originally proposed the writing of a sequel, The Fudge Family in London, but before Moore got round to it the subject was taken up in part by another imitator. In two sections of this, The Fudge Family in England (London 1823), another new character is introduced in the shape of a French Fudge who describes his stay in the English capital to his English relative in Paris. While Moore was living in financial exile abroad at this period, he had begun writing instead The Fudge Family in Italy but had to abandon the project. It was not until 1835 that he finally wrote his own variation on the theme, The Fudges in England, set in a spa-town reminiscent of the scene of Anstey's New Bath Guide.

== Bibliography ==
- Kelly, Ronan. Bard of Erin: The Life of Thomas Moore, Penguin Books, 2009
- Moore, Jane. "Introduction to The Fudge Family in Paris" in British Satire 1785-1840, vol.5 (Routledge 2016)
- Moore, Thomas. The Fudge Family in Paris, London 1818
- A. V. Seaton, "Getting Socially on the Road: The short, happy life of the anapaestic tourism narrative, 1766-1830", in Travel Writing, Visual Culture, and Form, 1760-1900 (Palgrave Macmillan 2016)
