= The Gypsy Prince =

The Gypsy Prince is a comic opera with a libretto by Thomas Moore and the music written in collaboration between Moore and Michael Kelly.

== Background ==
It was premiered on 24 July 1801 in London at the Theatre Royal, Haymarket, under the directorship of George Colman and with Kelly in the title role. The two men were initially happy to collaborate with each other, but Moore objected to Kelly's making corrections to his work – something that Mozart had allowed when Kelly had earlier worked with him. The story is set in Spain where a young child is taken by gypsies and grows to become a gypsy leader. After rescuing a man from the Inquisition he is arrested and faces execution only to discover the man trying his case is his long-lost father.

The work was not a great success, although the music was more popular. The piece was performed on ten occasions until the end of August 1801 and then withdrawn. After his disappointment with this work Moore chose not to write again for the stage for a decade until the writing of M.P. in 1811. Michael Kelly published the (vocal) score in his own publishing company in the same year.
