= Memoirs of the Life of Richard Brinsley Sheridan =

1825 biography by Thomas Moore

- Author: Thomas Moore
- Language: English
- Genre: Biography
- Publisher: Longmans
- Publication date: 1825
- Publication place: United Kingdom
- Media type: Print

Memoirs of the Life of Richard Brinsley Sheridan was an 1825 biography written by Thomas Moore about the life of the playwright and politician Richard Brinsley Sheridan (1751–1816). It was published after nine years work, on and off, and had been delayed by a legal dispute over the use of Sheridan's papers. It was published in October 1825 by Longmans in two volumes under the full title of Memoirs of the Life of the Right Honourable Richard Brinsley Sheridan.

The first volume focused on Sheridan's early life and his success in the theatre. The second volume follows the ups and downs of his political career, as a Whig Member of Parliament. The work was a great success and sold a thousand copies in ten days, and had gone through three editions in a fortnight.

Defending his work in a preface of the fifth edition Moore observed "The Tory, of course, is shocked by my Whiggism; – the Whigs are rather displeased at my candour in conceding that they have sometimes been wrong, and the Tories right; while the Radical in his patriotic hatred of both parties, is angry with me for allowing any merit to either".

The work was part of a long-term shift in Moore's work and reputation. He had previously been regarded as a light poet and satirist but had now produced a novel Memoirs of Captain Rock and Sheridan's biography. In the wake of the success of the Sheridan work, Moore began working on a biography of his old friend Lord Byron who had died in 1824.

== Bibliography ==
- Kelly, Ronan. Bard of Erin: The Life of Thomas Moore. Penguin Books, 2009.
