= Charles Frederick Horn =

British composer

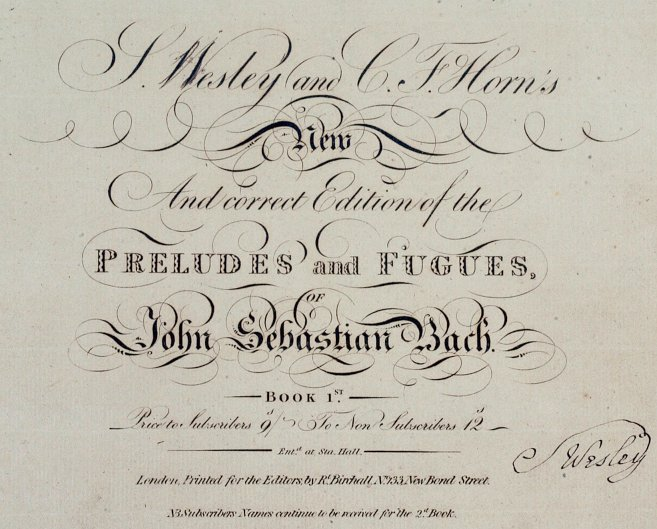
Part of the title page of the first English edition of Johann Sebastian Bach's Well-Tempered Clavier, which Horn edited with Samuel Wesley, published in 1810

Charles Frederick Horn (24 February 1762 – 3 August 1830) was an English musician and composer. Born in the Holy Roman Empire, he emigrated to London with few possessions and no knowledge of the English language, yet rose to become a music teacher in the Royal Household. As an editor and arranger, he helped introduce the music of Johann Sebastian Bach to England.

== Life ==
Born in Nordhausen, Holy Roman Empire to John Wolfgang Horn and Sophia Dorothea Shenaman, Charles Frederick Horn was the third of their four children. According to the memoirs of Charles Frederick's son, Charles Edward Horn, John Wolfgang wished for his son to become a surveyor. Horn would often furtively practice music instead; when his father found out, he destroyed the family's clavichord in the hopes of preventing his son from becoming distracted from his studies. This, though, did not dissuade Horn from taking music lessons from Nordhausen organist Christoph Gottlieb Schröter.

On Schröter's death in 1782, Horn decided to move to Paris to try a living as a musician. He left his home with little money and a suitcase of clothes. En route to Paris, he encountered a stranger in Hamburg by the name of Winkelman, who persuaded the impressionable Horn that London would better serve the aspirations of a young German musician than France. Winkelman accompanied him to London, but upon arriving, stole almost all of Horn's money and disappeared. Destitute and knowing no English, he wandered the streets of London before encountering a German-speaking Irishman, who sympathised with his plight. The man took Horn to the piano shop of Longman and Broderip at Cheapside, where Horn played the piano for its co-proprietor, Francis Fane Broderip. Impressed, Broderip introduced Horn to the Saxon ambassador John Maurice de Brühl. de Brühl recommended Horn to Granville Leveson-Gower, 1st Marquess of Stafford, who hired him as his daughters' music teacher.

The appointment meant that Trentham Hall, Leveson-Gower's estate in Staffordshire, became Horn's new residence. There, he met and fell in love with Diana Dupont, the French tutor of Leveson-Gower's daughters. The two married on 28 September 1785, and subsequently moved to London, where Dupont gave birth to the couple's first child, Charles Edward Horn, on 21 June 1786. Horn published his first composition, Six Sonatas for the Piano, Violin, and Violoncello (Op. 1), earlier that year in May. Subscribers to the work included Muzio Clementi, Johann Peter Salomon, George IV (then the Prince of Wales), and Lady Caroline Waldegrave. The latter introduced Horn to Queen Charlotte, who appointed him as her personal music tutor; he instructed the Queen twice a week from 20 October 1789 to 9 October 1793. While in her service, he maintained two homes, one in London and the other in Windsor. He was also engaged from June 1789 to October 1812 to teach music to the royal princesses. During his employment in the royal household, he composed a set of three Sonatas (Op. 2), which he dedicated to the Queen.

Horn continued composing numerous pieces, but he is perhaps best known for his work in arranging and editing music—in particular, the works of Bach. In 1807, he published an arrangement for two violins, viola, and cello/piano for 12 of Bach's organ fugues. The next year, he met Samuel Wesley, with whom he would collaborate in editing, arranging, and publishing the first ever complete edition of Bach's six trio sonatas for organ (1809) and the first English edition of the Well-Tempered Clavier (1810). Horn, whom Wesley described as "indefatigable", had plans to publish all of Bach's works, but this never came to fruition.

In June 1824, King George IV appointed Horn as organist of St George's Chapel at Windsor Castle. He stepped down after King George's death on 26 June 1830, and died shortly after in Windsor. He was buried at St George's Chapel. Horn was survived by his wife, with whom he had seven children.

== Selected works ==
=== Compositions ===
- Six Sonatas for the Piano, Violin, and Violoncello (Op. 1, 1786)
- Three Sonatas for the Piano Forte or Harpsichord, with an Accompaniment for a Violin or a Flute (Op. 2, 1791)
- Three Sonatas (Op. 3, 1794)
- Twelve Country Dance for the Piano Forte (1796)
- A Collection of Divertimentos (1804)
- The Boatman (1817)
- Themes with Variations (c. 1823)

=== Arrangements and editions ===
- A Favorite Overture – Joseph Haydn (1786)
- Sinfonia for a Grand Orchestra – Wolfgang Amadeus Mozart (c. 1790)
- Celebrated Concertante – Ignaz Pleyel (c. 1790)
- (with Samuel Wesley) A Sett of 12 Fugues Composed for the Organ by Sebastian Bach arranged as Quartettos – Johann Sebastian Bach (1807)
- (with Samuel Wesley) A Trio composed originally for the organ by John Sebastian Bach and now adapted for 3 hands – Johann Sebastian Bach (1809)
- (with Samuel Wesley) New and correct edition of the Preludes and Fugues of John Sebastian Bach – Johann Sebastian Bach (1810)
