= The Fudges in England =

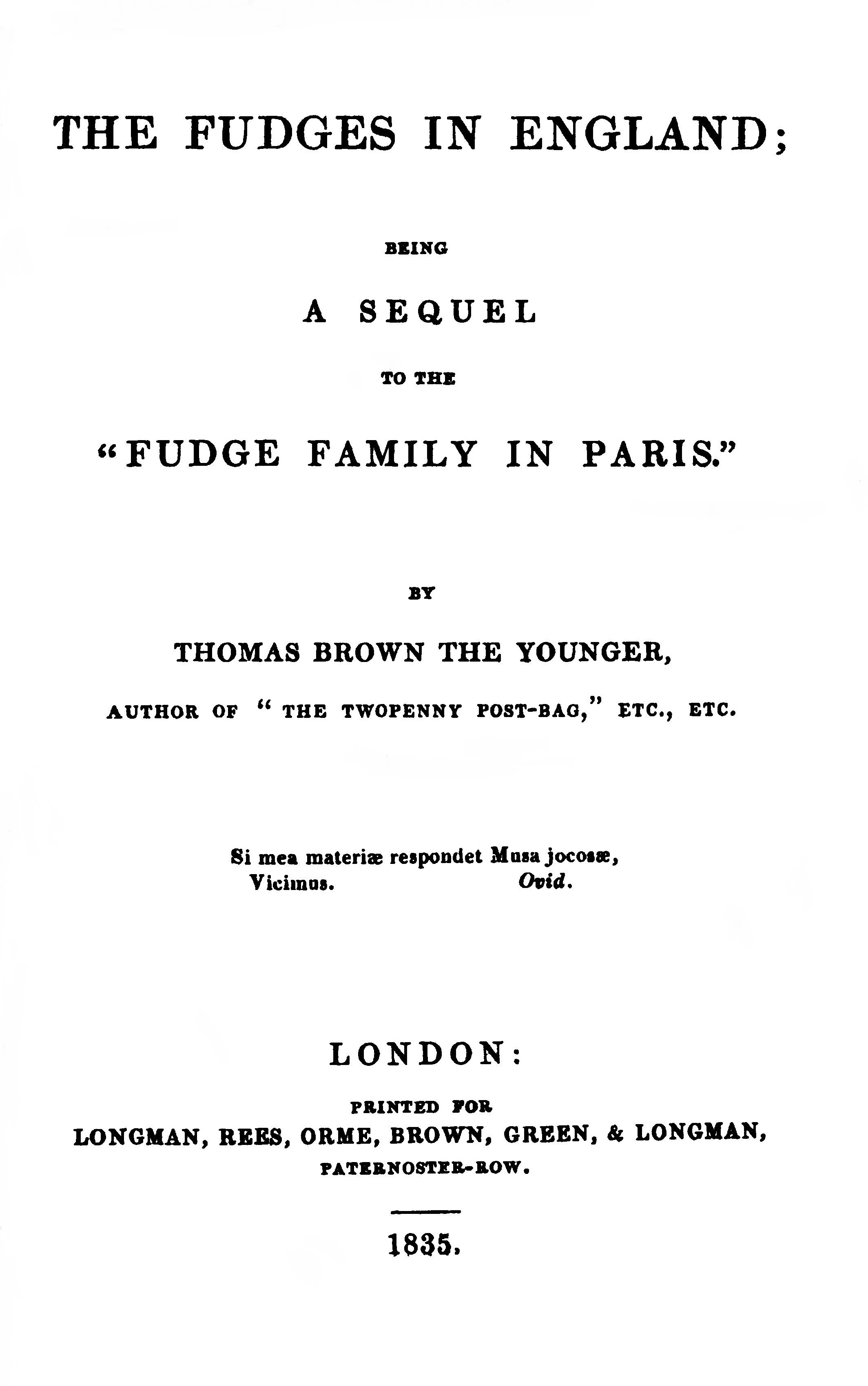
First edition title page

The Fudges in England is an 1835 sequel to Thomas Moore's 1818 work The Fudge Family in Paris, which had depicted the visit of the fictional British Fudge Family to Paris, where the daughter Biddy had fallen in love with a young man whom she had taken to be the King of Prussia but was in fact a draper. The original work was extremely popular and Moore had received requests to write a follow-up. He began working on The Fudge Family In Italy, but abandoned it and it wasn't until seventeen years after the original that the sequel was released.

The sequel is set some years later, in a spa town likely to be Bath, where the grown-up Biddy has travelled. Biddy has since become an evangelical Protestant, and because of the large inheritance she is expected to receive she is a target for fortune-hunting Irish suitors. One of these is a "Mick on the make", Patrick Magan, who secretly prefers Biddy's niece Fanny. Magan's attempts to woo Biddy are undermined by a rival, Mortimer O'Mulligan, who had converted from Catholicism to Protestantism in the hope of enriching himself. He marries Biddy while Magan elopes with Fanny. The story concludes with Biddy's rich uncle leaving his money to Fanny rather than Biddy, and O'Mulligan left penniless.

The work was less successful than Moore's earlier work and was not widely reviewed, probably due to a decline in Moore's popularity, although its critical reception was good. The Times wrote that Moore's observations were "as keen, and his satire as pungent, as ever". The work was the beginning of the end of Moore's writing career, and most of the rest of his work was on his unsuccessful four-volume History of Ireland.

It is likely that the character of Mortimer O'Mulligan was based on the real-life Mortimer O'Sullivan who had been a fierce critic of Moore.

== Bibliography ==
- Kelly, Ronan. Bard of Erin: The Life of Thomas Moore. Penguin Books, 2009.
