= Thomas Moore =

Irish poet, singer and songwriter (1779–1852)

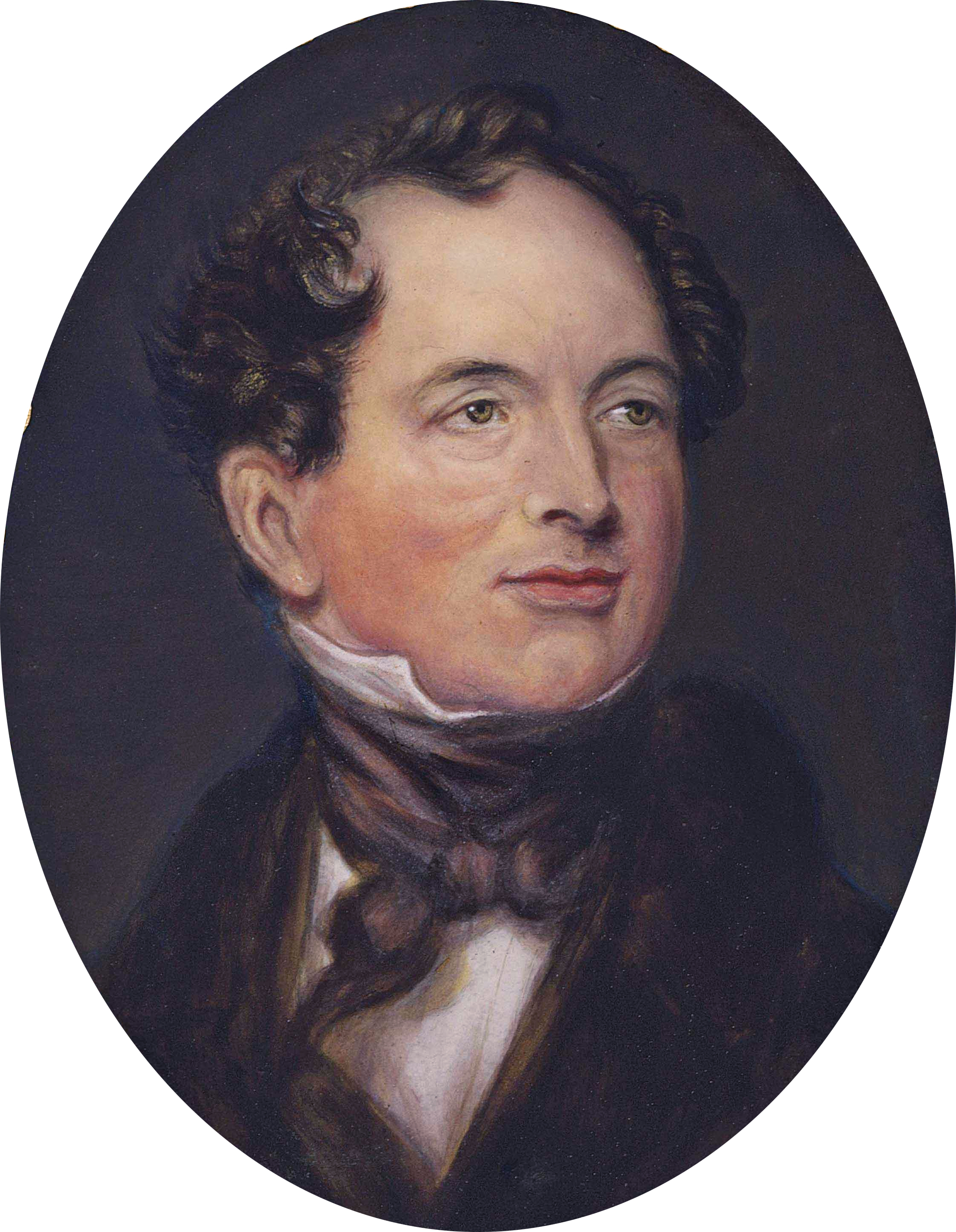
- Thomas Moore, by Thomas Lawrence
- Born: 28 May 1779; Dublin, Ireland
- Died: 25 February 1852 (aged 72); Sloperton Cottage, Bromham, Wiltshire, England
- Resting place: St. Nicholas' Churchyard, Bromham, Wiltshire, England
- Education: Trinity College Dublin (BA); Middle Temple, London (LLB)
- Occupations: Poet, writer, lyricist
- Spouse: Elizabeth Dyke
- Writing career
- Language: English
- Period: Georgian era, Victorian era
- Notable works: Irish Melodies; Memoirs of Captain Rock (1824); Lalla Rookh (1817); Letters & Journals of Lord Byron; The Last Rose of Summer (1803)
- Movement: Romanticism

Thomas Moore (28 May 1779 – 25 February 1852) was an Irish writer, poet, and lyricist. Widely regarded in his lifetime as Ireland's "national bard", his fame and reputation rested primarily on the popularity of his Irish Melodies. In these, Moore set to old Irish tunes verses that spoke to a narrative of Irish dispossession, loss, and resistance. In his romantic work Lalla Rookh (1817), in which these same themes are explored in an elaborate orientalist allegory, Moore achieved wider critical recognition and popularity. Translated into several languages, and adapted and arranged for musical performance by, among others, Robert Schumann, the chivalric verse-narrative established Moore as one of the leading exemplars of European romanticism.

In England, Moore moved in aristocratic Whig circles where, in addition to a salon performer, he was appreciated as a squib writer and master of political satire. Chief among his targets, in successive Tory governments, was Lord Castlereagh in whose promises of "emancipation" Moore believed his fellow Catholics in Ireland had been deceived. In the verse novel The Fudge Family in Paris (1818), and its sequels, he pillories the Foreign Secretary for employing the same "faithless craft" used to press Ireland into a union with Great Britain to accommodate restoration and reaction in Europe.

Wary in Ireland of an overtly Catholic place-seeking nationalism, Moore refused a nomination to stand with Daniel O'Connell and his Repeal Association for the Westminster parliament. His broader sympathies were expressed in his several prose works, including a biography of the United Irish leader Lord Edward Fitzgerald (1831) and the Memoirs of Captain Rock (1824). Complementing Maria Edgeworth's Castle Rackrent (1800), the satirical novel is the story, not of Anglo-Irish landowners, but of their exhausted tenants driven to the semi-insurrection of Whiteboyism.

Moore continues to be remembered chiefly for his Melodies (typically "The Minstrel Boy" and "The Last Rose of Summer"). He is also recalled, less generously, for the role he is thought to have played in the destruction of the memoirs of his friend, Lord Byron.

== Early life and artistic launch ==
Thomas Moore was born to Anastasia Codd from Wexford and John Moore from County Kerry over his parents' grocery shop in Aungier Street, Dublin, He had two younger sisters, Kate and Ellen. Moore showed an early interest in music and performance, staging musical plays with his friends and entertaining hope of being an actor. In Dublin he attended Samuel Whyte's co-educational English grammar school, where he was schooled in Latin and Greek and became fluent in French and Italian. By age fourteen he had had one of his poems published in a new literary magazine called the Anthologia Hibernica (“Irish Anthology”).

Samuel Whyte had taught Richard Barnsley Sheridan, Irish playwright and English Whig politician, of whom Moore later was to write a biography.

=== Trinity College and the United Irishmen ===
In 1795, Moore was among the first Catholics admitted to Trinity College Dublin, preparing, as his mother had hoped, for a career in law. Through the literary salon of the poet and satirist Henrietta Battier, and his friends Robert Emmet, with him at Trinity, and Edward Hudson, Moore was connected to the popular politics of the capital agitated by the French Revolution and by the prospect of a French invasion. With their encouragement, in 1797, Moore wrote an appeal to his fellow students to resist the proposal, then being canvassed by the English-appointed Dublin Castle administration, to secure Ireland by incorporating the kingdom in a union with Great Britain. At the same time, in what he was later to describe in a preface to his Melodies as his "ardour for the national cause", he had popped "privately into the letterbox" of the United Irish paper, The Press, "a short Fragment in imitation of Ossian". Mirroring the conceit of James Macpherson's Ossian cycle (poems which the Scottish writer claimed to have discovered and translated from Gaelic), it called on the Irish to recall the heroism of their ancestors and strike for freedom.

In April 1798, Moore was interrogated at Trinity by the Lord Chancellor of Ireland, John Fitzgibbon, but acquitted on the charge of being a party, through the Society of United Irishmen, to sedition. He had not joined his friends in taking the United Irish oath, and he was to play no part in the republican rebellion of 1798 (Moore was at home, ill in bed), or in the uprising in Dublin for which Emmet was executed in 1803. Later, in a biography of the United Irish leader Lord Edward Fitzgerald (1831), he made clear his sympathies, not hiding his regret that the French expedition under General Hoche failed in December 1796 to effect a landing. Moore pays homage to Emmet's sacrifice on the gallows, and to the grief of his fiancée Sarah Curran, in the song "O, Breathe Not His Name" (1808).

=== London society and first success ===
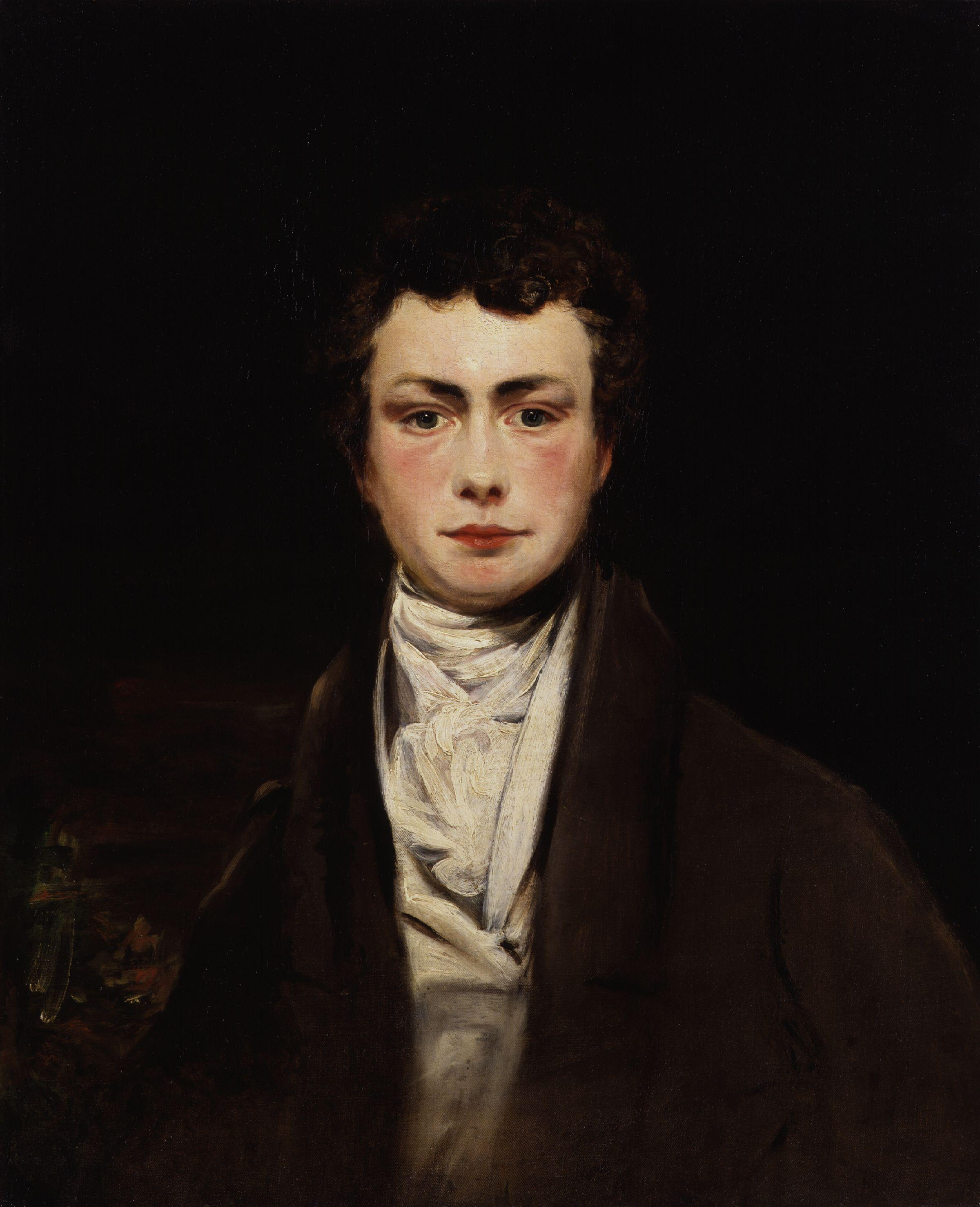
Moore as a young man

In 1799, Moore continued his law studies at Middle Temple in London. The impecunious student was assisted by friends in the expatriate Irish community in London, including Barbara, widow of Arthur Chichester, 1st Marquess of Donegall, the landlord and borough-owner of Belfast.

Moore's translations of Anacreon, celebrating wine, women and song, were published in 1800 with a dedication to the Prince of Wales. His introduction to the future prince regent and King, George IV was a high point in Moore's ingratiation with aristocratic and literary circles in London, a success due in great degree to his talents as a singer and songwriter. In the same year he collaborated briefly as a librettist with Michael Kelly in the comic opera, The Gypsy Prince, staged at the Theatre Royal, Haymarket,

In 1801, Moore hazarded a collection of his own verse: Poetical Works of the Late Thomas Little Esq.. The pseudonym may have been advised by their juvenile eroticism. Moore's celebration of kisses and embraces skirted contemporary standards of propriety. When these tightened in the Victorian era, they were to put an end to what was a relative publishing success.

== Travels and family ==
=== Observations of America and duel with critic ===
In the hope of future advancement, Moore reluctantly sailed from London in 1803 to take up a government post secured through the favours of Francis Rawdon-Hastings, 2nd Earl of Moira. Lord Moira was a man distinct in his class for having, on the eve of the rebellion in Ireland, continued to protest against government and loyalist outrages, and to have urged a policy of conciliation. Moore was to be the registrar of the Admiralty Prize Court in Bermuda. Although as late as 1925 still recalled as "the poet laureate" of the island, Moore found life on Bermuda sufficiently dull that after six months he appointed a deputy and left for an extended tour of North America.

As in London, Moore secured high-society introductions. But of many of his hosts he had a low opinion including, with reports of a slave mistress (Sally Hemings), of President Thomas Jefferson: "The weary statesman for repose has fled/ From the halls of council to his negro shed . . . / And dreams of freedom in his slave's embrace!" Moore's reference to the "black Aspasia of the present of the United States", ensured that Epistles, Odes, and Other Poems (1806), published after his return to Britain in 1804, was, despite its general catalogue of complaints about America and Americans, immediately reprinted in Philadelphia and was to run into several American editions.

Moore later conceded that, having consorted too closely in the United States with émigré European aristocrats and their friends among the opposition Federalists, he had developed a somewhat "tainted", somewhat partisan, view of the new republic. United Irish exiles, among them Robert Emmet's brother, Thomas Addis Emmet, a prominent abolitionist, were in Jefferson's Democratic-Republican camp.

Meanwhile In Britain, Moore's allusions to his real and imagined escapades with American women scandalised reviewers. In the Edinburgh Review (July 1806), Francis Jeffrey denounced Moore as "the most licentious of modern versifiers", a poet whose aim is "to impose corruption upon his readers, by concealing it under the mask of refinement." Moore challenged his Jeffrey to a duel but their confrontation was interrupted by the police. In what seemed to be a "pattern" in Moore's life ("it was possible to condemn [Moore] only if you did not know him"), the two then became fast friends.

Moore, nonetheless, was dogged by the report that the police had found that the pistol given to Jeffrey was unloaded. In his satirical English Bards and Scotch Reviewers (1809), Byron, who had himself been stung by one of Jeffrey's reviews, suggested Moore's weapon was also "leadless": "on examination, the balls of the pistols, like the courage of the combatants, were found to have evaporated". To Moore, this was scarcely more satisfactory, and he wrote to Byron implying that unless the remarks were clarified, Byron, too, would be challenged. In the event, when Byron, who had been abroad, returned there was again reconciliation and a lasting friendship.

In 1809, Moore was elected as a member to the American Philosophical Society in Philadelphia.

One of the pieces in Epistles, Odes and Other Poems—later gathered together as “Poems Relating to America” in the second volume of Moore's Poetical Works (1840)—became a recognised influence in nineteenth-century French-Canadian poetry. A source of Irish-Canadian pride, “A Canadian Boat Song. Written on the River St. Lawrence” also contributed to the rhetoric of Canadian nationalism (which, paradoxically, was to heightened by the cross-border raids of Irish-American Fenians).

=== Marriage and children ===
Between 1808 and 1810, Moore appeared each year in Kilkenny, Ireland, with a charitable mixed repertory of professional players and high-society amateurs. He favoured comic roles in plays like Sheridan's The Rivals and O'Keeffe's The Castle of Andalusia. Among the professionals, on stage in Kilkenny with her sister, the tragedienne-to-be Mary Ann Duff, was Elizabeth "Bessy" Dyke. In 1811, Moore married Bessy in St Martin-in-the-Fields, London. Together with Bessy's lack of a dowry, the Protestant ceremony may have been the reason why Moore kept the match for some time secret from his parents. Bessy shrank from fashionable society to such an extent that many of her husband's friends never met her (some of them jokingly doubted her very existence). Those who did held her in high regard.

The couple first set up house in London, then in the country at Kegworth, Leicestershire, and in Lord Moira's neighbourhood at Mayfield Cottage in Staffordshire, and finally in Sloperton Cottage in Wiltshire near the country seat of another close friend and patron, Henry Petty-Fitzmaurice, 3rd Marquess of Lansdowne. Their company included Sheridan and John Philpot Curran, both in their bitter final years.

Thomas and Bessy had five children, none of whom survived them. Three girls died young, and both sons lost their lives as young men. One of them, Thomas Landsdowne Parr Moore, as a lowly officer fought first with the British Army in Afghanistan, and then with French Foreign Legion in Algeria. He was dying of tuberculosis that riddled the family when, according to Foreign Legion records, he was killed in action on 6 February 1846. Despite these heavy personal losses, the marriage of Thomas Moore is generally regarded to have been a happy one.

=== Debt exile, last meeting with Byron ===
In 1818, it was discovered that the man Moore had appointed his deputy in Bermuda had embezzled 6,000 pounds sterling, a large sum for which Moore was liable. To escape debtor's prison, in September 1819, Moore left for France, travelling with Lord John Russell (future Whig prime minister and editor of Moore's journals and letters). In Venice in October, Moore saw Byron for the last time. Byron entrusted him with a manuscript for his memoirs, which, as his literary executor, Moore promised to have published after Byron's death.

In Paris, Moore was joined by Bessy and the children. His social life was busy, often involving meetings with Irish and British and travellers such as Maria Edgeworth and William Wordsworth. However, his attempt to bridge the gulf in his connections between his exiled fellow countrymen and members of the British establishment was not always successful. In 1821, several emigres, prominent among them Myles Byrne (a veteran of Vinegar Hill and of Napoleon's Irish Legion) refused to attend a St Patrick's day dinner Moore had organised in Paris because of the presiding presence of Wellesley Pole Long, a nephew of the Duke of Wellington. Byrne relented, only to engage in a row over a toast proposed to Thomas Reynolds, a reputed '98 informer.

Once Moore learned the Bermuda debt had been partly cleared with the help of Lord Lansdowne (whom Moore repaid almost immediately by a draft on Longman, his publisher), the family, after more than a year, returned to Sloperton Cottage.

== Political and historical writing ==
=== Squib writer for the Whigs ===
To support his family Moore entered the field of political squib writing on behalf of his Whig friends and patrons. The Whigs had been split by the divided response of Edmund Burke and Charles Fox to the French Revolution. But with the antics of the Prince Regent, and in particular, his highly public efforts to disgrace and divorce Princess Caroline, proving a lightning rod for popular discontent, they were finding new unity and purpose.

From the "Whigs as Whigs", Moore claimed not to have received "even the semblance of a favour" (Lord Moira, they "hardly acknowledge as one of themselves"). And with exceptions "easily counted", Moore was convinced that there was "just as much selfishness and as much low-party spirit among them generally as the Tories". But for Moore, the fact that the Prince Regent held fast against Catholic admission to parliament may have been reason sufficient to turn on his former friend and patron. Moore's Horatian mockery of the Prince in the pages of The Morning Chronicle were collected in Intercepted Letters, or the Two-Penny Post-Bag (1813). The work went through fourteen editions.

=== The lampooning of Castlereagh ===
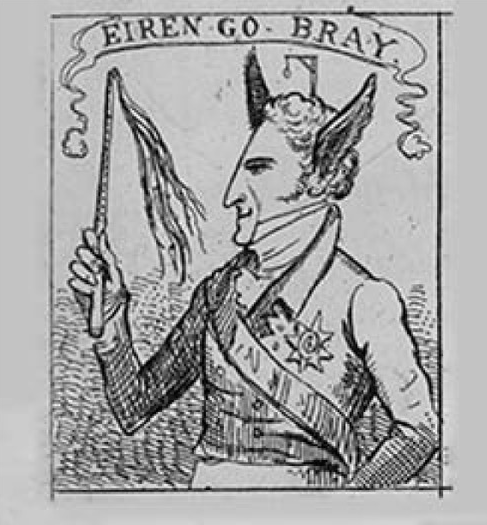
Bloody Castlereagh, 1798

Another, and possibly more personal, target for Moore was the Foreign Secretary Lord Castlereagh. A reform-minded Ulster Presbyterian turned Anglican Tory, as Irish Secretary Castlereagh had been ruthless in the suppression of the United Irishmen and in pushing the Act of Union through the Irish Parliament.

In what were the "verbal equivalents of the political cartoons of the day", Tom Crib's Memorial to Congress (1818), To the Ship in Which Lord Castlereagh Sailed to the Continent (1818) and Fables for the Holy Alliance (1823), Moore lampoons Castlereagh's deference to the reactionary interests of Britain's continental allies. At the Congress of Vienna, the Foreign Secretary had signed "away the Rights of Man/ To Russian threats and Austrian juggle" and, content with but a declaration against the slave trade, had left "the sinking African/ To fall without one saving struggle--".

In the verse novel, The Fudge Family in Paris (1818), the family of an Irishman working as a propagandist for Castlereagh in Paris, are accompanied by an accomplished tutor and classicist, Phelim Connor. An upright but disillusioned Irish Catholic, his letters to a friend reflect Moore's own views. Connor's regular epistolary denunciations of Castlereagh have two recurrent themes. The first is Castlereagh as "the embodiment of the sickness with which Ireland had infected British politics as a consequence of the union": "We sent thee Castlereagh – as heaps of dead Have slain their slayers by the pest they spread". The second is that at the time of the Acts of Union Castlereagh's support for Catholic emancipation had been disingenuous. Castlereagh had been master of "that faithless craft", which can "court the slave, can swear he shall be freed", but then "basely spurns him" when his "point is gain'd".

Through a mutual connection, Moore learned that Castlereagh had been particularly stung by the verses of the Tutor in the Fudge Family. For openly casting the same dispersions against the former Chief Secretary—that he bloodied his hands in 1798 and deliberately deceived Catholics at the time of the Union—in 1811 the London-based Irish publisher, and former United Irishman, Peter Finnerty was sentenced to eighteen months for libel.

=== The Memoirs of Captain Rock ===
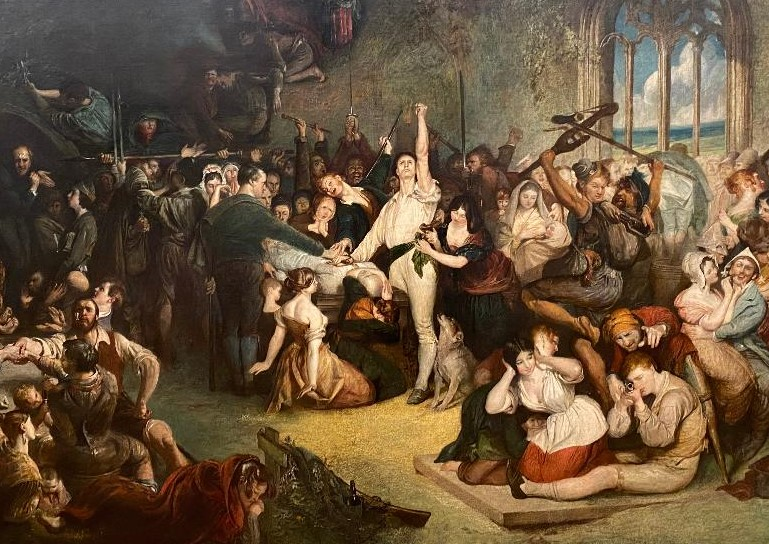
The Installation of Captain Rock by Daniel Maclise, 1834

As a partisan squib writer, Moore played a role not dissimilar to that of Jonathan Swift a century earlier. Moore greatly admired Swift as a satirist, but charged him with caring no more for the "misery" of his Roman Catholic countrymen "than his own Gulliver for the sufferings of so many disenfranchised Yahoos". The Memoirs of Captain Rock (1824) might have been Moore's response to those who questioned whether the son of a Dublin grocer entertaining English audiences from his home in Wiltshire was himself connected to the great mass of his countrymen – to those whose remitted rents helped sustain the great houses among which he was privileged to move.

The Memoirs relate the history of Ireland as told by a contemporary, the scion of a Catholic family that lost land in successive English settlements. The character, Captain Rock, is folkloric but the history is in earnest. By the end of the Penal Law era his family has been reduced to the "class of wretched cottiers". Exposed to the voracious demands of spendthrift Anglo-Irish landlords (pilloried by Maria Edgeworth in Castle Rackrent), both father and son assume captaincies among the "White-boys, Oak-boys, and Hearts-of Steel", the tenant conspiracies that attack tax collectors, terrorise the landlords' agents and violently resist evictions.

The Memoirs arose out of a tour of rural Ireland on which Moore had been was accompanied by Lansdowne, whose estates in Ireland were extensive. For Landsdowne, as for Russell and other of Moore's Whig friends who celebrated his novel's success, it may have been significant that when the 300-year chronicle finally catches up with Captain Rock in the post-Napoleonic depression, the focus of violent discontent is no longer Catholic dispossession or Anglo-Irish landlordism per se. The Rockites' fury is directed at the tithes levied on top of rents on behalf of the Anglican clergy. But for this shift to "safer ground", it is unlikely that The Times of London would have praised the author for his "love of justice".

In Ireland, Ascendancy opinion was outraged. Moore's work elicited a riposte, dramatising the "Popish" and "heartless" character of the "village banditti": Charlotte Elizabeth Tonna's The Rockite; An Irish Story (1829).

Low-level agrarian warfare continued through, and beyond, the Great Irish Famine of the 1840s. It was only after this catastrophe which, as Prime Minister, Russell failed in any practical measure to allay, that British governments began to assume responsibility for agrarian conditions. At the time of Captain Rock's publication (1824), the commanding issue of the day was not tithes or tenant rights. It was the final instalment of Catholic Emancipation: Castlereagh's unredeemed promise of Catholic admission to parliament.

=== Letter to the Roman Catholics of Dublin ===
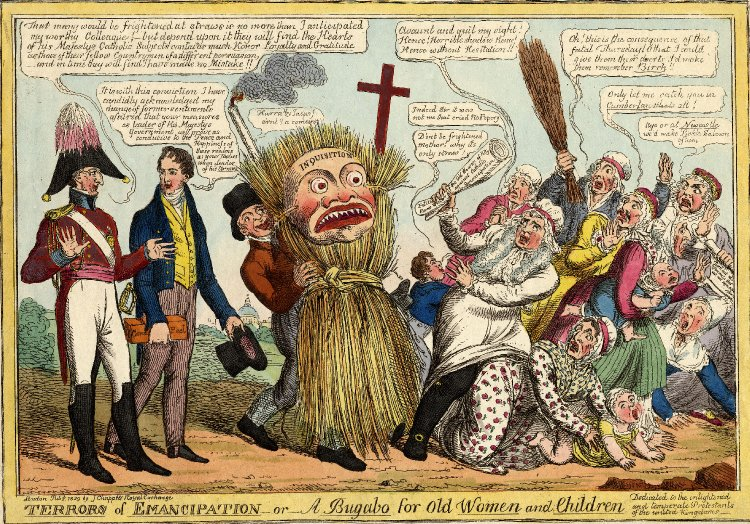
"Terrors of Emancipation" – The Roman Catholic Relief Act, 1829

Since within a united kingdom, Irish Catholics would be reduced to a distinct minority, Castlereagh's promises of their parliamentary emancipation seemed credible at the time of the Union. But the provision was stripped out of the union bills when in England the admission of Catholics to the "Protestant Constitution" encountered the standard objection: that as subject to political direction from Rome, Catholics could not be entrusted with the defence of constitutional liberties. Moore rallied to the "liberal compromise" proposed by Henry Grattan, who had moved the enfranchisement of Catholics in the old Irish parliament. Fears of "Popery" were to be allayed by according the Crown a "negative control", a veto, on the appointment of Catholic bishops.

In an open Letter to the Roman Catholics of Dublin (1810), Moore noted that the Irish bishops (legally resident in Ireland only from 1782) had themselves been willing to comply with a practice otherwise universal in Europe. Conceding a temporal check of papal authority, he argued, was in Ireland's Gallican tradition. In the time of "her native monarchy", the Pope had had no share in the election of Irish bishops. "Slavish notions of papal authority" developed only as a consequence of the English conquest. The native aristocracy had sought in Rome a "spiritual alliance" against the new "temporal tyranny" at home. In resisting royal assent and in placing "their whole hierarchy at the disposal of the Roman court", Irish Catholics would "unnecessarily" be acting in "remembrance of times, which it is the interest of all parties [Catholic and Protestant, Irish and English] to forget".

Within a year, however, Moore abandoned these arguments. They had made little headway against the man Moore decried as a demagogue, but who, as a result of his uncompromising stand, was to emerge as the undisputed leader of the Catholic interest in Ireland, Daniel O’Connell.

Even when, in 1814, the Curia itself (then still in silent alliance with Britain against Napoleon) proposed that bishops be "personally acceptable to the king", O'Connell was opposed. Better, he declared, that Irish Catholics "remain for ever without emancipation" rather than allow the king and his ministers "to interfere" with the Pope's appointment of Irish prelates. At stake was the unity of church and people. "Licensed" by the government, the bishops and their priests would be no more regarded than the ministers of the established Church of Ireland.

When final emancipation came in 1829, the price O'Connell paid was the disenfranchisement of the forty-shilling freeholders – those who, in the decisive protest against Catholics exclusion, defied their landlords in voting O'Connell in the 1828 County Clare by-election. The "purity" of the Irish church was sustained. Moore lived to see the exceptional papal discretion thus confirmed reshaping the Irish hierarchy culminating in 1850 with the appointment of the Rector of the Sacred Congregation for the Propagation of the Faith in Rome, Paul Cullen, as Primate Archbishop of Armagh.

=== Travels of an Irish Gentleman in Search of a Religion ===
Portrait of Thomas Moore by Martin Archer Shee, c.1817, National Gallery of Ireland, Dublin.

In a call heeded by Protestants of all denominations, in 1822 the new Church of Ireland Archbishop of Dublin, William Magee, declared the absolute necessity of winning an Irish majority for the Reformed faith — a "Second Reformation". Carrying "religious tracts expressly written for the edification of the Irish peasantry", the "editor" of Captain Rock's Memoirs is an English missionary in the ensuing "bible war". Catholics, who coalesced behind O'Connell in the Catholic Association, believed that proselytising advantage was being sought in hunger and distress (that tenancies and food were being used to secure converts), and that the usual political interests were at play.

Moore's narrator in Travels of an Irish Gentleman in Search of a Religion (1833) is again fictional. He is, as Moore had been, a Catholic student at Trinity College. On news of Emancipation (passage of the 1829 Catholic Relief Bill), he exclaims: "Thank God! I may now, if I like, turn Protestant". Oppressed by the charge that Catholics are "a race of obstinate and obsolete religionists […] unfit for freedom", and freed from "the point of honour" that would have prevented him from abandoning his church in the face of continuing sanctions, he sets out to explore the tenets of the "true" religion.

Predictably, the resolve the young man draws from his theological studies is to remain true to the faith of his forefathers (not to exchange "the golden armour of the old Catholic Saints" for "heretical brass"). The argument, however, was not the truth of Catholic doctrine. It was the inconsistency and fallacy of the bible preachers. Moore's purpose, he was later to write, was to put "upon record" the "disgust" he felt at "the arrogance with which most Protestant parsons assume […] credit for being the only true Christians, and the insolence with which […] they denounce all Catholics as idolators and Antichrist". Had his young man found "among the Orthodox of the first [Christian] ages" one "particle" of their rejection of the supposed "corruptions" of the Roman church – justification not by faith alone but also by good works, transubstantiation, and veneration of saints, relics and images — he would have been persuaded.

Once again, the success of Moore's work elicited an Ascendancy response. The Second Travels of an Irish Gentleman in Search of Religion (1833) is a vindication of the reformed faith by an author described as "not the editor of Captain Rock's Memoirs" — the Spanish exile and Protestant convert Joseph Blanco White. A critical Guide to an Irish Gentleman in Search of a Religion (1833) was also offered by a second Catholic apostate, the Church of Ireland clergyman Mortimer Sullivan.

In 1816, Moore had published a A Series of Sacred Songs, Duets and Trios of which the first, "Thou art, O God", became a popular hymn. But despite acknowledging Catholicism as Ireland's "national faith", and the example of a devout mother, Moore appears to have abandoned the formal practice of his religion as soon as he entered Trinity.

Brendan Clifford, editor of Moore's political writings, interprets Moore's philosophy as "cheerful paganism", or, at the very least, "à la carte Catholicism" in which Moore favoured "what scriptural Protestantism hated: the music, the theatricality, the symbolism, the idolatry".

=== Sheridan, Fitzgerald and The History of Ireland ===
In 1825, Moore's Memoirs of the Life of Richard Brinsley Sheridan was finally published after nine years of work on and off. It proved popular, went through a number of editions, and helped establish Moore's reputation among literary critics. The work had a political aspect: Sheridan was not only a playwright, he was a Whig politician and a friend of Fox. Moore judged Sheridan an uncertain friend of reform. But he has Sheridan articulate in his own words a good part of what was to be the United Irish case for separation from England.

Writing in 1784 to his brother, Sheridan explains that the "subordinate situation [of Ireland] prevents the formation of any party among us, like those you have in England, composed of person acting upon certain principles, and pledged to support each other". Without the prospect of obtaining power – which in Ireland is "lodged in a branch of the English government" (the Dublin Castle executive) – there is little point in the members of parliament, no matter how personally disinterested, collaborating for any public purpose. Without an accountable executive the interests of the nation are systematically neglected.

It is against this, the truncated state of politics in Ireland, that Moore sees Lord Edward Fitzgerald, a "Protestant reformer" who wished for "a democratic House of Commons and the Emancipation of his Catholic countrymen", driven toward the republican separatism of the United Irishmen. He absolves Fitzgerald of recklessness: but for a contrary wind, decisive French assistance would have been delivered by General Hoche at Bantry in December 1796. In his own Memoirs, Moore acknowledges his The Life and Death of Lord Edward Fitzgerald (1831) as a "justification of the men of '98 – the ultimi Romanorum of our country".

Moore's History of Ireland, published in four volumes between 1835 and 1846, reads as a further and extended indictment of English rule. It was an enormous work (consulted by Karl Marx in his extensive notes on Irish history), but not a critical success. Moore acknowledged scholarly failings, some of which stemmed from his inability to read documentary sources in Irish. In The Nation, Thomas Davis, dismissed the effort as "cold, feeble and English", and a poor companion to Moore's biographies of Sheridan and of Fitzgerald, works that "belong to the Irish people".

== On Reform and Repeal ==
=== Parliamentary reform ===
In his journal, Moore confessed that he "agreed with the Tories in their opinion" as to the consequences of the first Parliamentary Reform Act (1832). He believed it would give "an opening and impulse to the revolutionary feeling now abroad" [England, Moore suggested, had been "in the stream of a revolution for some years"] and that the "temporary satisfaction" it might produce would be but as the calm before a storm: "a downward reform (as Dryden says) rolls on fast". But this was a prospect he embraced. In conversation with the Whig grandee Lord Lansdowne, he argued that while the consequences might be "disagreeable" for many of their friends, "We have now come to that point which all highly civilised countries reach when wealth and all the advantages that attend it are so unequally distributed that the whole is in an unnatural position: and nothing short of a general routing up can remedy the evil."

Despite their initially greater opposition to reform, Moore predicted that the Tories would prove themselves better equipped to ride out this "general routing". With the young Benjamin Disraeli (who was to be the author of the Second Reform Act in 1867) Moore agreed that since the Glorious Revolution first led them to court an alliance with the people against the aristocracy, the Tories had taken "a more democratic line". For Moore this was evidenced by the prime-ministerial careers of George Canning and Robert Peel: "mere commoners by birth could never have attained the same high station among the Whig party".

=== O'Connell and Repeal ===
In 1832, Moore declined a voter petition from Limerick to stand for the Westminster Parliament as a Repeal candidate. When Daniel O'Connell took this as evidence of Moore's "lukewarmness in the cause of Ireland", Moore recalled O'Connell's praise for the "treasonous truths" of his book on Fitzgerald. The difficulty, Moore suggested, was that these "truths" did not permit him to pretend with O'Connell that reversing the Acts of Union would amount to something less than real and lasting separation from Great Britain. Relations had been difficult enough after the old Irish Parliament had secured its legislative independence from London in 1782. But with a Catholic Parliament in Dublin, "which they would be sure to have out and out", the British government would be continually at odds, first over the disposal of Church of Ireland and absentee property, and then over what would be perennial issues of trade, foreign treaties and war.

So "hopeless appeared the fate of Ireland under English government, whether of Whigs or Tories", that Moore declared himself willing to "run the risk of Repeal, even with separation as its too certain consequence". But with Lord Edward Fitzgerald, Moore believed independence possible only in union with the "Dissenters" (the Presbyterians) of the north (and possibly then, again only with a prospect of French intervention). To make "headway against England" the "feeling" of Catholics and Dissenters had first to be "nationalised". This is something Moore thought might be achieved by fixing upon the immediate abuses of the (Anglican and landed) "Irish establishment". As he had O'Connell's uncompromising stance on the Veto, Moore regarded O'Connell's campaign for Repeal as unhelpful or, at best, "premature".

This perspective was shared by some of O'Connell's younger lieutenants, dissidents with the Repeal Association. Young Irelander Charles Gavan Duffy sought to build a "League of North and South" around what Michael Davitt (of the later Land League) described as "the programme of the Whiteboys and Ribbonmen reduced to moral and constitutional standards"—tenant rights and land reform.

== Irish Melodies ==
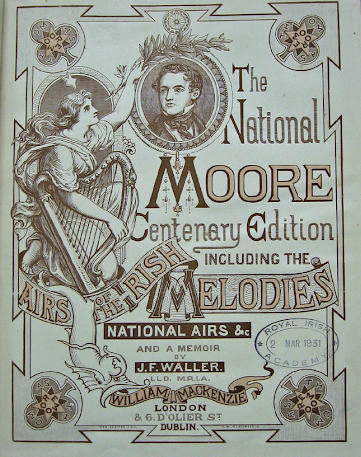
Moore's Melodies, Centenary Edition, 1880

In what has since been regarded as one of the chief cultural expressions of the linguistic transition in Ireland from Gaelic to English, from 1806 Moore began setting English lyrics to the tunes found in Edward Bunting's A General Collection of the Ancient Irish Music (1797). Such was their popularity that between 1808 and 1834 his Irish Melodies ran to ten volumes, with translations into German, Italian, Hungarian, Czech, and French, and settings by Ludwig van Beethoven and Hector Berlioz. In the United States, "The Last Rose of Summer" alone sold more than a million copies.

Moore was in no doubt that the Melodies would be "the only work of my pen […] whose fame (thanks to the sweet music in which it is embalmed) may boast a chance of prolonging its existence to a day much beyond our own". They distinguished him in his lifetime, as his country's national bard. It was an honour he sought to maintain by declining an offer from Dublin Castle to become Ireland's first poet laureate, a salaried position he believed could not but compromise the expression he gave to popular national sentiment.

Daniel O'Connell liberally employed Melodies in his last campaign for Repeal. In the greatest of his "monster meetings" at the Hill of Tara on the feast-day of the Assumption, 15 August 1843, O'Connell's carriage proceeded through a crowd, reportedly of a million, accompanied by a harpist playing Moore's "The Harp that once through Tara's Halls".

The Young Irelanders, who, like Moore, distanced themselves from O'Connell, found Moore's lyrical effusions less convincing. In what he described as the "whining lamentation over our eternal fall, and miserable appeals to our masters to regard us with pity", Thomas Davis detected a tone of national resignation and defeatism. A future generation of Irish writers took a similar view. Moore's tone, according to the poet Seamus Heaney, was found to be "too light, too conciliatory, too colonisé".

Recently, there has been a reappraisal more sympathetic "strategies of disguise, concealment and historical displacement so necessary for an Irish Catholic patriot who regularly sang songs to London glitterati about Irish suffering and English 'bigotry and misrule'". It notes that Moore's contemporaries among the subject people's of eastern and central Europe, had a keen appreciation of the Melodies political undertones. Polish intellectuals, in particular, recognised in the Gothic elements of the Melodies, as well as of Lalla Rookh (“a dramatization of Irish patriotism in an Eastern parable”) and Captain Rock, "a cloak of culture and fraternity".

== Lalla Rookh ==
Next to the Melodies, Lalla Rookh (1817) was Moore's greatest contemporary success. In a testimony to the literary reputation his Melodies had already established, Longmans, the publishers, agreed to largest advance, £3150, yet commanded by a book of verse.

Possibly the most translated epic verses of its time, the work was the basis for the operas Lalla-Rûkh (1821) by Gaspare Spontini, Lalla-Roukh by Félicien David (1862), Feramors by Anton Rubinstein (1863), and The Veiled Prophet by Charles Villiers Stanford (1879). One of the interpolated tales, Paradise and the Peri, was interpreted in a choral-orchestral work by Robert Schumann (1843).

Written with the encouragement of Byron, and drawing on The Garden of Knowledge by Inayatullah Kamboh (1608–1671), it is ostensibly a chivalric romance concerning the daughter of the 17th-century Mughal emperor Aurangzeb. But set against the backdrop of the enduring conflict between the Mughal throne and its Zoroastrian subjects — "a theme that had much to recommend it to an Irishman"—scholars read it as a political allegory. Hidden references are found to the French Revolution, to the United Irish Rebellion of 1798, and to Moore's martyred friend Robert Emmet.

== Byron's Memoirs ==
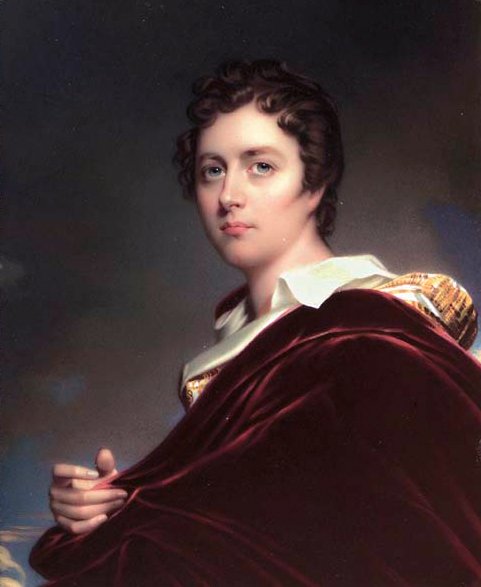
Byron: "When you read my Memoirs you will learn the evils of true dissipation."

Moore was much criticised by contemporaries for allowing himself to be persuaded, on the grounds of their indelicacy, to destroy Byron's Memoirs. Modern scholarship assigns the blame elsewhere.

In 1821, with Byron's blessing, Moore sold the manuscript, with which Byron had entrusted him three years before, to the publisher John Murray. Although he himself allowed that it contained some "very coarse things", when, following Byron's death in 1824, Moore learned that Murray had deemed the material unfit for publication he spoke of settling the matter with a duel. But the combination of Byron's wife Lady Byron, half-sister and executor Augusta Leigh and Moore's rival in Byron's friendship John Cam Hobhouse prevailed. In what some were to call the greatest literary crime in history, in Moore's presence the family solicitors tore up all extant copies of the manuscript and burned them in Murray's fireplace.

With the assistance of papers provided by Mary Shelley, Moore retrieved what he could. His Letters and Journals of Lord Byron: With Notices of His Life (1830) "contrived", in the view of Macaulay, "to exhibit so much of the character and opinions of his friend, with so little pain to the feelings of the living". Lady Byron still professed herself scandalised—as did The Times.

With Byron an inspiration, Moore previously published a collection of songs, Evenings in Greece (1826), and, set in 3rd-century Egypt, his only prose novel The Epicurean (1827). Supplying a demand for "semi-erotic romance tinged with religiosity" it was a popular success.

== 1844 photograph by Henry Fox Talbot ==
Moore stands centre in a photograph by William Henry Fox Talbot dated April 1844

Moore stands in the centre of a calotype dated April 1844.

Moore is pictured with members of the household of William Henry Fox Talbot, the photographer. Talbot, a pioneer of photography (the inventor of the salted paper and calotype processes) was Moore's neighbour in Wiltshire. It is possible that the lady to the lower right of Moore is his wife Bessy Moore.

To the left of Moore stands Henrietta Horatia Maria Fielding (1809–1851), a close friend of the Moores, Talbot's half-sister and the daughter of Rear-Admiral Charles Fielding.

Moore took an early interest in Talbot's photogenic drawings. Talbot, in turn, took images of Moore's hand-written poetry possibly for inclusion in facsimile in an edition of The Pencil of Nature, the first commercially published book to be illustrated with photographs.

== Death and receding reputation ==
In the late 1840s (and as the catastrophe of the Great Famine overtook Ireland), Moore's powers began to fail. He was reduced ultimately to senility, which came suddenly in December 1849. Moore died on 25 February 1852, in his seventy-third year, having outlived his wife, his five children and most of his friends and companions.

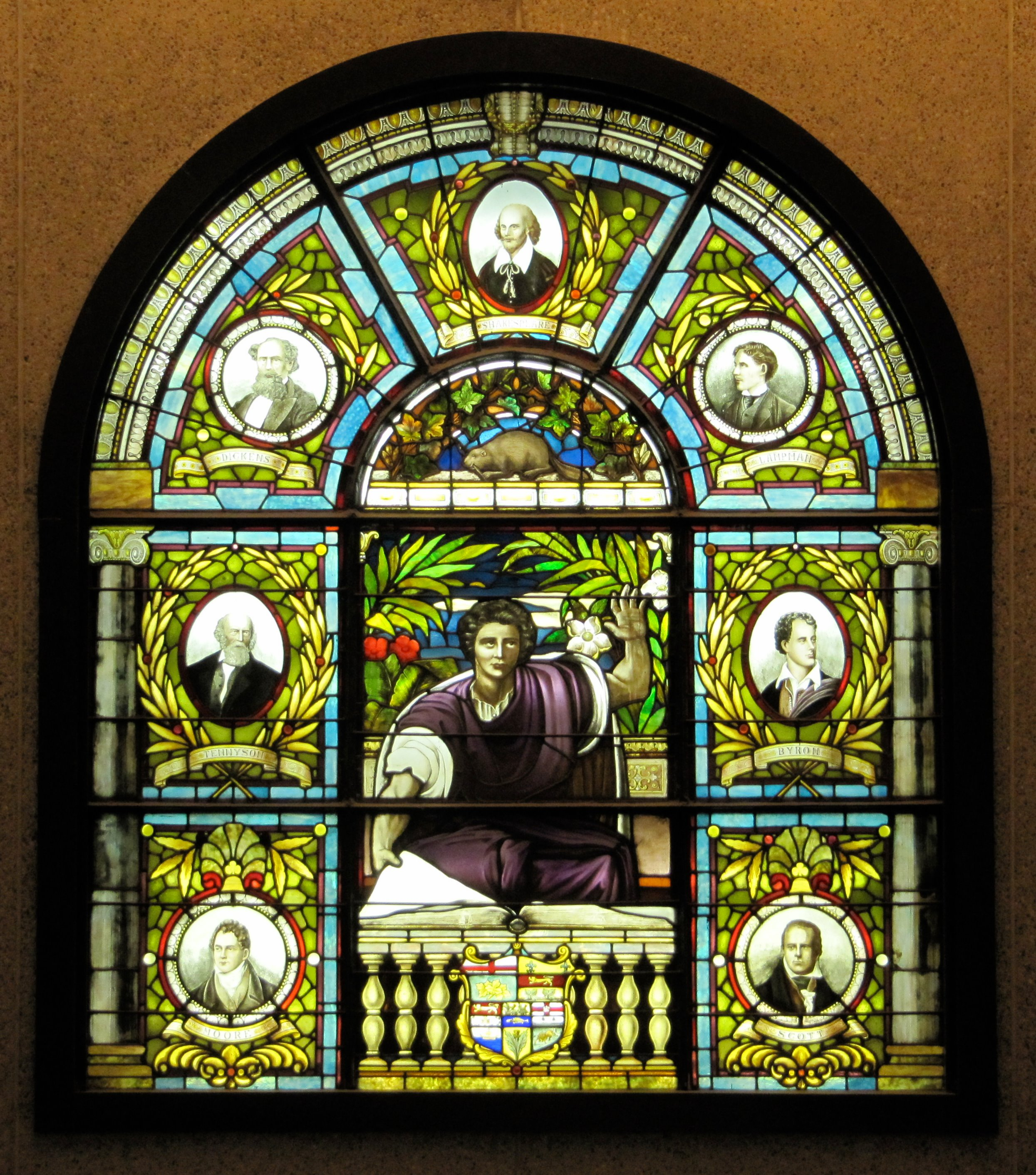
Window at Ottawa Public Library features Moore with Dickens, Archibald Lampman, Walter Scott, Byron, Tennyson, and Shakespeare

He was buried in Bromham churchyard within view of his cottage home, and beside his daughter Anastasia (who had died aged 17), near Devizes in Wiltshire.

His epitaph at his St. Nicholas churchyard grave is inscribed with his own verse:

Dear Harp of my Country! in darkness I found thee,

The cold chain of silence had hung o'er thee long,
When proudly, my own Island Harp, I unbound thee,

And gave all thy chords to light, freedom and song!

Moore had appointed as his literary executor, Lord John Russell, the Whig leader who, just four days before Moore's death, had ended his first term as Prime Minister. Russell dutifully published Moore's papers in accordance with his late friend's wishes. The Memoirs, Journal, and Correspondence of Thomas Moore appeared in eight volumes, published between 1853 and 1856. But, while popular editions of his Melodies and Airs continued for some time to appear, in post-famine Ireland Moore's literary stock "crashed".

Not only did the bathos and nostalgia of Moore's verse appear suspect, its intended piano-accompanied singing and recitation did not survive the developments in mass media: cheap print, the recorded voice, the moving image. As a form, the verse narrative was almost entirely abandoned. Describing his burial site in 1937, Moore's biographer Howard Mumford Jones wrote: "To the grave of a Catholic buried in a Protestant churchyard, of an Irishman at rest in Wiltshire, of the genius once thought to be immortal and now no longer read, almost no one comes".

Almost "totally forgotten, except in parish halls, or Hibernian evenings in Brooklyn or Melbourne", Moore was not the subject of a major biography until 2008, The Bard of Erin, The Life of Thomas Moore by Ronan Kelly.

== Commemoration ==
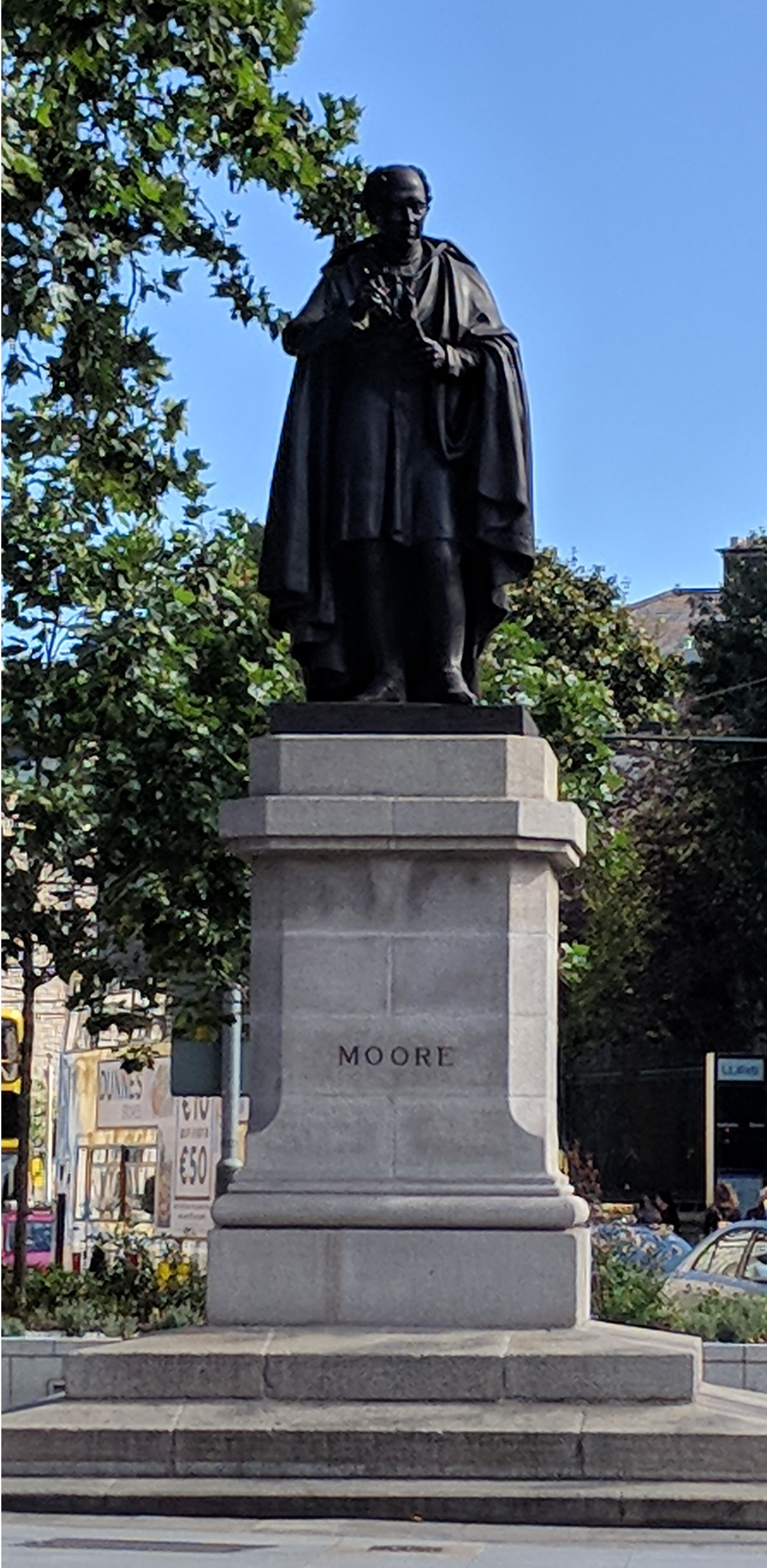
Statue of Moore in College Street, Dublin

Moore is commemorated in several places: by a plaque on the house where he was born, by busts at The Meetings and Central Park, New York, and by a bronze statue near Trinity College Dublin. There is a road in Walkinstown, Dublin, named Thomas Moore Road, in a series of roads named after famous composers, locally referred to as the Musical Roads. In addition to the window in the Ottawa Public Library, there is also a small window (along with windows to Robert Burns and Sir Walter Scott) beneath the big English literature stained glass window in the former Carnegie Public Library in Vancouver.

- Many composers have set the poems of Thomas Moore to music. They include Ludwig van Beethoven, Gaspare Spontini, Robert Schumann, Friedrich von Flotow, Felix Mendelssohn, Hector Berlioz, Charles Ives, William Bolcom, Benjamin Britten, and Henri Duparc.
- As noted above (Irish Melodies / Later criticism and reappraisal), many songs of Thomas Moore are cited in works of James Joyce, for example "Silent, O Moyle" in Two Gallants (Dubliners) or "The Last Rose of Summer".
- Irish American scholar, singer and critic James W. Flannery (born 1936) is widely recognized as a skilled interpreter of Thomas Moore's art songs. In 1997 he released a book and recording named Dear Harp of My Country: The Irish Melodies of Thomas Moore.
- Oliver Onions quotes Moore's poem "Oft in the Stilly Night" in his 1910 ghost story "The Cigarette Case". It is also referenced in Bob Shaw's 1966 science-fiction story "Light of Other Days".
- The earliest known photograph taken by a woman (Constance Fox Talbot) is an albeit somewhat unclear image of a few lines from one of his poems.
- Letitia Elizabeth Landon offers a tribute in her poem Thomas Moore, Esq.., in Fisher's Drawing Room Scrap Book, 1839.
- Edna O'Brien wrote a short story entitled "Oft in the Stilly Night" in her 1990 story collection Lantern Slides.

== In fiction ==
The character Tickle Tommy in John Paterson's Mare, James Hogg's allegorical satire on the Edinburgh publishing scene first appearing in the Newcastle Magazine in 1825, is based on Thomas Moore. Percy French wrote several parodic versions of Moore's melodies in a comic paper he edited for two years The Jarvey, including at least six versions of "The Minstrel Boy". He also parodied Moore in his stage shows. As noted above, Moore and his melodies also figure in the works of James Joyce: A Portrait of the Artist as a Young Man and Finnegans Wake.

== List of works ==
=== Prose ===
- A Letter to the Roman Catholics of Dublin (1810)
- Memoirs of Captain Rock (1824)
- Memoirs of the Life of Richard Brinsley Sheridan (2 vols) (1825)
- The Epicurean, a Tale (29 June 1827)
- Letters & Journals of Lord Byron, with Notices of his Life (2 vols.) (1830, 1831)
- The Life and Death of Lord Edward Fitzgerald (1831)
- Travels of an Irish Gentleman in Search of a Religion (2 vols.) (1833)
- The History of Ireland (vol. 1) (1835)
- The History of Ireland (vol. 2) (1837)
- The History of Ireland (vol. 3) (1840)
- The History of Ireland (vol. 4) (1846)
- Political and Historical Writings on Irish and British Affairs by Thomas Moore, Introduced by Brendan Clifford (1993).

=== Lyrics and verse ===
- Odes of Anacreon (1800)
- Poetical Works of the Late Thomas Little, Esq. (1801)
- The Gypsy Prince (a comic opera, collaboration with Michael Kelly, 1801)
- Epistles, Odes and Other Poems (1806)
- A Selection of Irish Melodies, 1 and 2 (April 1808)
- Corruption and Intolerance, Two Poems with Notes Addressed to an Englishman by an Irishman (1808)
- The Sceptic: A Philosophical Satire (1809)
- A Selection of Irish Melodies, 3 (Spring 1810)
- A Melologue upon National Music (1811)
- M.P., or The Blue Stocking, (a comic opera, collaboration with Charles Edward Horn, 1811)
- A Selection of Irish Melodies, 4 (November 1811)
- Parody of a Celebrated Letter (privately printed and circulated, February 1812, Examiner, 8 March 1812)
- Anacreontic to a Plumassier (Morning Chronicle, 16 March 1812)
- Extracts from the Diary of a Fashionable Politician (Morning Chronicle, 30 March 1812)
- The Insurrection of the Papers (Morning Chronicle, 23 April 1812)
- Lines on the Death of Mr. P[e]rc[e]v[a]l (May 1812)
- The Sale of the Tools (Morning Chronicle, 21 December 1812)
- Correspondence Between a Lady and a Gentleman (Morning Chronicle, 6 January 1813)
- Intercepted Letters, or the Two-Penny Post-Bag (March 1813)
- Reinforcements for Lord Wellington (Morning Chronicle, 27 August 1813)
- A Selection of Irish Melodies, 5 (December 1813)
- A Collection of the Vocal Music of Thomas Moore (1814)
- A Selection of Irish Melodies, 6 (1815, April or after)
- Sacred Songs, 1 (June 1816)
- Lines on the Death of Sheridan (Morning Chronicle, 5 August 1816)
- Lalla Rookh, an Oriental Romance (May 1817)
- The Fudge Family in Paris (verse novel, 1818)
- National Airs, 1 (23 April 1818)
- To the Ship in which Lord C[A]ST[LE]R[EA]GH Sailed for the Continent (Morning Chronicle, 22 September 1818)
- Lines on the Death of Joseph Atkinson, Esq. of Dublin (25 September 1818)
- Go, Brothers in Wisdom (Morning Chronicle, 18 August 1818)
- A Selection of Irish Melodies, 7 (1 October 1818)
- To Sir Hudson Lowe (Examiner, 4 October 1818)
- The Works of Thomas Moore (6 vols) (1819)
- Tom Crib's Memorial to Congress (March 1819)
- National Airs, 2 (1820)
- Irish Melodies, with a Melologue upon National Music (1820)
- A Selection of Irish Melodies, 8 (on or around 10 May 1821)
- Irish Melodies with an Appendix, containing the original advertisements and the prefatory letter on music (1821)
- National Airs, 3 (June 1822)
- National Airs, 4 (1822)
- The Loves of the Angels, a Poem (23 December 1822)
- The Loves of the Angels, an Eastern Romance (5th ed. of Loves of the Angels) (1823)
- Fables for the Holy Alliance, Rhymes on the Road, &c. &c. (7 May 1823)
- Sacred Songs, 2 (1824)
- A Selection of Irish Melodies, 9 (1 November 1824)
- National Airs, 5 (1826)
- Evenings in Greece (1826)
- A Dream of Turtle (The Times, 28 September 1826)
- A Set of Glees (circa 9 June 1827)
- National Airs, 6 (1827)
- Odes upon Cash, Corn, Catholics, and other Matters (October 1828)
- Legendary Ballads (1830)
- The Summer Fête. A Poem with Songs (December 1831)
- Irish Antiquities (The Times, 5 March 1832)
- From the Hon. Henry ---, to Lady Emma --- (The Times, 9 April 1832)
- To Caroline, Viscountess Valletort (The Metropolitan Magazine, June 1832)
- Ali's Bride... (The Metropolitan Magazine, August 1832)
- Verses to the Poet Crabbe's Inkstand (The Metropolitan Magazine, August 1832)
- Tory Pledges (The Times, 30 August 1832)
- Song to the Departing Spirit of Tithe (The Metropolitan Magazine, September 1832)
- The Duke is the Lad (The Times, 2 October 1832)
- St. Jerome on Earth, First Visit (The Times, 29 October 1832)
- St. Jerome on Earth, Second Visit (The Times, 12 November 1832)
- Evenings in Greece, 2 (December 1832)
- To the Rev. Charles Overton (The Times, 6 November 1833)
- Irish Melodies, 10 (with Supplement) (1834)
- Vocal Miscellany, 1 (1834)
- The Numbering of the Clergy (Examiner, 5 October 1834)
- The Fudge Family in England (verse novel,1835)
- Vocal Miscellany, 2 (1835)
- Irish Melodies (1835)
- The Song of the Box (Morning Chronicle, 19 February 1838)
- Sketch of the First Act of a New Romantic Drama (Morning Chronicle, 22 March 1838)
- Thoughts on Patrons, Puffs, and Other Matters (Bentley's Miscellany, 1839)
- Alciphron, a Poem (1839)
- The Poetical Works of Thomas Moore, collected by himself (10 vols) (1840–1841)
- Thoughts on Mischief (Morning Chronicle, 2 May 1840)
- Religion and Trade (Morning Chronicle, 1 June 1840)
- An Account of an Extraordinary Dream (Morning Chronicle, 15 June 1840)
- The Retreat of the Scorpion (Morning Chronicle, 16 July 1840)
- Musings, suggested by the Late Promotion of Mrs. Nethercoat (Morning Chronicle, 27 August 1840)
- The Triumphs of Farce (1840)
- Latest Accounts from Olympus (1840)
- The poetical works of Thomas Moore, complete in three volumes, Paris, Baudry's European Library (1841)
- A Threnody on the Approaching Demise of Old Mother Corn-Law (Morning Chronicle, 23 February 1842)
- Sayings and Doings of Ancient Nicholas (Morning Chronicle, 7 April 1842)
- More Sayings and Doings of Ancient Nicholas (Morning Chronicle, 12 May 1842)
- Prose and verse, humorous, satirical and sentimental, by Thomas Moore, with suppressed passages from the memoirs of Lord Byron, chiefly from the author's manuscript and all hitherto inedited and uncollected. With notes and introduction by Richard Herne Shepherd, (London: Chatto & Windus, Piccadilly, 1878).

== Bibliography ==
- Benatti, Francesca, and Justin Tonra. "English Bards and Unknown Reviewers: A Stylometric Analysis of Thomas Moore and the Christabel Review", in: Breac: A Digital Journal of Irish Studies 3 (2015). URL.
- Clifford, Brendan (ed.): Political and Historical Writings on Irish and British Affairs by Thomas Moore, (Belfast: Athol Books, 1993).
- Dowden, Wilfred S. (ed.): The Letters of Thomas Moore, 2 vols, (Oxford: Oxford University Press, 1964).
- Dowden, Wilfred S. (ed.): The Journal of Thomas Moore, 6 vols, (Newark: University of Delaware Press, 1983–91).
- Gunning, John P.: Moore. Poet and Patriot (Dublin: M.H. Gill and Son, 1900).
- Hunt, Una: Sources and Style in Moore's Irish Melodies (London: Routledge, 2017); ISBN 978-1-4094-0561-0 (hardback), ISBN 978-1-315-44300-3 (e-book).
- Jones, Howard Mumford: The Harp that Once: A Chronicle of the Life of Thomas Moore (New York: Henry Holt & Co., 1937).
- Kelly, Linda: Ireland's Minstrel: A Life of Tom Moore, Poet, Patriot and Byron's Friend (London: I.B. Tauris, 2006); ISBN 978-1-84511252-3
- Kelly, Ronan: Bard of Erin. The Life of Thomas Moore (Dublin: Penguin Ireland, 2008), ISBN 978-1-84488-143-7.
- McCleave, Sarah / Caraher, Brian (eds): Thomas Moore and Romantic Inspiration. Poetry, Music, and Politics (New York: Routledge, 2018); ISBN 978-1-138-28147-9 (hardback), ISBN 978-1-315-27113-2 (e-book).
- Ní Chinnéide, Veronica: "The Sources of Moore's Melodies", in: Journal of the Royal Society of Antiquaries of Ireland 89 (1959) 2, pp. 109–54.
- Strong, L. A. G.: The Minstrel Boy. A Portrait of Tom Moore (London: Hodder & Stoughton, & New York: A. Knopf, 1937).
- Tonra, Justin: "Masks of Refinement: Pseudonym, Paratext, and Authorship in the Early Poetry of Thomas Moore", in: European Romantic Review 25.5 (2014), pp. 551–73. doi:10.1080/10509585.2014.938231.
- Tonra, Justin: "Pagan Angels and a Moral Law: Byron and Moore's Blasphemous Publications", in: European Romantic Review 28.6 (2017), pp. 789–811. doi:10.1080/10509585.2017.1388797.
- Tonra, Justin: Write My Name: Authorship in the Poetry of Thomas Moore (New York; Abingdon: Routledge, 2020). doi:10.4324/9781003090960
- Vail, Jeffery W.: The Literary Relationship of Lord Byron and Thomas Moore (Baltimore: Johns Hopkins University Press, 2001).
- Vail, Jeffery W.: "Thomas Moore in Ireland and America: The Growth of a Poet's Mind", in: Romanticism 10.1 (2004), pp. 41–62.
- Vail, Jeffery W.: "Thomas Moore: After the Battle", in: Julia M. Wright (ed.), The Blackwell Companion to Irish Literature, 2 vols (New York: Wiley-Blackwell, 2010), vol. 1, pp. 310–25.
- Vail, Jeffery W. (ed.): The Unpublished Letters of Thomas Moore, 2 vols (London: Pickering and Chatto, 2013), ISBN 978-1-84893-074-2.
- Vail, Jeffery W.: "Thomas Moore", in: Gerald Dawe (ed.), The Cambridge Companion to Irish Poets (Cambridge: Cambridge University Press, 2017), pp. 61–73.
- White, Harry: The Keeper's Recital. Music and Cultural History in Ireland 1770–1970 (Cork: Cork University Press, 1998), ISBN 1-85918-171-6.
- White, Terence de Vere: Tom Moore: The Irish Poet (London: Hamish Hamilton, 1977).
