= List of Irish poets =

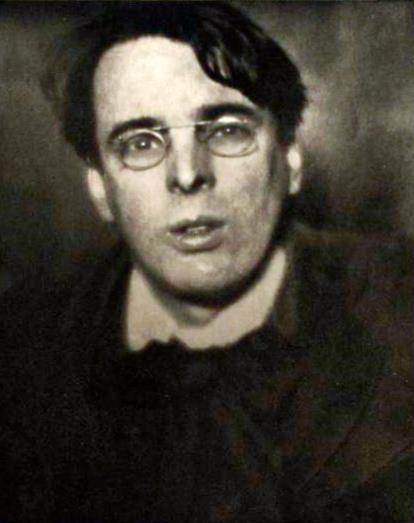
W. B. Yeats

This is a list of notable poets with Wikipedia pages, who were born or raised in Ireland or hold Irish citizenship.

Abbreviations for the languages of their writings: E: English; F: French; I: Irish (Gaeilge); L: Latin; R: Russian

== A–D ==
- Adomnán (d. 704, L)
- Æ (George William Russell) (1867–1935, E)
- William Allingham (1824–1889, E)
- Ivy Bannister (born 1951, E)
- Leland Bardwell (1922–2016, E)
- Beccán mac Luigdech (fl. c. 650, I)
- Samuel Beckett (1906–1989, E/F)
- Brendan Behan (1923–1964, E)
- Gerard Beirne (born 1962, E)
- Thomas Bibby (1799–1863, E)
- Blathmac mac Cú Brettan (fl. c. 750, I)
- Eavan Boland (1944–2020, E)
- Dermot Bolger (born 1959, E)
- Pat Boran (born 1963, E)
- Samuel Boyse (1709–1749, E)
- Oisín Breen (born 1985, E)
- Rory Brennan (born 1945, E)
- Frances Browne (1816–1887, E)
- George Brun (fl. late 18th century, I)
- Colette Bryce (born 1970, E)
- Catherine Byron (born 1947), E
- Michael Feeney Callan (born 1955, E)
- Moya Cannon (born 1956, E)
- Ciarán Carson (1948–2019, E)
- James Casey (1824–1909, E)
- Oengus Celi De (fl. c. 800, I)
- Patrick Chapman (born 1968, E)
- Austin Clarke (1896–1974, E)
- Brendan Cleary (born 1958, E)
- Brian Coffey (1905–1995, E)
- Colman ua Clasaigh (d. 661, I)
- Colmán mac Lénéni (d. 604, I)
- Padraic Colum (1881–1972, E)
- Susan Connolly (born 1956, E)
- Jim Craven (1935–1980, E)
- Cúán úa Lothcháin (d. 1024)
- Cuirithir of Connacht (fl. 7th century, I)
- Catherine Ann Cullen, E
- John Cunningham (1729–1773, E)
- Tony Curtis (born 1955, E)
- Guaire Dall (fl. 849, I)
- Pádraig J. Daly (born 1943, E)
- Ailbhe Darcy (born 1981, E)
- Thomas Davis (1814–1845, E)
- Michael Davitt (1950–2005, I)
- Cecil Day-Lewis (1904–1972, E)
- Patrick Deeley (born 1953, E)
- Celia de Fréine (born 1948, I/E)
- Greg Delanty (born 1958, E)
- Kate Dempsey (poet) (born 1958, E)
- Louis de Paor (born 1961, I)
- Denis Devlin (1908–1959, E)
- John Dillon (1816–1866, E)
- Theo Dorgan (born 1953, E)
- Charles Donnelly (poet) (1914 - 1937)
- Gerard Donovan (born 1959, E)
- Ellen Mary Patrick Downing (1828–1869, E)
- John Swanwick Drennan (1809–1893, E)
- William Drennan (1754–1820, E)
- Charles Gavan Duffy (1816–1903, E)
- Seán Dunne (1956–1995, E)
- Lord Dunsany (1878–1957, E)
- Paul Durcan (1944–2025, E)

== E–L ==
- John Ennis (born 1944, E)
- Martina Evans (born 1961, E)
- Peter Fallon (born 1951, E)
- Elaine Feeney (born 1979, E)
- Piaras Feiritéar (c. 1600–1653, I)
- Fothadh an Fili (fl. 879, I)
- Flann Mainistrech (d. 1056, I)
- Patrick Galvin (1927–2011, E)
- Monk Gibbon (1896–1987, E)
- Oliver St. John Gogarty (1878–1957, E)
- Oliver Goldsmith (c. 1730–1774, E)
- Mark Granier (born 1957, E)
- Eamon Grennan (born 1941, I)
- Gerald Griffin (1803–1840, E)
- Sarah Maria Griffin (c. 1988, E)
- Vona Groarke (born 1964, E)
- Stephen Gwynn (1864–1950, E)
- Kerry Hardie (born 1951, E)
- Anne Le Marquand Hartigan (1931–2022, E)
- Michael Hartnett (1944–1999, I/E)
- Randolph Healy (born 1956, E)
- Séamus Heaney (1939–2013, E)
- David Herbison (1800–1880, E)
- F. R. Higgins (1896–1941, E)
- Kevin Higgins (born 1967, E)
- Rita Ann Higgins (born 1955, E)
- Pearse Hutchinson (1927–2012, I/E)
- Douglas Hyde (1860–1949, I/E)
- Pat Ingoldsby (1942–2025, E)
- Valentin Iremonger (1918–1991, E)
- John Jordan (1930–1988, E)
- James Joyce (1882–1941, E)
- Trevor Joyce (born 1947, E)
- Patrick Kavanagh (1904–1967, E)
- Rita Kelly (born 1953, I)
- Charles Kickham (1828–1882, E)
- Thomas Kinsella (1928–2021, E)
- Anatoly Kudryavitsky (born 1954, R/E)
- Emily Lawless (1845–1913, E)
- Sarah Leech (1809–1820, E)
- Francis Ledwidge (1887–1917, E)
- C. S. Lewis (1899–1963, E)
- James Liddy (1934–2008, E)
- Eddie Linden (1935–2023, E)
- Loisin an Fili (fl. 868, I)
- Michael Longley (1939–2025, E)
- Luccreth moccu Chiara (fl. c. 600, I)

== M–P ==
- Aimirgein mac Amalgado (I)
- Anluan Mac Aodhagáin (I)
- Seán Mac Aoidh (fl. 1820)
- Micheál Mac Suibhne (c. 1760–1820, I)
- Denis Florence MacCarthy (1817–1868, E)
- Flannagan mac Ceallach (fl. 879, I)
- Dónal Meirgeach Mac Conmara (18th century)
- Cináedh mac Coscrach (d. 874, I)
- Art Mac Cumhaigh (1738–1773, I)
- Donagh MacDonagh (1912–1968, E)
- Thomas MacDonagh (1878–1916, E)
- Patrick MacDonogh (1902–1961, E)
- Athairne Mac Eoghain (I)
- Seán MacFalls (1957–2023, E)
- Patrick MacGill (1889–1960, E)
- Thomas MacGreevy (1893–1967, E)
- John Macken (c. 1784–1823, E)
- Louis MacNeice (1907–1963, E)
- Tomás Mac Síomóin (1938–2022, I)
- Marie MacSweeney (living, E)
- Neil McBride (1861–1942, I)
- Hugh McFadden (born 1942, E)
- Medbh McGuckian (born 1950, E)
- Nigel McLoughlin (born 1968, E)
- Bernard McNulty (1842–1892, E)
- Máire Mhac an tSaoi (1922–2021, I)
- Maenghal the Pilgrim (fl. 844, I)
- Derek Mahon (1941–2020, E)
- James Clarence Mangan (1803–1849, E)
- Caitlín Maude (1941–1982, I)
- Máighréad Medbh (born 1959, E)
- John Mee (born 1965, E)
- Paula Meehan (born 1955, E)
- Brian Merriman (1747–1805, I)
- Alice Milligan (1865–1953, E)
- Moling of Luachair (fl. 695, I)
- Dorothy Molloy (1942–2004, E)
- John Montague (1929–2016, E)
- Thomas Moore (1779–1852, E)
- Paul Muldoon (born 1951, E)
- Hayden Murphy (born 1945, E)
- Christine Murray, 21st century
- Kate Newmann (born 1965, E)
- Eibhlín Dubh Ní Chonaill (c. 1743 – c. 1800, I)
- Nuala Ní Chonchúir (born 1970, E)
- Eiléan Ní Chuilleanáin (born 1942, E)
- Annemarie Ní Churreáin (born 1981)
- Nuala Ní Dhomhnaill (born 1952, I)
- Ciara Ní É (E,I)
- Ailbhe Ní Ghearbhuigh (born 1984, I)
- Áine Ní Ghlinn (born 1955, I)
- Doireann Ní Ghríofa (born 1981, I/E)
- Charlotte Nooth (19th century, I)
- Dáibhí Ó Bruadair (David O Bruadair) (1625–1698, I)
- Máirtín Ó Direáin (1910–1988, I)
- John Francis O'Donnell (1837–1874, E)
- Mary O'Donnell (born 1954, E)
- Bernard O'Donoghue (born 1945, E)
- Gregory O'Donoghue (1951–2005, E)
- Dennis O'Driscoll (1954–2012, E)
- Pádraig Ó hÉigeartaigh (1871–1936, I)
- Cinaed Ó hArtucain (d. 975, I)
- John O'Higgin (d. 1490, I)
- Nessa O'Mahony (living, E)
- Ó Maoilciaran an Fili (fl. c. 1395, I)
- Henrietta O'Neill (1758–1793, E)
- Liam Ó Muirthile (1950-2018)
- Seán na Ráithíneach Ó Murchadha (1700-1762, I)
- Mary Devenport O'Neill (1879–1967, E)
- Paidin mac Lochlainn Ó Mailchonaire (d.1506)
- Antoine Ó Raifteirí (Anthony Raftery) (1784–1835, I)
- Aogán Ó Rathaille (1675–1729, I)
- Seán Ó Ríordáin (1916–1977, I)
- Cathal Ó Searcaigh (born 1956, I)
- Micheal O'Siadhail (born 1947, I/E)
- Eoghan Rua Ó Súilleabháin/Owen Roe O'Sullivan (1748–1782, I)
- Seumas O'Sullivan (1879–1958, E)
- Eoghan Ó Tuairisc (Eugene Watters) (1919–1982, I/E)
- Frank Ormsby (born 1947, E)
- Tom Paulin (born 1949, E)
- Patrick Pearse (Pádraig Anraí Mac Piarais) (1879–1916, I/E)
- Joseph Plunkett (1887–1916, E)
- Joseph Richard Enright : Seosamh Rísteárd Mac Ionnrachtaigh (born 1958, I)

== Q–Z ==
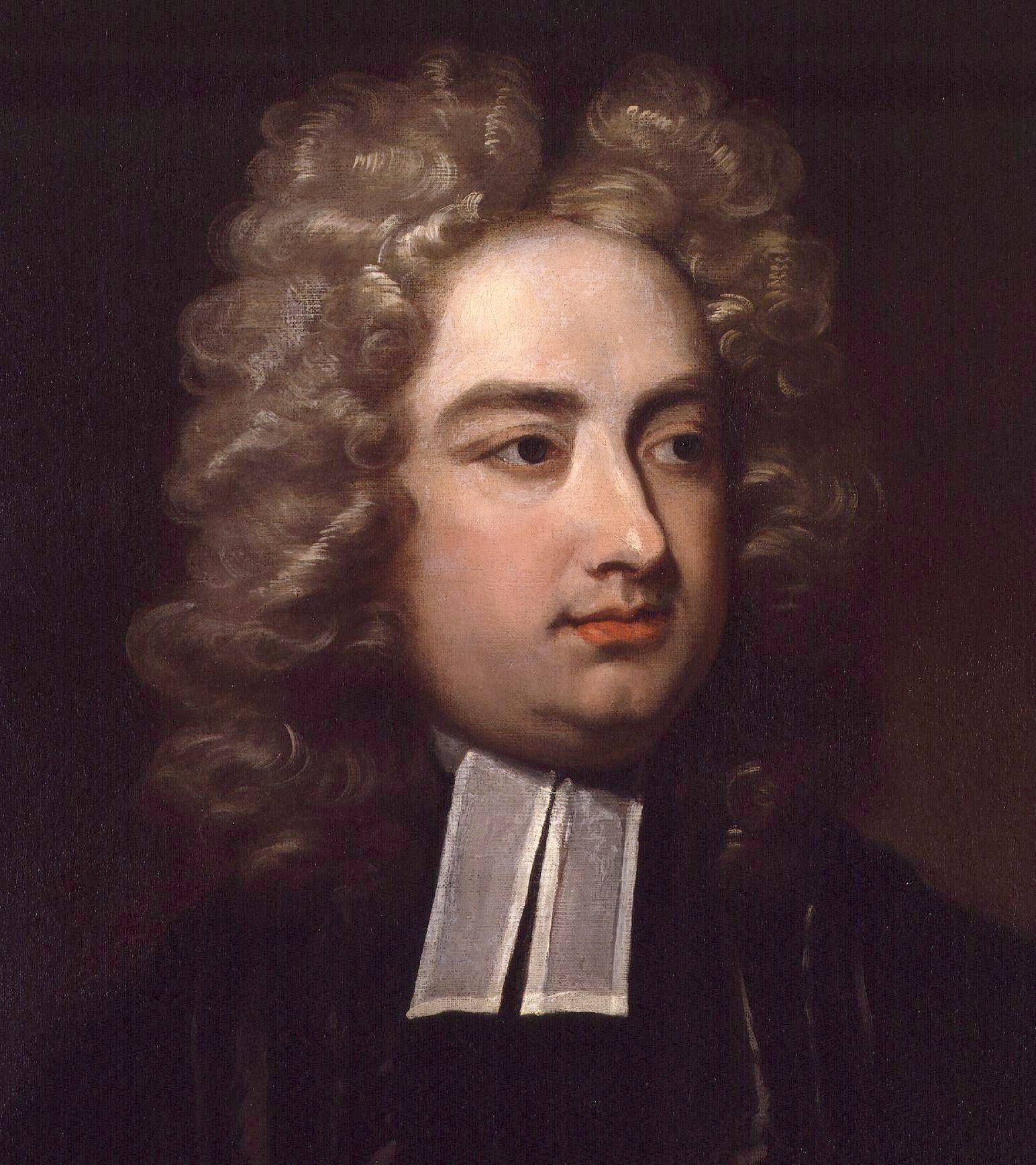
Jonathan Swift

- George Reavey (1907–1976, E)
- Rechtgal úa Síadail (c. 800, I)
- Nell Regan (born 1969, E)
- Maurice Riordan (born 1953, E)
- Lennox Robinson (1886–1958, E)
- Gabriel Rosenstock (1949–2026, I/E)
- Rosemarie Rowley (born 1942, E)
- Adam Rudden (born 1983, E)
- Blanaid Salkeld (1880–1959, E)
- Maurice Scully (1952–2023, E)
- John W. Sexton (born 1958, E)
- Eileen Shanahan (1901–1979, E)
- James Simmons (1933–2001, E)
- Peter Sirr (born 1960, E)
- Michael Smith (1942–2014, E)
- Cherry Smyth (born 1960, E)
- Geoffrey Squires (born 1942, E)
- James Stephens (1880–1950, E)
- Eithne Strong (1925–1999, I/E)
- Matthew Sweeney (1952–2018, E)
- Jonathan Swift (1667–1745, E)
- John Millington Synge (1871–1909, E)
- Senchán Torpéist (fl. c. 580 – c. 650, I)
- Eliza Dorothea Cobbe, Lady Tuite (c. 1764–1850, E)
- Katharine Tynan (1861–1931, E)
- Muiredhach na Tengadh Ua Sléibhín (d.1022) I
- Esther Vanhomrigh (1688–1723, I)
- Catherine Walsh (born 1964, E)
- David Wheatley (born 1970, E)
- Jane Wilde (1821–1896, E)
- Oscar Wilde (1854–1900, E)
- Richard D'Alton Williams (1822–1862, E)
- James Wills (1790–1868, E)
- Florence Mary Wilson, (1870–1946, E)
- Sheila Wingfield (1906–1992, E)
- Macdara Woods (1942–2008, E)
- Joseph Woods (born 1966, E)
- W. B. Yeats (1865–1939, E)
- Augustus Young (born 1943, E)

== See also ==
- Irish poetry
- Irish literature
- List of Irish dramatists
- List of Irish historians
- List of Irish novelists
- List of Irish short story writers
- List of Scottish poets, including those in Gaelic.
