= List of people from Dundalk =

This article provides a non-exhaustive list of notable people born, educated, or prominent in Dundalk, Ireland. The lists are in alphabetical order by surname.

== Arts and Media ==
- Molly Barton (1861–1949), artist.
- Dave Callan, comedian based in Melbourne, Australia.
- Paul Vincent Carroll (1900–1968), playwright.
- Zoë Conway, violinist, trained in both classical music and traditional fiddle-playing.
- The Corrs, Celtic folk rock family band: Jim, Sharon, Caroline, and Andrea Corr
- Nigel Cox, figurative artist.
- Jim Craven (1935–1980), Irish poet
- Maria Doyle-Cuche, singer who represented Ireland in the 1985 Eurovision Song Contest, finishing 6th.
- The Flaws, indie rock band.
- Catherine Gaskin (1929–2009), romance novelist.
- David Keenan, musician.
- Nuala Kennedy, composer, singer, songwriter, and multi-instrumentalist.
- Jinx Lennon, musician.
- Tómas Mac Anna (1924–2011), Tony Award-winning theatre director and playwright.
- Donald Macardle (1900–1984), actor, screenwriter, and director.
- Dorothy Macardle (1889–1958), revolutionary, author and playwright.
- Cathy Maguire, singer-songwriter.
- Dawn Martin, singer who represented Ireland in the 1998 Eurovision concert, finishing 9th.
- Patrick McDonnell, actor in Naked Camera and Father Ted.
- John Moore, film director, producer, and writer.
- Just Mustard, music group.
- Dónal O'Connor, multi-instrumentalist, producer and television presenter.
- Gerry O'Connor, traditional Irish fiddle player, and founding member of bands, Skylark and La Lúgh.
- The Mary Wallopers, Irish folk group
- Brendan O'Dowda (1925–2002), Irish tenor who popularised the songs of Percy French.
- Peadar Ó Dubhda (1881–1971), Patriot, musician, politician, musician, and author of the first translation the Bible into Irish.
- Liam Reilly (1955–2021), singer who represented Ireland in the 1990 Eurovision Song Contest, finishing 2nd; singer in the group Bagatelle.
- Megan Walsh, singer who joined the singing group Celtic Woman in 2018.

== Academia and Science ==
- Nicholas Callan (1799–1864), scientist who made the first induction coil.
- Steven Collins, Adjunct Associate Professor of Computer Graphics in the Department of Computer Science in Trinity College Dublin.
- Thomas Coulter (1793–1843), botanist and doctor.
- Eamon Duffy, professor of the history of Christianity at the University of Cambridge, and a Fellow and former president of Magdalene College.
- Richard FitzRalph (c. 1300–1360), Vice-Chancellor of the University of Oxford; Archbishop of Armagh from 1346 to 1360; his remains are interred at St Nicholas's Church.
- Fred Halliday, (1946–2010) writer and academic.
- John Phillip Holland (1841–1914), inventor of the submarine, worked as a teacher in Colaiste Ris, Dundalk.
- Peter Kerley (1900–1979), radiologist known for describing Kerley lines of heart failure.
- Brian MacCraith, physicist and the third president of Dublin City University (DCU).
- John Benjamin Macneill (1793–1880), civil engineer associated with Thomas Telford. His most notable projects were railway schemes in Ireland.
- Danny O'Hare, the first president of Dublin City University.
- Peter Rice (1935–1992), engineer, worked on the Sydney Opera House, Louvre Pyramid and Centre Pompidou.
- Thomas Maurice Rice, theoretical physicist specializing in condensed matter physics.
- Laurie Winkless, physicist and science writer.

== Politics ==
- Gerry Adams, Sinn Féin Teachta Dála (TD) for the Louth constituency since 2011.
- Dermot Ahern, former Fianna Fáil TD and government minister.
- Philip Callan (1837–1902), Liberal MP for Dundalk.
- James Coburn (1889–1953), National League Party (TD) for Louth.
- Pádraig Faulkner (1918–2012), Fianna Fáil TD and minister who served as Ceann Comhairle of Dáil Éireann.
- Edward Haughey (1944–2014), entrepreneur and politician.
- Tim Healy (1855–1931), anti-Parnellite MP for North Louth and later first Governor-General Irish Free State.
- Brendan McGahon (1936–2017), Fine Gael Teachta Dála (TD) for the Louth constituency from 1982 to 2002.
- John McGahon, Fine Gael Senator since 2020.
- Joseph Nolan (1846–1928), Irish Parliamentary Party, MP for North Louth.
- Daniel O'Connell Jnr (1816–1897), youngest son of Daniel O'Connell, The Liberator. O'Connell Jnr was MP for the constituency of Dundalk from 1846 to 1847.
- John J. O'Kelly (1872–1957), first (and last) Sinn Féin MP for North Louth.
- Ruairí Ó Murchú, TD for Louth constituency since 2020.
- William O'Reilly (1792–1844), was MP for the constituency of Dundalk from 1832 to 1835.

== Religion, historical, and legend ==
- Cú Chulainn
- Bertram de Verdun (died 1192), founder of the Norman settlement of Dundalk.
- Saint Brigit of Kildare (453–524).
- Richard FitzRalph (1300–1360), Archbishop of Armagh during the 14th century.
- Thomas Fortescue (1683–1769), sat in the Irish House of Commons for Dundalk from 1727 to 1760.
- James Hamilton, 1st Earl of Clanbrassil (1694–1758), member of the Irish House of Commons for Dundalk between 1715 and 1719. His father, also James, purchased the lands at Dundalk from Mark Trevor, 3rd Viscount Dungannon.
- Robert Jocelyn, 1st Earl of Roden (1731–1797), inherited most of the lands at Dundalk on marrying Lady Anne Hamilton (1730–1803), daughter of James Hamilton, 1st Earl of Clanbrassill.
- Columba Murphy (1806–1848), founder of the Roman Catholic mission in the Gambier Islands.
- Joseph Anthony Murphy (1857–1939), Vicar Apostolic for the Catholic mission in British Honduras (Belize), Central America.
- Marcus Trevor, 1st Viscount Dungannon (1618–1670), granted much of the land at Dundalk by King Charles II of England.

== Sport ==
- Niall Breen, racing driver.
- Amy Broadhurst, amateur boxer.
- Tommy Byrne, former Formula 1 racing driver.
- Jimmy Hasty (1936–1974), Dundalk F.C. footballer who was murdered during the Troubles.
- Sonia Hoey (1979–2024), Dundalk City LFC footballer and Womens FAI Cup winner in 2005.
- David Kearney, rugby player.
- Rob Kearney, rugby player.
- Frank Lynch (Gaelic footballer).
- Pete McArdle (1929–1985), long-distance runner who became a U.S. citizen, taking a gold medal for the United States at the 1963 Pan American Games in São Paulo, Brazil.
- Tom McCormick, (1890–1916), professional welterweight boxer, who won the World Welterweight Title.
- Eve McCrystal, former Irish para-cyclist who competed in tandem events for Ireland, as a sighted pilot for blind cyclists.
- Tadgh McElroy, rugby player.
- Jim McQuillan, Irish international darts player.
- Kyle Moran, football player.
- Grace Murray, football player.
- Kate O'Connor, athlete (gold medal winner in the pentathlon at the 2026 Commonwealth Games).
- Israel Olatunde, sprinter
- Emmanuel Osadebe, football player.
- Tom Sharkey (1873–1953), heavyweight boxer.
- Steve Staunton, former football player and former Republic of Ireland national football team manager.
- Tommy Traynor (1933–2006), former footballer, Republic of Ireland national football team and Southampton FC left-back.

== Military ==
- George Martin Lees (1898–1955), British soldier, geologist and leading authority on the geology of the Middle East.
- Francis Leopold McClintock (1819–1907), Royal Navy Rear Admiral, Arctic explorer, discoverer of the fate of Franklin.
- Lisa Smith (soldier), a former Irish soldier who converted to Islam and later travelled to Syria during the Syrian Civil War to join Islamic State of Iraq and the Levant (ISIS).
- Anthony Coningham Sterling (1805–1871), British Army officer and historian, author of The Highland Brigade in the Crimea.

== Business ==
- Phil Flynn, trade unionist, industrial relations consultant, government advisor, and financier.
- Larry Goodman, entrepreneur in the beef industry. #22 on the Irish Independent Rich List 2017.
- Pearse Lyons (1944–2018), entrepreneur; founder of Kentucky-based Alltech Inc.; number 5 on the Irish Independent Rich List 2017.
- Sir Thomas Callan Macardle (1856–1925), brewer who owned the Macardle Moore Brewery.
- Martin Naughton, entrepreneur founded GlenDimplex. #11 on the Irish Independent Rich List 2017.
- Brendan Ogle, trade union official.
- John Swift (1896–1990), trade union leader.

== Other ==
- Agnes Burns (1762–1834), sister of the poet Robert Burns lived at Stephenstown with her husband William Galt between 1817 and 1834.
- Sheila Hodgers (1957–1983), died of cancer after being denied treatments while pregnant, because the Catholic ethos of the hospital did not wish to harm the foetus.
- Katherine Plunket (1820–1932), the oldest person ever to be born and die in Ireland, at 111 years and 327 days.
