= Brian O'Rourke (composer) =

Irish singer and lecturer (1949–2022)

- Born: 1949
- Died: 2022 (aged 72–73)
- Occupation: Composer

Brían O'Rourke (1949-2022) was a composer and singer of Irish folk songs. He lectured in Irish Studies at Galway-Mayo Institute of Technology and authored several books on Irish folk songs.

== Life ==
O'Rourke was born in Ratheniska, County Laois. He was married and had three children, with whom he lived in Magherabaun, Feakle. O'Rourke taught Irish Studies or Irish Heritage at Galway-Mayo Institute of Technology.

== Works ==
O'Rourke published two volumes with collections of Irish songs. These songs were frequently performed by Sean nós singers.

- Blas Meala (english: A sip from the honeypot)
- An Dhub ina Bhan (english: Pale rainbow)

As a composer, he was best known for "The Bhodrán song" (when I grow up), included on the album The Very Best of Irish Ballads (ARC Music 2015) and Chantal du Champignon.

In the book chapter "County Mayo in Gaelic Folk Song", O´Rourke identifies a series of characters in the history of County Mayo that are remembered through folk songs.

- Seán Mac Aoidh, murder suspect and ascribed author of the poem Sail Og Rua
- Dónal Ó Maoláine, rapparee described in an adventure song
- Lacky Ó Máille, the troubled friar and author of two songs
- Tomás Bán Mac Aodhagáin, a person sentenced to be hanged who is described in the song that bears his name
- Dónal Meirgeach Mac Conmara, the freckled adscribed author of the song An Ghaoth Andeas
