= Guaire =

Guaire may refer to:

- Gorey, a town in Ireland
  - Gorey (barony), based on the Irish town
- Guaire River, Venezuela, flows through Caracas

== People ==
- Guaire Aidne mac Colmáin (died 663), king of Connacht, Ireland
- Guaire Dall (fl. 849), Irish poet

== See also ==
- Tromdámh Guaire, a satire from 14th or 15th century Ireland
