= Winkless =

Winkless is a surname. Notable people with the surname include:

- Brock Winkless (1959–2015), American puppeteer and visual effects technician
- Jeff Winkless (1941–2006), American film actor, voice actor and music composer
- Laurie Winkless, physicist and science writer
- Terence H. Winkless, producer, director, actor and writer of motion pictures and television
