= List of people known as the Pilgrim =

"The Pilgrim" is an epithet associated with pilgrimage to the Holy Land:

- Bernard the Pilgrim (fl. 854), Frankish monk who wrote a travelogue
- Daniel the Traveller (fl. 12th century?), also known as Daniel the Pilgrim, first travel writer from the Kievan Rus
- Maenghal the Pilgrim (fl. 844), Irish poet
- Nicholas the Pilgrim (1075–1094), Roman Catholic saint
- Richard the Pilgrim (died 720), father of three West Saxon saints

== See also ==
- List of people known as the Traveller
