= John O'Brien (bishop) =

Bishop and lexicographer from Ireland

Bishop John O'Brien (1701–1769) was an Irish bishop of the Roman Catholic Diocese Cork and Cloyne. He was also appointed as the vicar general of Cork, Cloyne and Ross. He is best remembered as the author of one of the earliest Irish-English dictionaries.

== Early career ==
Like most Irish Catholic priests in the eighteenth century, O'Brien travelled to Europe to study due to the Penal Laws restricting the training of priests in Ireland. Irish Colleges had been set up to educate Roman Catholics from Ireland in their own religion following the Tudor conquest of Ireland. In 1725, O'Brien entered the Irish seminary at Toulouse. After his ordination, he went to Paris for further study in 1731. He graduated as a bachelor of divinity at Toulouse in 1733 and worked as a tutor in Spain until returning to Ireland in 1738.

Three of his sermons, written in Irish between 1739 and 1740 (on Mortal sin, on the Gospel, and on The Passion) survive today and are in the Royal Irish Academy.

Upon his return he was concerned that the practice of educating Irish Catholic priests on the continent meant that they were disconnected from the Irish language and that this could limit their capacity for pastoral work, especially compared to the Church of Ireland which had translated the New Testament and The Book of Common Prayer into Irish in the 17th century.

== Focalóir Gaoidhilge-Sax Bhéarla ==
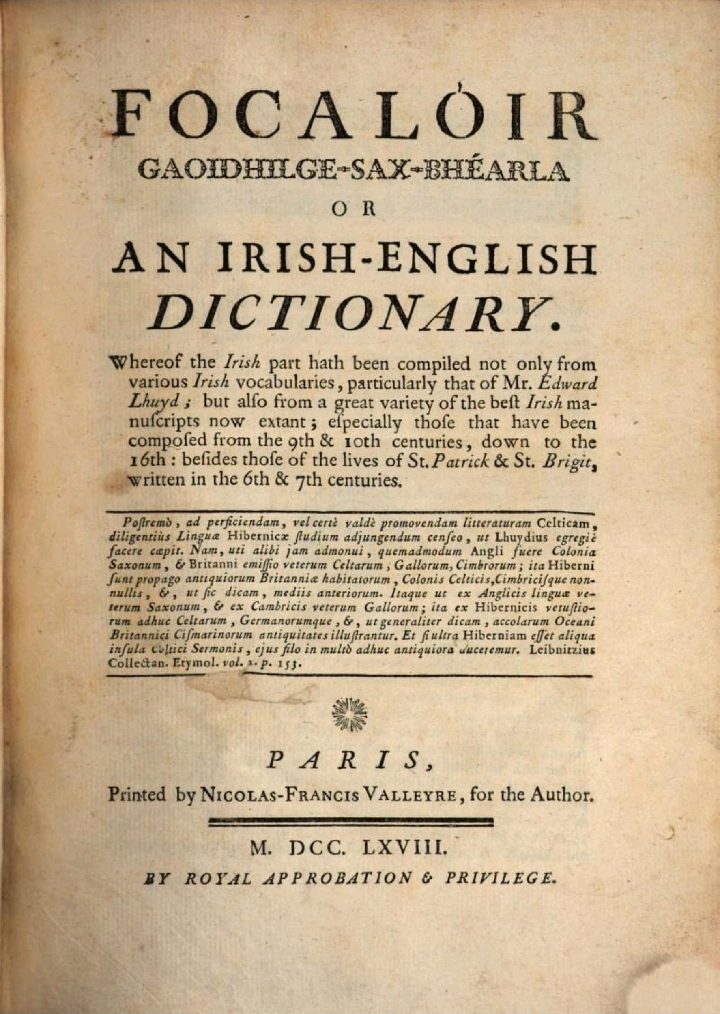
Frontpage of Bishop John O'Brien's Irish-English Dictionary

O'Brien appealed to the Pope for financial assistance in compiling the dictionary. He argued the dictionary was needed for the preservation of Catholicism in Ireland, primarily for the use of young priests beginning their work there. This appeal was unsuccessful, but Cardinal Joseph Maria Castelli, the prefect of Propaganda, made a personal donation. By 1762 O'Brien had completed an Irish–English dictionary that drew heavily on Edward Lhuyd's dictionary of 1707 but incorporated many additional terms collected from manuscript sources.

Focalóir Gaoidhilge-Sax-Bharla or "The Irish-English Dictionary" was published in France in 1768.

Focalóir Gaoidhilge-Sax-Bhéarla or an Irish-English Dictionary was used by famed writer, Goethe, to translate pieces of James MacPherson’s Ossian from Scots-Gaelic (Gàidhlig) into his native German language. The reception of Ossian in Europe

While the Focalóir uses obsolete spellings and has been superseded as a reference text, it was an important source for future dictionaries. In Dinneen's dictionary, O'Brien is cited as a source in over thirty entries.

=== Entries In O'Brien's Dictionary ===
The Focalóir Gaoidhilge-Sax Bhéarla contains words which have fallen out of use, have been omitted from modern dictionaries, or which have definitions which appear quaint to modern readers.

Word	Definition in Focalóir Gaoidhilge-Sax Bhéarla
Gall	according to the modern acceptation of the word, signifies an Englishman; as sean-ghaill the old English, or Strongbonians. The Danes or any other foreigners are in Irish writings called Gaill, but the true meaning of the word is Galli, the Gauls, those from ancient Gaul, now called France.
Sramh	a jet of milk gushing forth from a cow's udder
Dolbh	sorcery
Ba'rdamhail	Addicted to satires or lampoons
Gamal	a fool or stupid person, is the same in Letters & sound with the Hebrew Gamal, which means camel, the most stupid of all beasts

== Work as a Bishop ==
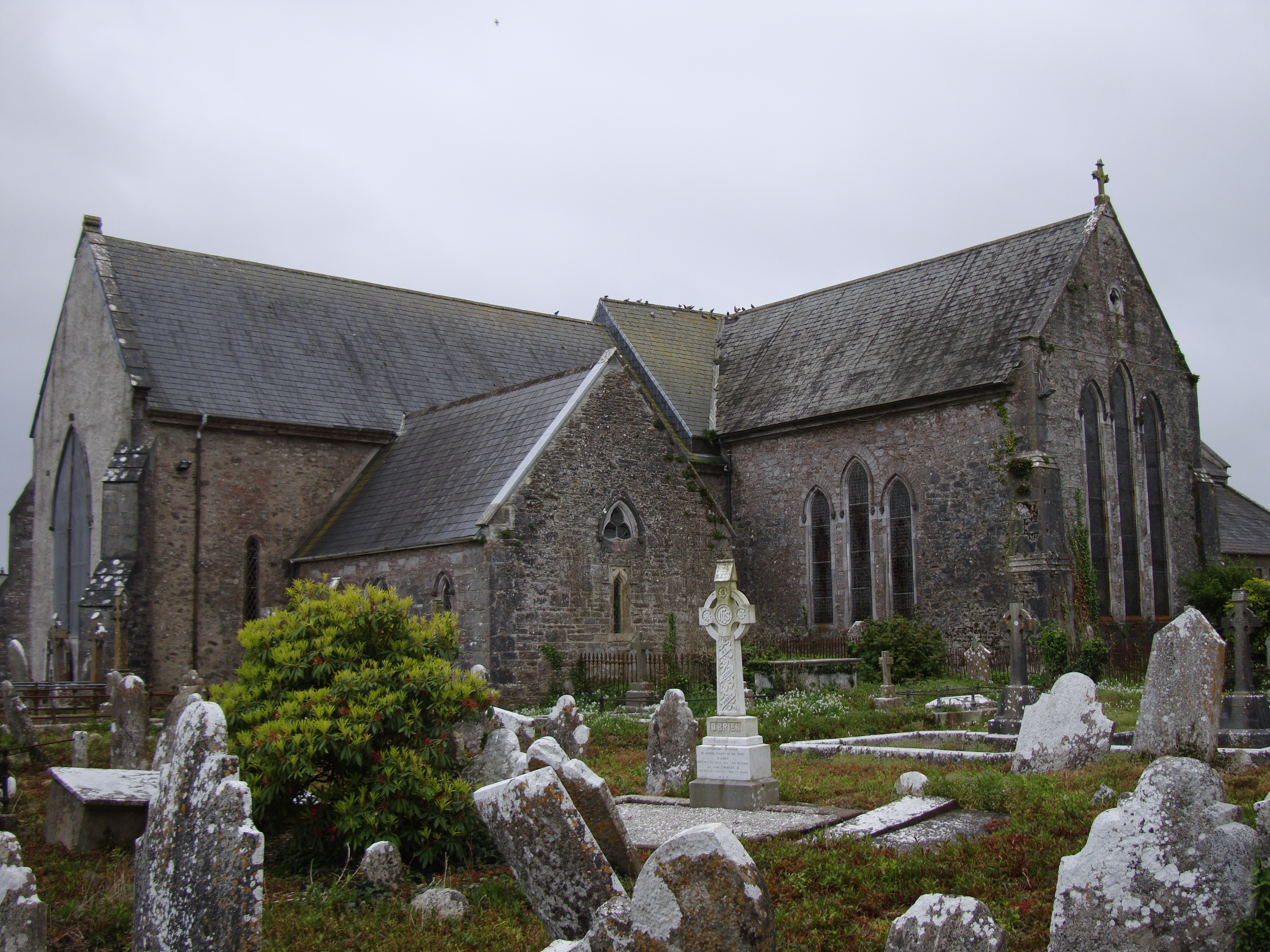
Cloyne Cathedral

Upon O'Brien's elevation to bishop, the poet Seán na Ráithíneach Ó Murchadha composed celebratory verse and was rewarded with a gold coin. Before long, O'Brien acquired a reputation as a disciplinarian and reformer. A book of regulations for the clergy of his diocese published in 1756 was notable for the emphasis it placed on catechesis, its determined opposition to clandestine marriages, and the large number of sins that were reserved for episcopal absolution.

In August 1758 O'Brien placed Mitchelstown and the surrounding area under interdict when a dispute concerning a local clerical appointment turned violent, an action that prompted Baron Kingston to issue a warrant for the bishop's arrest in 1758, offering a reward of £20".

In March 1762 O'Brien excommunicated those who were involved in the Whiteboys – which he characterised as a "dangerous contagion" in a pastoral letter.
