= Royal Northern Hospital =

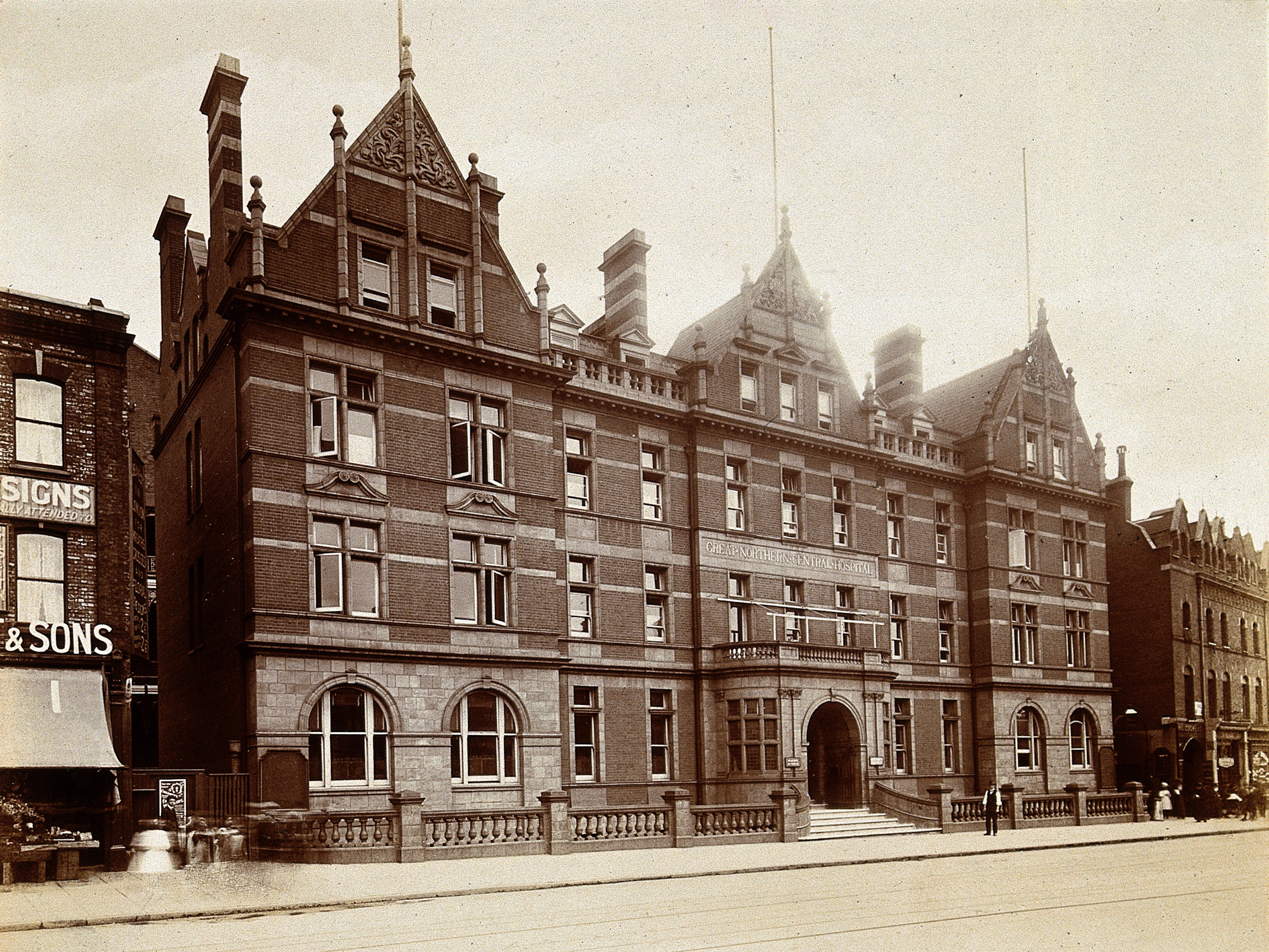
- Royal Northern Hospital

- Location within Islington

Geography
- Location: Holloway Road, London, England, United Kingdom
- Coordinates: 51.5608°N 0.1230°W

Organisation
- Care system: NHS England

History
- Founded: 1888

Links
- Lists: Hospitals in England

The Royal Northern Hospital was a general hospital on Holloway Road, London N7, near Tollington Way. It had inpatient, outpatient, accident and emergency facilities and was also a centre for postgraduate medical education and nurse education.

== History ==
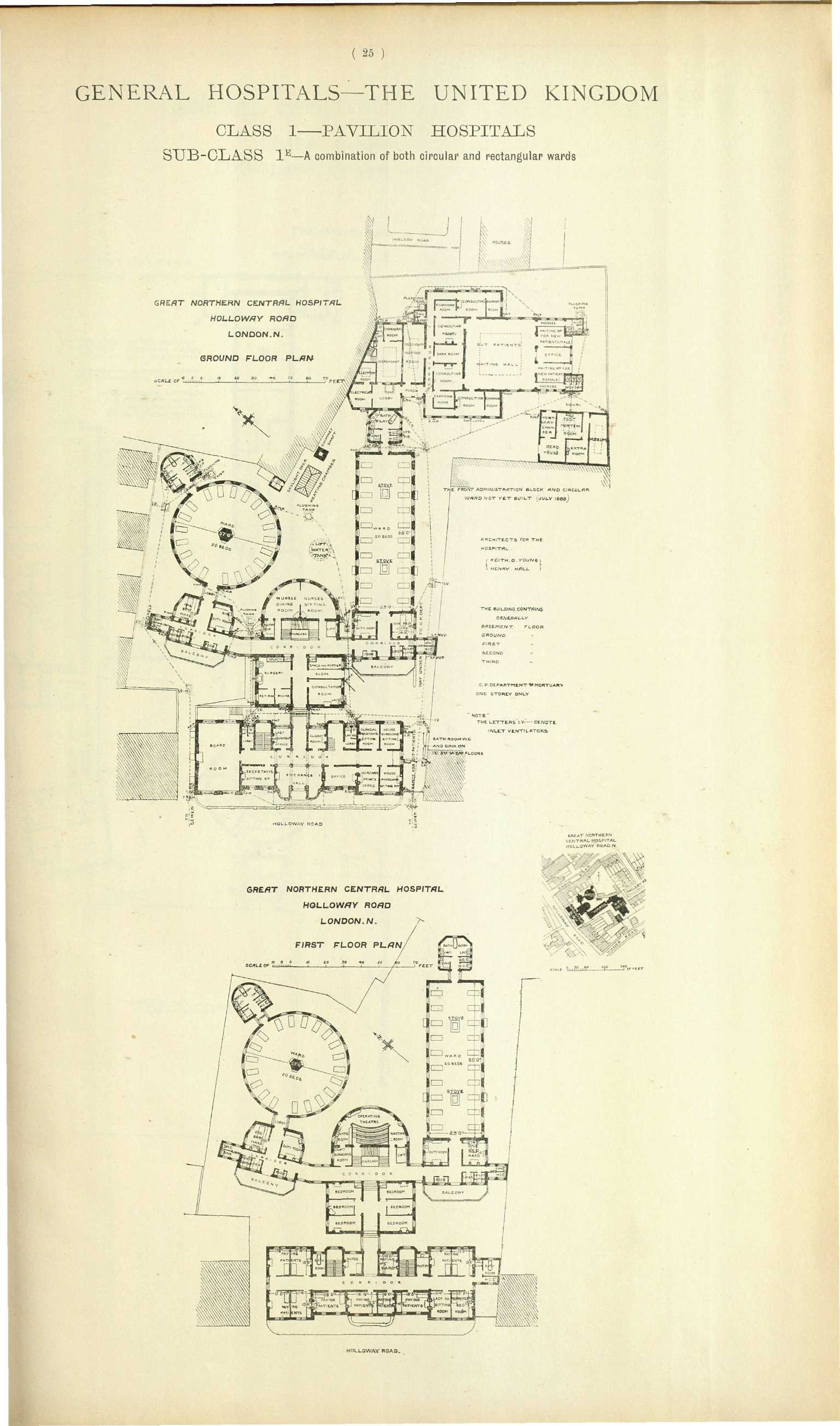
Floor plan in 1893

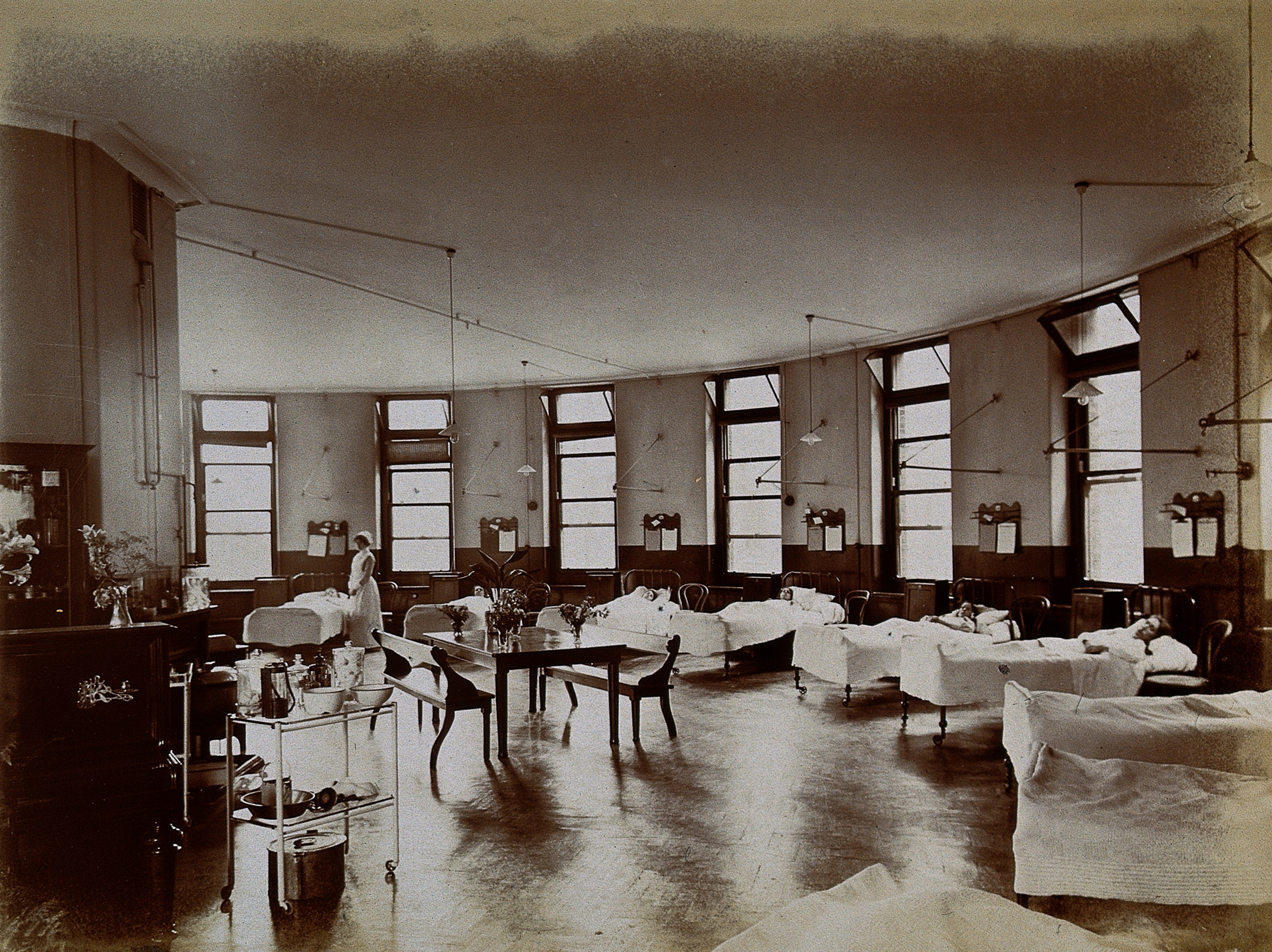
A ward in 1912

The hospital was founded as an independent and voluntary hospital by Dr. Sherard Freeman Statham, a surgeon, at York Way near King's Cross in 1856. It merged with the Spinal Hospital at Portland Road in 1862 but demerged again when it moved to Holloway Road as the Great Northern Central Hospital in 1888. The new buildings were designed by the architects Young and Hall. It became the Great Northern Hospital in 1911.

During World War One, the Great Northern Hospital was one of the first in London to receive wounded soldiers, and by 1916 had treated over 1,000. In 1917, Matron A M Bird received the Royal Red Cross (first class) for nursing services during the war. The hospital received a royal charter on amalgamation with the Royal Chest Hospital in 1921. The casualty department was built using public subscription, the Islington War Memorial Fund and designed with a memorial arch listing the 1337 people of Islington who had died in the First World War. The foundations to the new casualty department was laid by Lady Patricia Ramsay in July 1923, and the new building was opened by the Prince of Wales on 27 November 1923. A purpose built nurses' home, designed by Henry Adams, was opened in 1924 by Princess Louise Duchess of Argyll.

In 1929, the construction of a three-storey addition called St. David's wing started thanks to a donation received by the hospitals largest benefactor: Sir Howell J. Williams. It was completed in 1933 and contained 55 single rooms and 5 double rooms. Over his lifetime, Williams donated £158,000 to the hospital. A plaque recognizing Williams' contribution to the St. David's Wing is noted on a plaque at the site that was once the hospital.

The hospital joined the National Health Service in 1948. Following the reorganisation of the NHS facilities in North London whereby services were transferred to the Royal Free Hospital, University College Hospital and the Whittington Hospital, the hospital closed in 1992.

The hospital was demolished in the mid-1990s to make way to a block of flats; the demolition was delayed when a body was found. The body was later confirmed as Michelle Folan, who disappeared in 1981. Her husband, Patrick Folan, was convicted of her murder in 2001.

== Royal Northern Gardens ==
The Royal Northern Gardens are located on the site of the former casualty department of the Royal Northern Hospital.

A memorial wall of plaques has been installed in the gardens to commemorate the history of the site and some of the individuals involved with its creation.

== Notable staff ==
- Lancelot Barrington-Ward KCVO, FRCS, FRCSEd (4 July 1884 – 17 November 1953);surgeon, later senior surgeon at the Royal Northern Hospital 1914-1952; Surgeon to the household of King George VI and Extra Surgeon to the household of Queen Elizabeth II
- Robert Seymour Bridges OM (23 October 1844 – 21 April 1930) physician 1876-1885, poet laureate 1913-1930
- Kathleen "Kitty" C. Clark co-founded the radiography department and wrote a standard text.
- Cecil Willett Cunnington (1878–1961), physician and historian on costume and fashion
- Phillis Emily Cunnington (1887–1974), physician and historian on costume and fashion
- Raymond Greene (17 April 1901 – 6 December 1982), consulting physician (and brother of Graham Greene)

== See also ==
- List of hospitals in England
