= Anne Le Marquand Hartigan =

Irish poet, painter and playwright

- Born: 1931
- Died: 2022 (aged 90–91)
- Education: Reading University
- Occupations: Poet, playwright, painter
- Website: annehartigan.ie

Anne Le Marquand Hartigan (1931–2022) was an Irish poet, playwright, and painter.

== Personal life ==
Hartigan trained as a painter at Reading University, England. She returned to Co. Louth, Ireland, in 1962 with her husband Tim Hartigan where they farmed and reared their six children. She lived in Dublin. Her estate was valued by probate at €11.3 million.

== Career ==
Hartigan published seven collections of poetry: Unsweet Dreams (Salmon Poetry, 2011), To Keep The Light Burning: Reflections in Times of Loss (Salmon Poetry, 2008); Nourishment (Salmon Poetry, 2005); Immortal Sins (Salmon Poetry, 1993); the award-winning long poem with Anne's drawings, Now is a Moveable Feast (Salmon Poetry, 1991); Return Single (Beaver Row Press, 1986); Long Tongue (Beaver Row Press, 1982).

Hartigan's theatre piece Beds was first performed at the Damer Theatre in 1982 as part of the Dublin Theatre Festival. Hartigan's full length tragi-comedy I do like to be beside the seaside is set in an old peoples home. Hartigan won the Mobil Prize for Playwriting for her play The Secret Game (Chiswick books, 2014) in 1995. In Other Worlds (2003) was commissioned and performed by Ohio University, USA, then performed at the Edinburgh Festival Fringe and in New Zealand. Jersey Lilies was performed at the Samuel Beckett Theatre, Dublin 1996, where Hartigan acted and directed with Robert Gordon. La Corbiere (Carysfort Press, 2001) was performed at the Project Theatre as part of the Dublin Theatre Festival in 1989 and has since been performed in Beirut, Lebanon in 2004 and by Solas Nua Theatre Company in Washington DC, 2006.

Hartigan's prose work includes Clearing The Space: A Why of Writing (Salmon, 1996).
