= Kathleen Clark (radiographer) =

British radiographer (1896–1968)

Kitty Clark
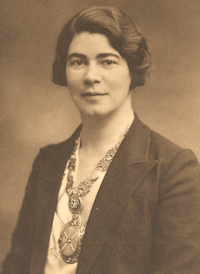
- Born: 1896
- Died: 20 October 1968 (aged 70)
- Education: Guy's Hospital
- Occupations: Radiographer and teacher
- Known for: Clark's Positioning in Radiography

Kathleen "Kitty" Clara Clark MBE (1896 – 20 October 1968) was a British radiographer who wrote the standard text now called Clark's Positioning in Radiography. She was one of the first qualified radiographers and established the teaching of radiography at the Royal Northern Hospital.

== Life ==
Clark was one of the first qualified radiographers in the UK. The first edition was published in 1939. She qualified in 1921/22 at Guy's Hospital. She was one of the first students to qualify for membership to the Society of Radiographers. The society had only been set up in 1920 and all the members up to that point had joined without examination.

She spent some years in Margate but she came back to London to lead a radiography department at the Royal Northern Hospital. In the following year, she created a teaching course at the hospital where she would establish her career.

She wrote the standard text "Positioning in Radiography" which was published in 1939. The 13th edition of the book now called "Clark's Positioning in Radiography" was published in 2015 with six co-authors. It is described as " the preeminent text on positioning technique for diagnostic radiographers." The book was intended to create common approaches and it established standards for projections in radiography departments. The book was attractive and the artist Francis Bacon used the book in creating his paintings.

She co-wrote "Mass Miniature Radiography of Civilians: For the Detection of Pulmonary Tuberculosis (guide to Administration and Technique with a Mobile Apparatus Using 35-mm. Film: and Results of a Survey)" with Philip D'Arcy and Peter Kerley. This was published in 1945.

== Death and legacy ==
Clark died on 20 October 1968, after four years of hospitalisation at the age of 70. Her book on positioning is still a standard text and her slides are also preserved.
