= List of people known as the Traveller =

"The Traveller" may refer to several people:

== People ==
- Bengt Bengtsson Oxenstierna (1591–1643), Swedish diplomat sometimes called Resare-Bengt ("Bengt the Traveller")
- Daniel the Traveller (fl. 12th century?), first travel writer from the Kievan Rus
- Pausanias (geographer), 2nd century travel writer

== In Norse mythology ==
- Eric the Taveller, subject of the saga Eireks saga víðförla
- Ratatoskr (Tusk the Traveller, according to scholar Guðbrandur Vigfússon), a squirrel who carries messages up and down the world tree Yggdrasil

== See also ==
- Ingvar the Far-Travelled, 11th century Swedish Viking who led an expedition that fought in Georgia
- List of people known as the Pilgrim
