= Rechtgal úa Síadail =

Gaelic-Irish poet

Rechtgal ua Siadail was a Gaelic-Irish poet who flourished in the late 8th and early 9th centuries.

== Biography ==
Though unmentioned in the extant Irish annals, "Rechtgal ua Siadail ... was highly regarded and fragments of his poetry are cited no less than seven times in various poetical and other learned compilations of the Middle Irish period."

His appellation, ua Siadail, "is undoubtedly at such an early period to be taken as a patronymic rather than as [a] surname."

Surviving fragments known to have been composed by Rechtgal are:

- Donnchad dia-n-fich domun diagthech, a poem on King Donnchad Midi of Tara (reigned 770–797)
- Muirgius muir tar bruinne Banba, on King Muirgius mac Tommaltaig of Connacht (reigned 792–815)
- Badbri cuicid Herend uile, concerningin an unidentified king of Ulaid
- Mad nodleana (na) crecht for talmuin, an obscure quatrain on Rignach, an otherwise unknown queen of Loch Lein
- Slicht a da gai tria cach mualach, cited in Cormac's Glossary

Summarizing, Donncha O hAodha states:

It is evident that Rechtgal was highly regarded in the schools and that his poems were remembered in them, even if his work was not always cited with approbation. It is clear too from the few surviving fragments of his poetry that he composed praise-poems for some of the most powerful kings of his own time, and indeed these fragments seem also to furnish testimony in regard to the freedom of movement which we know to have been allowed by poets in a unique fashion.
