= George Brun =

Irish poet, 18th century

George Brun, a.k.a. George Brown, Irish poet, fl. late 18th century.

Brun was a native of Dun na Geige or Brownstown, near Hollymount, in County Mayo. One of his few surviving songs or poems, Mairead Nic Shuibhne, is over one hundred verses long and concerns a woman he loves due to being married to someone else. In the course of the song, the woman tries to save him from depression by pretending that she never loved him.
