= Bernard McNulty =

American writer

Bernard McNulty (also known as Bernard Nulty) (1842–1892) was an Irish-American literary figure and U.S.-based Irish nationalist.

McNulty wrote for the New York Celtic Monthly and founded the first branch of the Irish nationalist Fenian in New York. He also wrote the Irish nationalist poem, The Patriot Chief.

McNulty's 1880 volume of bound verse The Patriot Chief and Other Poems, which was originally published by the Celtic Monthly Publishing Company while McNulty was resident in Newark, N.J., U.S.A. and which O'Donoghue notes "was well praised by some critics", is still in print. The Patriot Chief and Other Poems is housed in major historical collections on two continents, including at Harvard College, Brown University, the National Library of Ireland, the New York Historical Society Library, the New York Public Library, the Buffalo and Erie Public Library and has been digitized.
