= Peter Kerley =

Irish doctor

Peter Kerley KCVO CBE MD FRCP FRCR
- Born: 27 October 1900
- Died: 14 May 1979 (aged 78)
- Education: Trinity College Dublin
- Occupation: Radiologist
- Known for: Diagnosing lung cancer in King George VI; Radiological signs in heart failure, Kerley lines
- Notable work: A Textbook of X-ray Diagnosis by British Authors
- Spouse: Olivia MacNamee 1929
- Children: 2

Sir Peter James Kerley KCVO CBE (27 October 1900 – 14 May 1979) was an Irish radiologist famous for his role in the lung surgery of King George VI and the naming of the radiological sign in heart failure, Kerley lines.

Kerley had his initial radiological training in Vienna at a time when it was the new science. On his return, he completed his studies in Cambridge and took up a post in Westminster Hospital. Here, he worked closely with Sir Clement Price Thomas and also edited a major radiology textbook.

Following his early return from India and Singapore during World War II, Kerley continued his work in radiology of the heart and lungs and became radiology advisor to the Ministry of Health.

Throughout his working career, he received numerous awards, honours and directorships, going on to achieve royal recognition and worldwide acclaim.

== Early life ==
Born in 1900 in Dundalk, a town between Belfast and Dublin, Peter James Kerley was second-youngest of 14 children. His father was a low income grocer and could not afford Kerley's education. However, his uncle, Augustine Henry, a talented arboriculturalist, took charge over this.

== Medical career ==
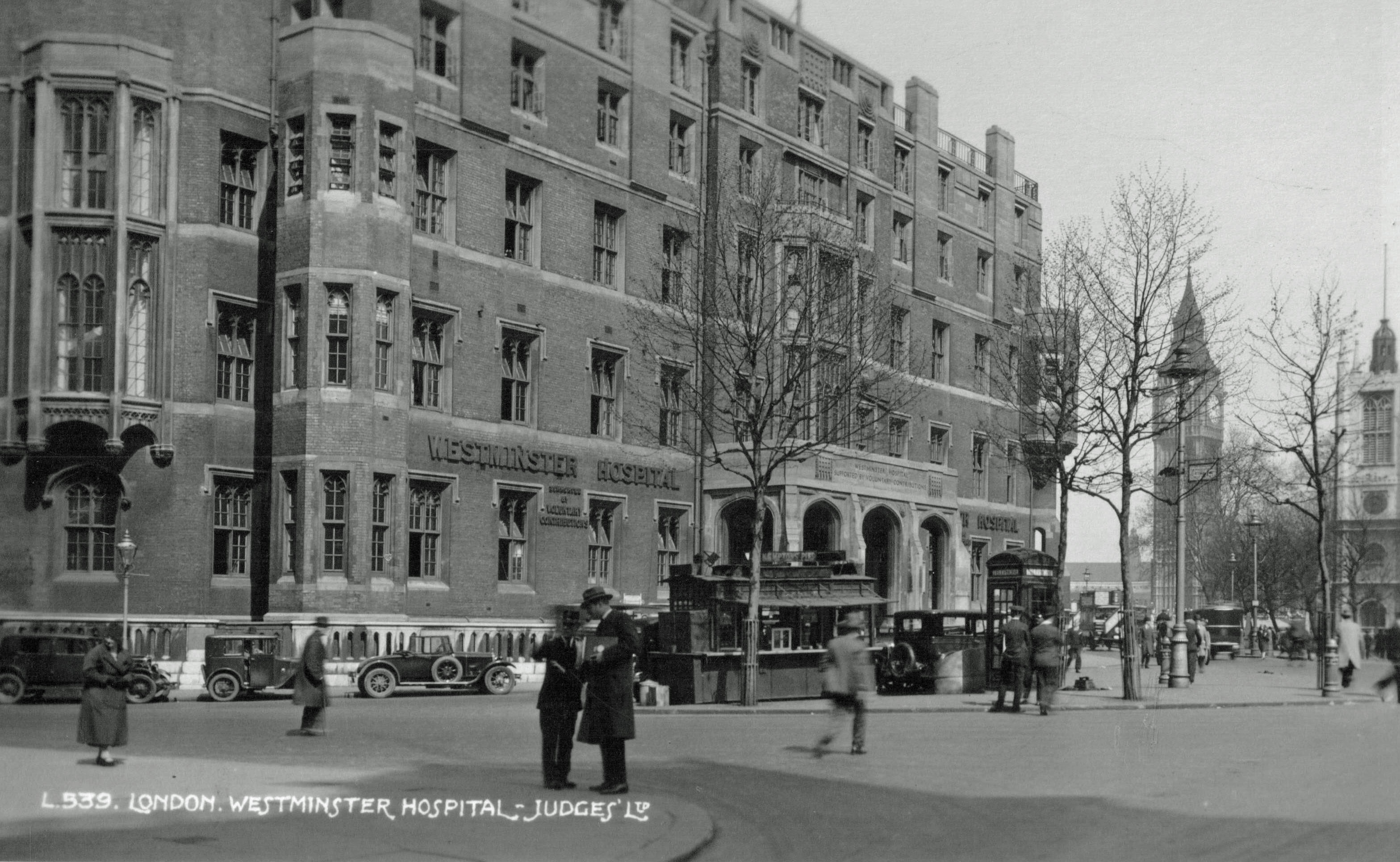
Westminster Hospital 1920s

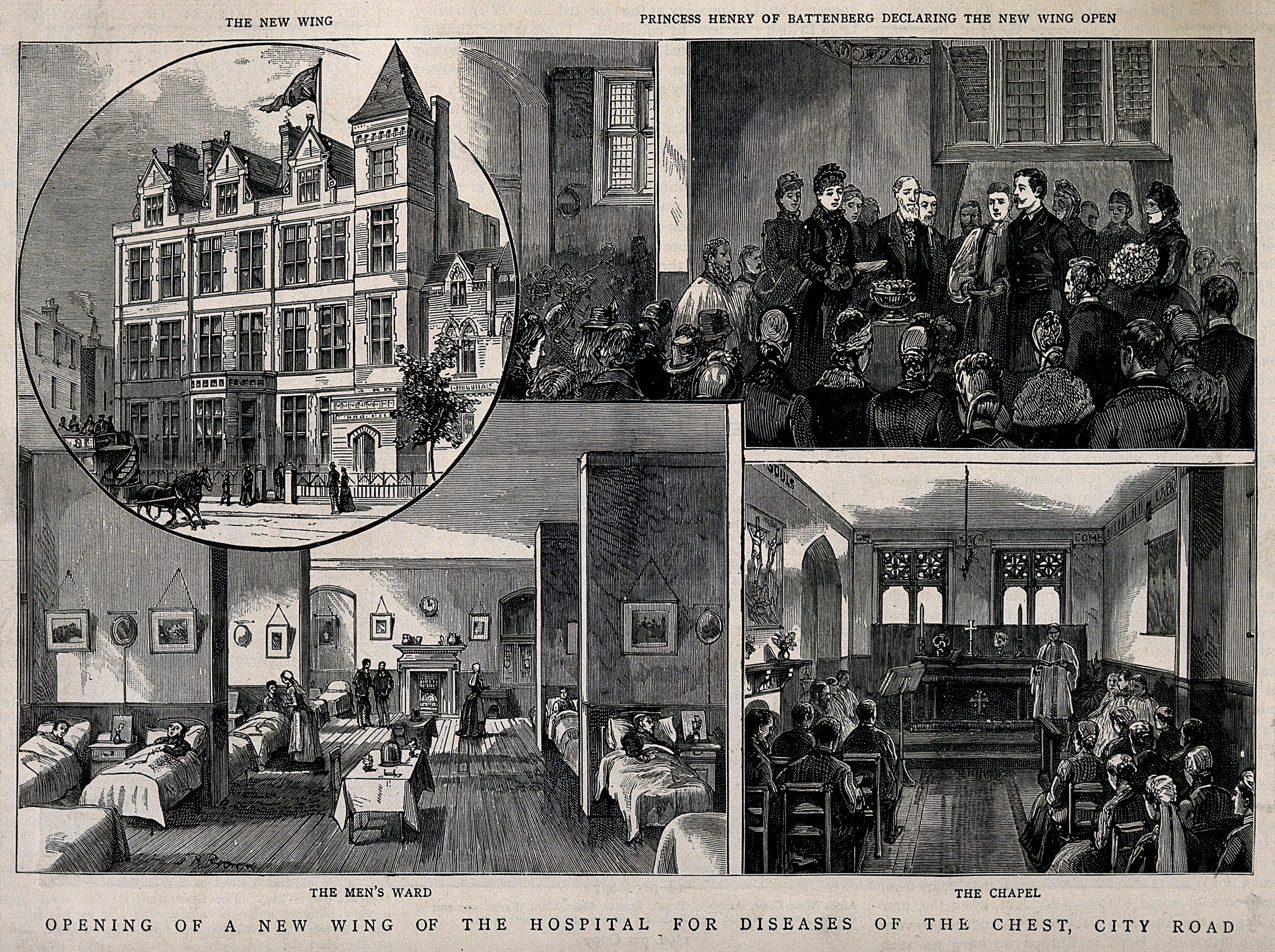
Royal chest hospital

A graduate of University College Dublin (1923), Kerley spent a year training in radiology in Vienna. His interest in radiology of the heart and lungs stemmed from this new specialty which was still somewhat novel and Vienna at this time was its epicenter.

Then travelling to the UK, he achieved the D.M.R.E from Cambridge University and obtained his M.D. from the University of Ireland in 1932.

Kerley assisted Seymour Cochrane Shanks to edit a major radiology textbook, 'A Textbook of X-ray Diagnosis by British Authors' in 1939. The first two editions of Recent Advances in Radiology was another later book, Kerley had spent time to organise.

He became director of radiology at the Westminster Hospital in 1939 and also became affiliated with the Royal Chest Hospital, London. At the time, Clement Price Thomas was an eminent thoracic surgeon. Kerley and Price Thomas formed a close connection which continued through their careers, influencing and molding Kerley's career pathway significantly.

Kerley wrote numerous articles including his celebrated St Cyres lecture, the ‘Radiology of the Pulmonary Circulation’ and also edited the Journal of the Faculty of Radiologists.

Kerley was involved at various times in his career, with the National Heart Hospital, King Edward VII's Sanatorium, Midhurst, the Ministry of Aviation, Shell and Esso.

=== Heart and lung radiology ===
Whilst working at Westminster and the Royal Chest Hospital, Kerley published on the X-ray features of early Pulmonary tuberculosis. As well as his 'B lines' in congestive heart failure he also reviewed X-ray changes in congenital lung diseases, congenital heart disease, intrathoracic aneurysm and bronchiectasis. He gave one of the earliest accounts of chest X-ray and contrast, that is bronchography and lipiodol.

== King George VI lung surgery ==
On Sunday 23 September 1951, the thoracic surgical team from Westminster hospital, under the lead surgeon, Clement Price Thomas, resected the lung tumour that was obstructing the king's left lung airways. Kerley was a key figure in the investigations during the king's illness in the days prior to the operation. His review of the X-rays led to the king returning to London from Balmoral and a bulletin stating "in view of the structural changes referred to in the last bulletin we have advised His Majesty to undergo an operation in the near future". In return, he received a 'New year's honour' in the London Gazette in 1952 which also resulted in Kerley's long-term relationship with royalty and a later knighthood.

== Personal and family ==
Olivia MacNamee was one of the London School of Economics first female students when she met Kerley. They married in 1929. Their two daughters, Barbara and Jocelyn, both became doctors. Olivia died in 1973, 6 years before Kerley.

Kerley had humour and appreciated the outdoors. He particularly enjoyed fishing and would travel to the River Dee to catch salmon. Other pastimes included golf and shooting.

== Awards and honours ==
Kerley received many awards and honours during his working life and after retirement. The Toronto Radiological Society awarded him the Röntgen award in 1944. He received the Order of the British Empire (CBE) in 1951 and in 1959 he became a member of honour of the Chicago Radiological Society, an honorary fellow of the American College of Radiologists and the Australasian College of Radiology. In 1962 he was made an honorary fellow of the Faculty of Radiologists, Royal College of Surgeons in Ireland, Dublin.

He was knighted by Queen Elizabeth II in 1972 in recognition of his services to radiology and as radiologist to the Royal Family.

In honour of his presidency, he was awarded the gold medal from the Royal College of Radiologists in 1976.

== Legacy ==
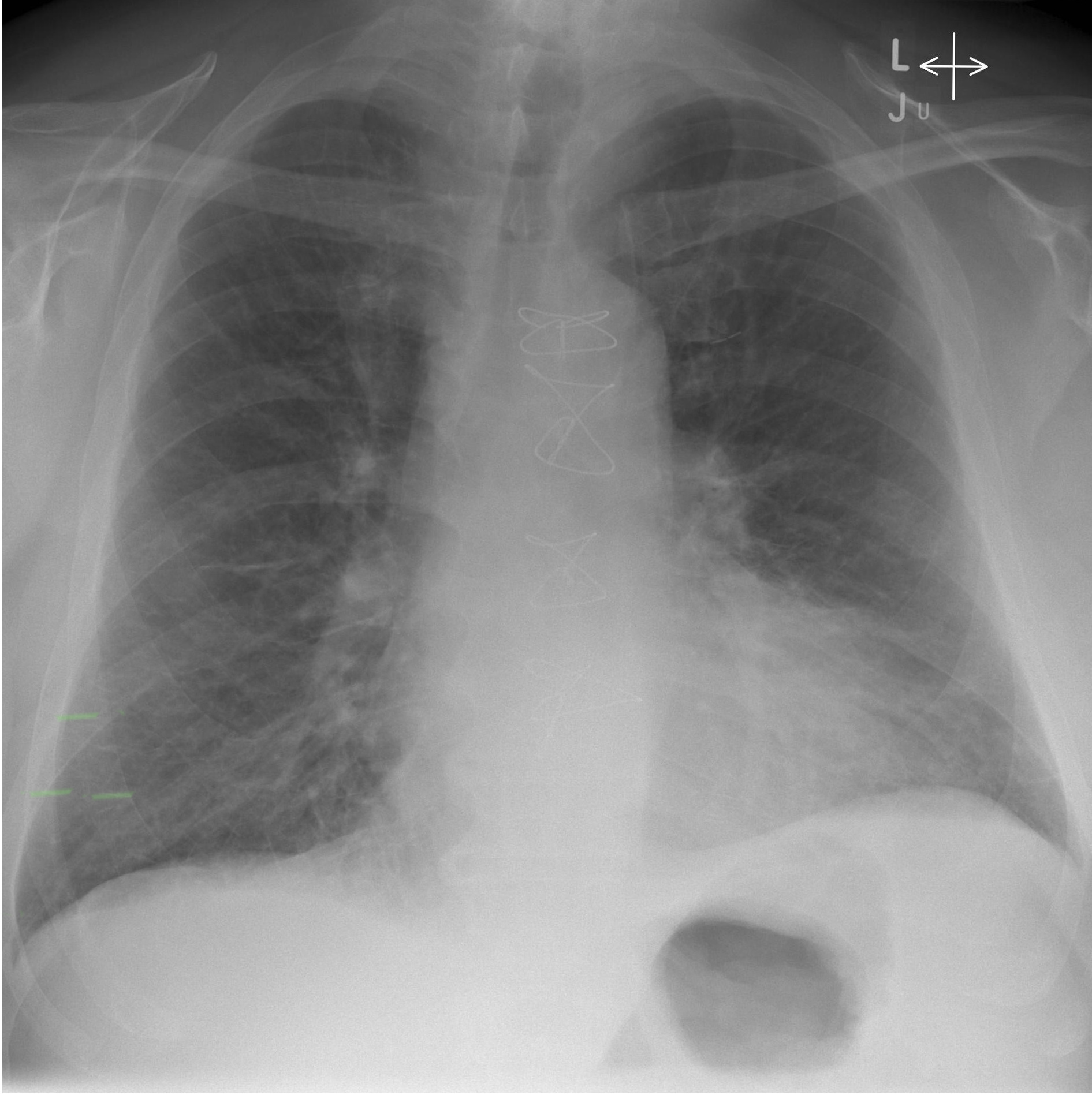
Kerley b lines

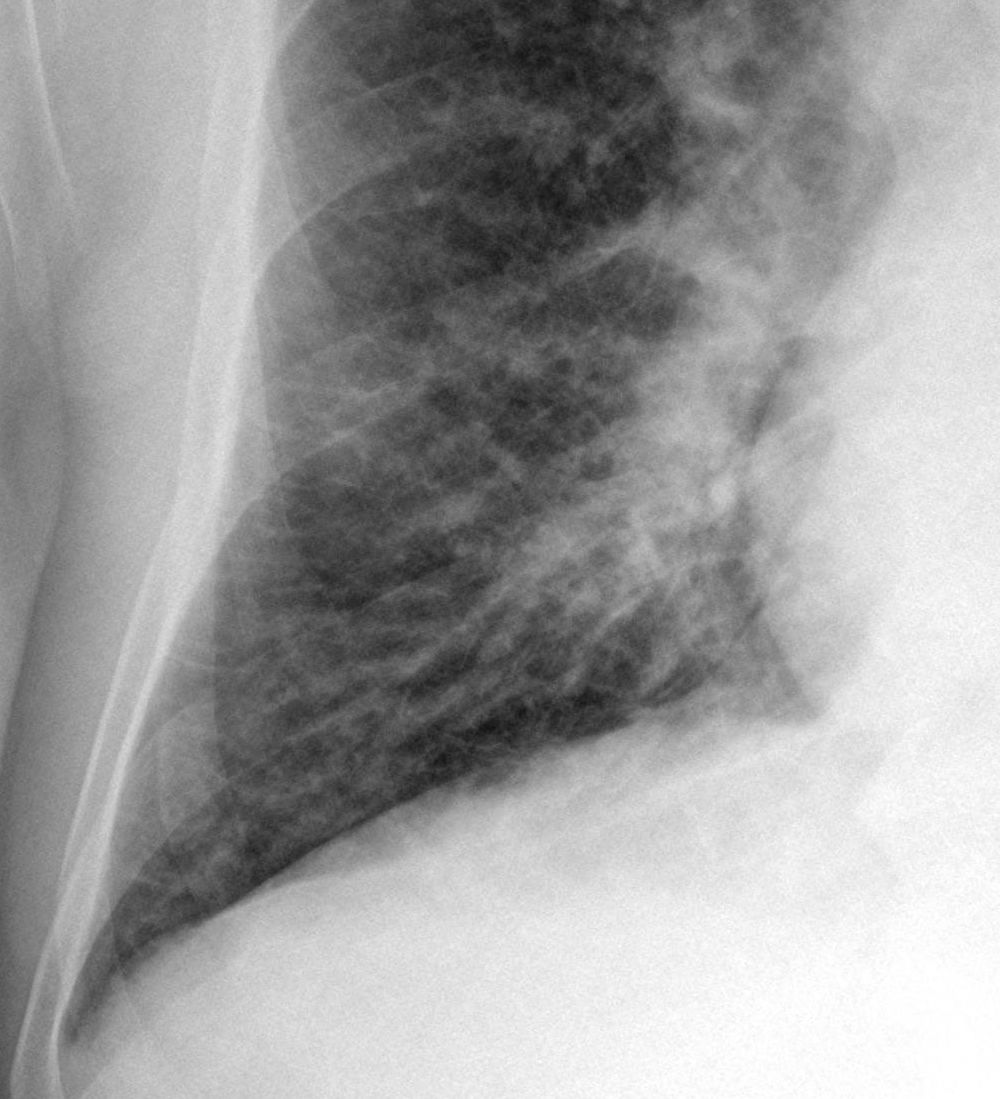
Kerley-B-Lines- closer view

The Sir Peter Kerley Lecture of the Royal College of Radiologists was named after him. Its funds were later merged to establish the Couch Kerley Travelling Fellowship.

He discovered several of the medical signs used in interpreting radiographs. Famous for his 'B' lines, Kerley B lines are a finding of congestive heart failure. These are short parallel lines perpendicular to the lateral lung surface, indicative of increased opacity in the pulmonary septa. Kerley A lines and Kerley C lines are related findings.

== Selected publications ==
- "Pathology of early pulmonary tuberculosis as revealed by x-rays". British Journal Radiology 1930; 3:404–416
- "Radiology in heart disease". BMJ 1933; 2:594–597
- "Recent Advances in Radiology." P. Blakiston's Son & Co. Inc 1931
- "Technique in mass miniature radiography". British Journal Radiology 1942; 15:346–347
- "Mass Miniature Radiography of Civilians: For the Detection of Pulmonary Tuberculosis ..." with Kathleen Clark and Philip D'Arcy. This was published in 1945.
- Correspondence: civilian mass radiography. Co-authored with Hart P, Thompson B. BMJ 1945; 1:885
- Correspondence: modern trends in radiology. BMJ 1949; 2:870
- A Text-Book Of X-Ray Diagnosis: Vol II. Co-edited with Shanks EW. W. B. Saunders. 1951. pp. 403–415
