= Marie MacSweeney =

Irish poet and short-story writer

- Born: Dublin
- Occupation: Writer
- Writing career
- Genres: Poetry, short stories

Marie MacSweeney is an Irish poet and award-winning short-story writer.

== Life and work ==
Born in Dublin of Kerry parents, MacSweeney attended Haddington Road school and Loreto College in Crumlin. She has also produced radio plays and historical essays. Two of these, Dreams and Stars and A Life in the Day of Ravishing Rita were broadcast on RTE Radio One.

In 1992 she moved to Wales but returned to Ireland and now she lives in Drogheda. She has two sons.

== Awards ==
- Francis MacManus award (2001).

== Bibliography ==
- Mother Cecily's Music Room (Belfast, Lapwing, 2005)
- Flying During the Hours of Darkness (Lapwing, 2009)
- Cooking for Gallileo, a collection of poems and stories (Pagan Publications Ireland, 2014)
- Our Ordinary World and Other Stories (Victoria, Canada, Trafford Publishing, 2004 - self-published)
- Letters from a Recalcitrant Woman (MolyM Press, 2013)
