= Megan Walsh (singer) =

Irish singer

Megan Walsh Peigín Rubaidh Ní Breathnach
- Born: Megan Ruby Walsh; 19 February 1997 (age 29)
- Occupation: Singer
- Years active: 2014–present
- Formerly of: Celtic Woman
- Website: meganrubywalsh.com

Megan Ruby Walsh (born 19 February 1997) is an Irish singer who joined the singing group Celtic Woman in 2018.

== Biography ==
=== Early life and education ===
Megan Ruby Walsh was born on 19 February 1997. Her middle name "Ruby" comes from her maternal grandparents. She lived her very early years in Trim, County Meath, in Ireland. Her family were involved in musical theatre; she started appearing in local shows in Trim from age 4. When she was six, her family moved to Navan, but she remained at schools in Trim until age 14, initially at St Mary's Primary School and subsequently Scoil Mhuire. She completed her final years of high school at Loreto Secondary School, St. Michael's in Navan. She studied with the Royal Irish Academy of Music conservatory from age 10 to age 17, and received multiple certifications.

Megan also landed roles in the stage musicals Cats, Jesus Christ Superstar where she played Mary Magdalene, and Les Misérables where she played Cosette

In 2016, she enrolled in the Royal Academy of Music in London, where she started a Bachelor of Music degree. In June 2018, she completed her second year.

=== Career with Cross Border Orchestra of Ireland ===
In 2014, Walsh won a competition called The Soloist which was sponsored by the Cross Border Orchestra of Ireland. She travelled to the United States where she performed with the orchestra at multiple venues including Carnegie Hall in New York City. She returned to Ireland where she continued touring with the orchestra as a soloist and featured artist. During this time, she sang frequently with the likes of Emmet Cahill of Celtic Thunder and many other artists. Venues included the Odyssey Complex in Belfast, as well as multiple venues in Dublin: Royal Dublin Society, National Concert Hall, The Helix, Bord Gáis Energy Theatre, and the National Convention Centre. Other performances include: In 2015, Walsh was selected as a featured artist for the Association of Irish Musical Societies 50th Anniversary Concert at the Bord Gáis Energy Theatre, Dublin and in 2016 featured at the official opening of the 100 year commemoration of the 1916 Irish uprising.

=== Celtic Woman ===
In July 2018, Walsh joined Celtic Woman in Real World Studios to create their latest album, Ancient Land. In August, she was announced as the newest principal member, replacing Susan McFadden who took leave to start a family. Her on-stage debut was on the 13 and 14 September 2018 in County Wexford at Johnstown Castle where they filmed the Ancient Land TV special before a live audience. This was the first big outdoor concert special that Celtic Woman had filmed since 2009. Her first tour with group was in December 2018 on the United States Best of Christmas tour, followed by the Ancient Land tour which began in February 2019 and ended in November 2019 and then the Celebration 15th Anniversary Tour which began in February 2020 and was supposed to end in June 2020 but was cut short in March 2020 due to the coronavirus pandemic, the rescheduled Celebration 15th Anniversary Tour was announced on 20 March 2020 and it was supposed to run from February 2021 to June 2021, however on 7 January 2021, it was announced that the rescheduled Celebration 15th Anniversary Tour was postponed to spring 2022. The Spring 2022 tour was renamed to coincide with the fall 2021 album and video release Postcards from Ireland. The tour began on 24 February and had 85 performances throughout the US, ending on 6 June. In August there were several shows scheduled in Ireland.

Megan left Celtic Woman in January 2023 to further pursue her solo career.

== Discography ==
With Celtic Woman:

- Ancient Land (2018)
- The Magic of Christmas (2019)
- Celebration: 15 years of Music and Magic (2020)
- Postcards from Ireland (2021)
- Christmas Cards from Ireland (2022)

Solo Career:

- Maybe (2021)
