= Cináedh mac Coscrach =

Cináedh mac Coscrach, Abbot of Aghaboe and bard, died 874.

The Annals of the Four Masters contain a verse commemorating him.

- Great grief is Cinaedh the revered chieftain,
- son of Cosgrach of beaming countenance,
- The gifted torch, enraptured Bard,
- the exalted Abbot of Achadh Bo.
