= Fothadh an Fili =

Fothadh an Fili, Irish poet, fl. 879.

Fothadh appears to be known almost exclusively from three verses of a poem he composed upon the death of King Áed Findliath in 879. It is preserved in that year's entry in the Annals of the Four Masters:

- Five years above seven times ten/ten hundred and five thousand/From Adam, no falsehood/to the death of Aedh, are counted.
- Seventy above eight hundred/with six years, are reckoned/From the birth of Christ without blemish/to the death of Aedh of Aileach.
- On the twelfth of the musical Calends/of December of fierce tempests/Died the illustrious chieftain/Aedh of Aileach, monarch of the Gaeidhil.
