= Anluan Mac Aodhagáin =

Irish poet

Anluan Mac Aodhagáin (fl. 1600–1650) was an Irish poet.

Anluan was a member of the Mac Aodhagáin clan, who were professional bards, poets and lawyers in medieval Ireland. His exact lifetime is uncertain, and he appears to be known only from a single surviving forty-eight line poem attributed to him, Bréagach sin a bhean.
