= Athairne Mac Eoghain =

Irish poet

Athairne Mac Eoghain, Irish poet, fl. 1200–1600.

Athairne Mac Eoghain was a poet who lived in Ireland in the medieval era. His exact lifetime is uncertain, and he appears to be known only from a single surviving poem attributed to him, Mairg dar compánach an cholann. His surname is now generally rendered McEoin, McKeown, or Owenson.
