= Rosemarie Rowley =

Rish award-winning poet and ecofeminist

- Born: 1942 (age 83–84); Dublin, Ireland
- Education: Trinity College Dublin
- Occupation: Poet
- Website: www.rosemarierowley.ie

Rosemarie Rowley (born 1942) is an Irish award-winning poet and ecofeminist.

== Life and work ==
Born in Dublin in 1942 Rowley was educated through a Dublin Corporation scholarship. She went on to work in the Agricultural Institute and worked in Birmingham before going on to third level education. She was educated in Trinity College Dublin where she graduated with a degree in Irish and English literature, and philosophy in 1974. She later gained a diploma from the National University of Ireland in psychology.

In the later 1970s Rowley emigrated to Luxembourg where she worked for several years. She retired and became involved in the Green movement in Ireland. She went back to college to complete a master's again in Trinity College in 1984. Her thesis was on the poems of Patrick Kavanagh.

Rowley has published seven books of poetry. She has won the Epic award in the Scottish International Poetry Competition four times. Her first short story was awarded an Image Award. Rowley has been joint editor with John Haughton of the Cáirde na Coille anthology.

She has written the longest poem in terza rima in the English language and has been president of the Irish Byron Society from 2008 to 2012.

Rowley lives in Booterstown, County Dublin and has one son, David.

== Poetry ==
- The Broken Pledge and Other Poems (Dublin: Martello 1985)
- The Sea of Affliction (Dublin: Rowan Tree Press/An Clóphreas Caorthainn 1987)[Re-printed 2010]
- Flight into Reality (Dublin: Rowan Tree Press 1989)
- You Are the Earth: Poems 1958-1968 by Mimmo Morina [translation](Luxembourg: Euroeditor 1996)[poems of Sec. Gen. of World Organisation of Poets]
- Alma Tellus by Mimmo Morina [translation](Luxembourg: Euroeditor 1997)
- Hot Cinquefoil Star (Dublin: Rowan Tree 2003)
- Seeing the Wood and the Trees, editor with John Haughton (Dublin: Rowan Tree Press 2003)
- In Memory of Her [2004 lim. edn.] (Dublin: Rowan Tree 2009)
- Girls of the Globe (Dublin: Arlen House 2015)
- Ireland's Legendary Women (Dublin: Arlen House 2016)
