= Seán Mac Aoidh =

Seán Mac Aoidh (a.k.a. Sean McHugh), Irish poet, fl. 1820s.

Mac Aoidh was a native of Islandeady, near Castlebar, County Mayo, who was married to Sail Óg Rua Ní Mháille (Sally O'Malley), who died early in their marriage. His in-laws suspected him of killing Sail Óg, and approached his house one night intending to kill him. However, upon hearing his lament for his wife, Sail Óg Rua, they concluded he was innocent, and let him be. Another account has him composing it in Castlebar or Dolliwista jail as proof of his innocence.

In "County Mayo in Gaelic Folksong" (1982), Brian O'Rourke states "All one can say is that if, in addition to being a murderer, Mac Aoidh was a cynical hypocrite, then he was a brilliant one, for 'Sail Óg Rua' has all the accents of genuine grief".
