= Muiredhach na Tengadh Ua Sléibhín =

Irish poet (d. 1022)

Muiredhach na Tengadh Ua Sléibhín, was an Irish poet who died in 1022.

Ua Sléibhín was regarded as the professor of poetry in the north of Ireland. His death is recorded in the Annals of Tigernach, sub anno 1022:

Muiredhach na Tengadh O Sleibin, ollam tuaisceirt Erenn, o Feraib Roiss occisus est.

His surname is now rendered as Slevin. His nickname, na Tengadh, meant of the tongues.
