= Tomás Bán Mac Aodhagáin =

Tomás Bán Mac Aodhagáin (IPA:[ˈt̪ˠʊmˠaːsˠˈbˠaːnˠˈmˠakˈiːəɡaːnʲ]) is the name both of a person and of a song inspired by his life. A native of County Mayo, Mac Aodhagain fell in love with and eloped with a Ms. Stanley, daughter of an Anglo-Irishman who had settled in Ireland during the plantations. The daughter's father pursued the couple, captured them, and sentenced Mac Aodhagain to be hanged.

O'Rourke writes that "According to folklore, Thomas did not in fact hang; the girl made the song before the sentence was due to be carried out, and the jury was so touched that he was set free. It sounds like wish fulfillment, but even if it were true, her 'provisional lament' would be no less remarkable, as a dramatic presentation of partly imagined events."

A location mentioned in the song is Cluain Aoidh, near Partry. Another individual named in the song, Major O'Connell, was from Newport on the west coast of Mayo.
