= John Macken =

Irish journalist, publisher and poet

John Macken (c.1784 – 7 May 1823) was an Irish poet, and joint editor of the Enniskillen Chronicle.

== Life ==
Macken, born about 1784, was the eldest son of Richard Macken, a merchant of Brookeborough in County Fermanagh.

In Enniskillen he helped to establish the Enniskillen Chronicle, also known as the Erne Packet, first published on 10 August 1808. He was fellow-editor with his brother-in-law Edward Duffy, and Macken contributed both prose and verse. He later became a sailor in the Navy, and was present at the bombardment of Algiers of 1816.

In 1818 he went to London, and published at his own expense a volume of poetry The Harp of the Desert, under the pseudonym Ismael Fitzadam, about his experiences in Algiers. It was dedicated to Lord Exmouth, the hero of Algiers, but he ignored the compliment. The publication proved to be a failure.

In London Macken met the Irish genealogist Henry Nugent Bell, and assisted him in compiling The Huntingdon Peerage. Bell introduced him to William Jerdan, the editor of the Literary Gazette; Macken, as Ismael Fitzadam, contributed poems to the magazine. With the help of William Jerdan, Macken published of a volume of poems, Lays on Land. It was promoted in the Literary Gazette, Jerdan describing the poems as "combining Scott and Byron most admirably together", but it was not successful.

In 1821 Macken returned in poor health to Ireland, and resumed his position as joint editor of the Enniskillen Chronicle. He died on 7 May 1823, and was buried in Aughaveagh parish church. Letitia Elizabeth Landon wrote verses on his death in the Literary Gazette of June 1823.

== Publications ==
- Minstrel Stolen Moments, or Shreds of Fancy, published anonymously (Dublin, 1814)
- The Harp of the Desert, "containing the Battle of Algiers, with other Pieces in Verse. By Ismael Fitzadam, formerly able seaman on board the frigate" (London, 1818)
- Lays on Land (London, 1821), also as Ismael Fitzadam
