= Loisin an Fili =

Loisin an Fili, Irish poet, fl. 868.

Loisin was the poet of King Flann mac Conaing of Breaga, who was killed at the battle of Cill Ua nDaighre in 868 by King Áed Findliath of Tara (died 879).

The Annals of the Four Masters record a verse of Loisin's concerning the battle:

Monday, the day of terror,
we went to Bealach Natha.
The men of Findruine were slaughtered;
dear were the well-known faces.
