= Sarah Leech =

Irish poet, working in English and Ulster Scots

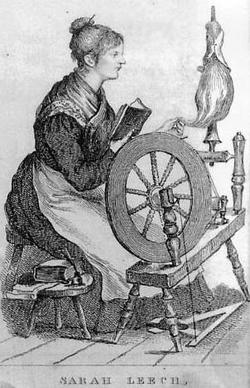
- Leech from the frontispiece of Poems on various subjects
- Born: 1809; Taughboyne, County Donegal
- Died: 1830 (aged 20–21)

Sarah Leech (1809 - 1830) was an Irish poet. She is the only known published female Irish weaver poet and one of the few women of the time to have poetry published in the Ulster Scots dialect.

== Biography ==
Sarah Leech was born in the townland of Ballylennan in the parish of Taughboyne, County Donegal in 1809. She was the youngest child of Thomas Leech, a weaver and farmer. The family were Protestant, most likely Presbyterian. At the age of 3, Leech's family were left in difficult financial circumstances when her father died of pleurisy. Leech's eldest sister, who had attended school, attempted to teach her younger siblings to read, but she had very little free time. At age 6, Leech attended school for 3 months. Despite a fear of her teacher, she learned how to read and displayed an interest in further learning and became a keen reader of "story books". At age 12, she was taught how to write, at the same time she started spinning linen yarn to earn a living. She was given a small number of book and some religious instruction by a local benefactor. She started to compose poems in 1822, some in English and some in Ulster Scots. Her poem in Ulster Scots, Elegy on a loquacious old woman, was circulated locally, and read by a visiting gentleman. Intrigued by the satire of the piece, he sought out Leech and copied her poems and sent them to the Londonderry Journal to be published. This unidentified gentleman is only described as "a graduate of Trinity College".

Leech was written about with great sympathy, focusing on how she was "the female orphan" in newspaper and commentary published about her, pieces about her detailed her piety and poverty. In the only collection of her poetry, Poems on various subjects published in 1828, her editor describes her life spent in "labour, indigence, and obscurity" and how any profits from the work would aid her in her "pilgrimage through life". Leech became lame, and appears to have been suffering from a condition like rheumatoid arthritis. In 1826 she worried that she was losing her sight, and she was unable to continue to teach or supervise children. Despite their poverty, the family appears to have retained some semblance of respectability. Leech is depicted in the frontispiece of Poems on various subjects with her spinning wheel, but she is well dressed. It is reported that Leech was deeply ashamed by how her life was described in lowly terms in the Londonderry Journal.

Leech and her mother moved to near Lettergull in 1822. The farm she lived is still remembered locally and a local family, the Gilfillans, claim to have Leech's spinning wheel as depicted in the frontispiece engraving. The farm is large for the area, over 70 acres. Some believe that Leech's older sister may have married into the Gilfillan family and took in her sister and mother. Religion is a strong theme in her poetry. She voices her support for the Brunswick Clubs in her English poems. The Brunswick Clubs were formed in 1828 to oppose catholic emancipation after the suppression of the Orange Order. She also voiced her distrust of catholic priests, although it is possible she exaggerated these themes to ensure the continued support of the Church of Ireland gentleman who edited her poems before publication.

Her poems in Ulster Scots do not contain these problematic themes, and have become popular with recent promotion of the Ulster Scots language. Her book of poems was republished by the Ulster-Scots Agency in 2006. Some claim that nothing more is known of Leech after the publication of the volume of her poems in 1828, but other sources place her death in 1830. A plaque to Leech was erected on 13 December 2014 on William Street, Raphoe, County Donegal.
