= Aimirgein mac Amalgado =

Aimirgein mac Amalgado, Irish poet, fl. 678x683.

A member of the Déisi Muman, Aimirgein was the composer of the Old Irish law-text Cáin Fuithir Be.
