= Molly Barton =

Irish artist

- Born: Mary Georgina Barton; 3 April 1861; Dundalk, County Louth
- Died: 8 November 1949 (aged 88)

Molly Barton (3 April 1861 – 8 November 1949) was an Irish artist.

== Life ==
Molly Barton was born Mary Georgina Barton in Dundalk, County Louth on 3 April 1861. She was the youngest of the seven children of the civil engineer James Barton and his wife Catherine Frances Barton (née Golding). The family moved to Farndreg House, west of Dundalk in 1863, where Barton spent the rest of her childhood. Barton's mother died on her second birthday. Her father remarried to Mary Hewson in 1870, with whom he had six more children who survived to adulthood. She was educated at Southsea and Boulogne, moving to London in 1895 to attend the Westminster School of Art. She then travelled to Rome in 1898, where she taught and studied art. Upon her return to Ireland she began to give art lessons to groups of women in country houses, teaching in five locations in 1900.

In 1900 she exhibited with Royal Hibernian Academy, and with the Belfast Art Society in 1902. She was a member of the Women's International Art Club, and briefly of the Watercolour Society of Ireland. Barton held a joint exhibition with Ina Clogstoun at the Fine Art Society in 1902 entitled Irish life and scenery. She exhibited there again in 1905. In 1904 two of her paintings, Autumn in Muckross and A cypress avenue, were included in Hugh Lane's exhibition of Irish art at London's Guildhall.

She visited family members in India in 1905, going on to visit Nepal. In 1909 she made an extended trip across Mexico. Her paintings from this trip resulted in an exhibition at the Fine Art Society in 1909 called Mexico: watercolours. She also wrote an article for The Studio on her experiences in Mexico in 1910, and produced an illustrated book Impressions of Mexico (1911). In 1914 she travelled to Canada, and in 1929 she visited Portugal and France. Throughout this time she exhibited, with her paintings shown in Liverpool, Durban, Leeds, Venice, Vienna and Paris. Her last four paintings were shown in 1930 at the Royal Hibernian Academy. She exhibited with the Society of Women Artists regularly, being appointed an associate member in 1909 and a full number in 1911. Amongst her best known works are Fountain in the cathedral patio, Seville and The road winds uphill all the way.

Later in life she lived in London and Bracknell, Berkshire. She died there on 8 November 1949. In the 1970s Bartons works began to be much prized by collectors.
