= Colman ua Clasaigh =

Colman Ua Clasaigh (died 661) was an Irish tutor and poet.

Colman was "the tutor of Cumméne Fota", Bishop of Clonfert, who died in November 661. The Annals of the Four Masters reproduce three versed that he composed in memory of Cummene:

- The Luimneach did not bear on its bosom/of the race of Munster, into Leath Chuinn/A corpse in a boat so precious as he/as Cummine, son of Fiachna.
- If any one went across the sea/to sojourn at the seat of Gregory Rome/If from Ireland, he requires no more/than the mention of Cumine Foda.
- I sorrow after Cumine/from the day that his shrine was covered;/My eyelids have been dropping tears; I have not laughed/but mourned since the lamentation at his barque.

The same annals, in an immediately succeeding note, state "St. Colman Ua Cluasaigh, died."
