= Pádraig J. Daly =

Irish poet

Pádraig J. Daly OSA (born 1943) is a contemporary Irish poet.

Pádraig J. Daly was born near Dungarvan, County Waterford and is now working as an Augustinian priest in Dublin serving as Parish Priest in Ballyboden. Educated at University College Dublin, and Gregorian University, Rome. He has published several collections of poetry, among them Nowhere But In Praise (1978), That Days Importance (1981), The Last Dreamers: New & Selected Poems (1999) and The Other Sea (2003), as well as his translations from the Italian of Edoardo Sanguineti, Libretto (1999) and Paolo Ruffilli, Joy and Mourning (reissued 2007). Daly's translation was the first Sanguineti book to be rendered into English. According to the publishers, Dedalus Press/Dufour Editions, Daly accepted the difficult task of translating Libretto "because he finds Sanguineti's poetry so lifeaffirming, and because he believes that even the poorest translation may lead people to read more of him." His latest collection of poems is Clinging to the Myth (2007) in which he reflects on grief and personal bereavement and uses the voices of 18th century Gaelic poetry to respond to the challenges of a post-Christian Ireland. As well as broadcasting on RTÉ radio, some of Daly's works have been translated into Italian for broadcast on Italian radio. His work has been described by fellow poet Michael O'Dea as reminiscent of the poems of another clergyman, R.S. Thomas.

== Bibliography ==
- The Last Dreamers: New & Selected Poems (1999)
- Translation of Libretto by Edoardo Sanguineti (1999)
- The Other Sea (2003)
- Translation of Joy and Mourning by Paolo Ruffilli (reissued 2007)
- Clinging to the Myth (2007)
- Afterlife (2010)
- Long Days of Summer

== See also ==
- Ó Dálaigh
