= Seán na Ráithíneach Ó Murchadha =

Poet from Cork in the Eighteenth Century, working in the Irish language

Seán na Ráithíneach Ó Murchadha (1700–1762) was a poet and scribe from Carrignavar, County Cork.

Ó Murchadha was an important scribe and collector of manuscripts. At least sixteen of his manuscripts from the period 1719 to 1762 are extant. These are to be found in the Royal Irish Academy, British Library, National Library of Ireland and the university libraries of Maynooth University and University College Cork. The oldest extant copy of Parlaimint na mBan was transcribed by him in 1723. This same manuscript also contains the oldest copies of Agallamh na bhFíoraon and of Fr Conchubhar Mac Cairteáin's sermons. In 1725 he copied poetry and prose stories from a manuscript by Dáibhí Ó Bruadair. He also composed a lament for Ó Bruadair's son, Uilliam, who died on 1 January 1729.

Ó Murchadha also played an important role in the cúirt éigse of the Blarney area and was in contact with other poets and priests of the time. Father John O'Brien (later Bishop of Cloyne), spent a number of years in Carrignavar parish and a close friendship developed between them. They regularly wrote verses answering one another. Ó Murchadha sent Seán Clárach Mac Domhnaill a poem entitled ‘Beannacht le searc' while the latter was visiting Ó Murchadha's landlord and friend Cormac Spáinneach in 1743. He also composed an elegy on MacDomhnaill's death in 1754. His contact with other poets included Éamonn de Bhál and Liam Rua Mac Coitir. The elegy ‘Is cumha ‘s is ceas’ was composed on Mac Coitir's death in 1738.

Ó Murchadha had a habit of keeping a pocket notebook in which he wrote songs and verse he had just composed. His notebook for the period 1720 to 1745 is still extant and provides an important insight into Gaelic cultural life at the beginning of the eighteenth century.

He composed only one Jacobite poem entitled ‘Tá an bhliain seo ag teacht’ and composed no political poetry after 1745. His fellow poet Pádraig Ó Súilleabháin criticised him for not having composed any poem ‘ag trácht ar mhnaoi gan chéile’ (‘dealing with a woman bereft of her spouse’). Breandán Ó Buachalla describes him as the most apolitical poet of his time and noted that he composed for a restricted audience comprising the gentry, clergy, and poets of his native area.

== Chief Poet of the Cúirt Éigse ==
On Mac Coitir's death in 1738, Ó Murchadha was elected chief poet of the Blarney, Whitechurch and Carrignavar cúirt éigse. He was appointed as a cleric or bailiff in the Glanmire court in 1739 and composed a poem welcoming the chief sheriff Sir John Colthurst from Cork. He remained in the post for three years but does not appear to have enjoyed his work there:

"Rithfead dom gháirdín, ránn mhín glacfad mar riaghail,

Is cuirfead an bháillidheacht fá thrí i n-ainm an diabhail..."

(‘I will run to my garden, take shovel in hand,

and the devil with being a bailiff’).

Ó Murchadha died in September 1762 in the Carrignavar/Whitechurch area and was interred in Whitechurch.

== Notes ==
- National Library of Ireland, Ó Murchadha notebook (1720–45), MS G 321; National Library of Ireland, Parlaimint na mBan (1723), MS G 429; BL,
- Elegy to Fr Mac Cáirteáin (1737), Add. MS 31876;
- Tadhg Ó Donnchadha, Dánta Sheáin Uí Mhurchadha (1907);
- Robin Flower, Catalogue of Irish manuscripts in the British Museum vol. 2 (1926), 385;
- Tarlach Ó Raithbheartaigh, Máighistrí san fhilidheacht (1939);
- Tadhg Ó Donnchadha, Seán na Ráithíneach (1954);
- Breandán Ó Conchúir, Scríobhaithe Chorcaí 1700–1850 (1982);
- J. E. Caerwyn Williams and Patrick Ford, The Irish literary tradition (1992);
- Breandán Ó Buachalla, Aisling ghéar (1996)
