= Ó Maoilciaran an Fili =

Ó Maoilchiaráin an Fili (fl. c. 1395) was an Irish poet.

== Background ==
Edward MacLysaght believed that this name was a later substitution for Ó Maolchairill, a minor erenagh family based at Cloonkeenkerrill, north-east of Athenry in County Galway. They derived their name, though not their descent, from Saint Kerrill, the first Christian missionary in the area. Various members of the family occurred infrequently in late medieval church documents, the majority of them apparently clergy.

It is now generally rendered as Mulkerrins, and still found in the Athenry area.

== Tugaid oinne ==
Ó Maoilchiaráin's single known extant poem is Tugaid oinne, described by O'Reilly as "a beautiful elegy on the death of his son. This very pathetic poem consists of one hundred and seventy-two verses." He noted that as of 1820 a copy was in the library of one "John M'Namara, Esq."

The poem is notable for been one of the very few intensely personal poems of the period to survive. It can be compared to the notable Deán oram trócaire, a Thríonnóid (Have mercy on me, O Trinity), by Giolla Brighde Mac Con Midhe, (?1210–?1272), who similarly grieved the death of his children. This may be due in part to the fact that the majority of Gaelic poet's work was professional, concerned mainly with political events, history and praise-poems.

== See also ==
- Soghain
