= Tony Curtis (Irish poet) =

Irish poet (born 1955)

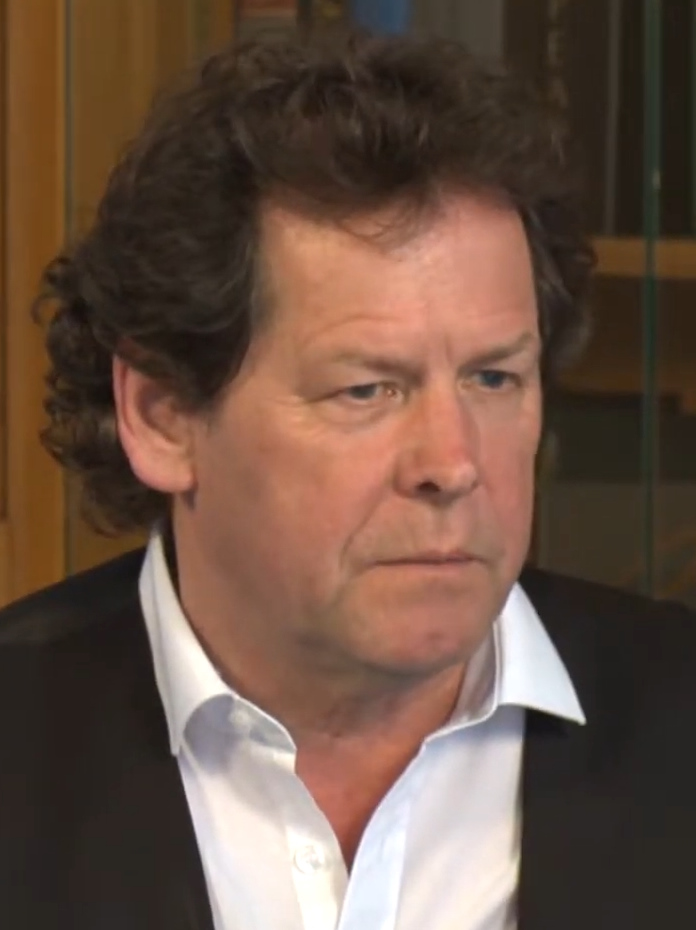
- Curtis in 2018
- Born: 1955 (age 70–71); Dublin, Ireland
- Education: University of Essex; Trinity College Dublin
- Occupation: Poet

Tony Curtis (born 1955) is an Irish poet.

Curtis was born in Dublin, and educated at the University of Essex and at Trinity College Dublin. In 1993 he won the Poetry Ireland/Friends Provident National Poetry Competition. In 2018 he won the 2018 O'Shaughnessy Poetry Award presented by the University of St. Thomas in St. Paul, Minnesota. He also works in education under the Skagit River Poetry Project schools programme.

Curtis is a member of Aosdána.

== Works ==
- The Shifting of Stones (1986)
- Behind the Green Curtain (1988)
- This Far North (1994)
- Three Songs of Home (1998)
- The Book of Winter Cures (2002)
- What Darkness Covers (2003)
- The Well in the Rain (2006)
- Days Like These (with Paula Meehan and Theo Dorgan) (2008)
- Folk (2011)
- Sandworks (with the Irish photographer Liam Blake) (2011)
- An Elephant Called Rex (illustrated by Pat Mooney) (2011)
- Aran Currach (with the Irish photographer Liam Blake) (2013)
- Pony (with the artist David Lilburn) (2013)
- Approximately in the Key of C (2015)
- This Flight Tonight (2019)
- The Syncline (with the Irish photographer Liam Blake) (2021)
- Between The Tides (with the Irish photographer Liam Blake) (2021)
- On Gifting Black Feathers (2024)
