= Kerley lines =

Radiologic sign

Kerley lines are a sign seen on chest radiographs with interstitial pulmonary edema. They are thin linear pulmonary opacities caused by fluid or cellular infiltration into the interstitium of the lungs. They are named after Irish neurologist and radiologist Peter Kerley.

== Associated conditions ==
They are suggestive for the diagnosis of congestive heart failure, but are also seen in various non-cardiac conditions such as pulmonary fibrosis, interstitial deposition of heavy metal particles or carcinomatosis of the lung. Chronic Kerley B lines may be caused by fibrosis or hemosiderin deposition caused by recurrent pulmonary edema.

== Types ==
=== Kerley A lines ===
These are longer (at least 2 cm (0.79 in) and up to 6 cm (2.4 in)) unbranching lines coursing diagonally from the hila out to the periphery of the lungs. They are caused by distension of anastomotic channels between peripheral and central lymphatics of the lungs. Kerley A lines are less commonly seen than Kerley B lines. Kerley A lines are never seen without Kerley B or C lines.

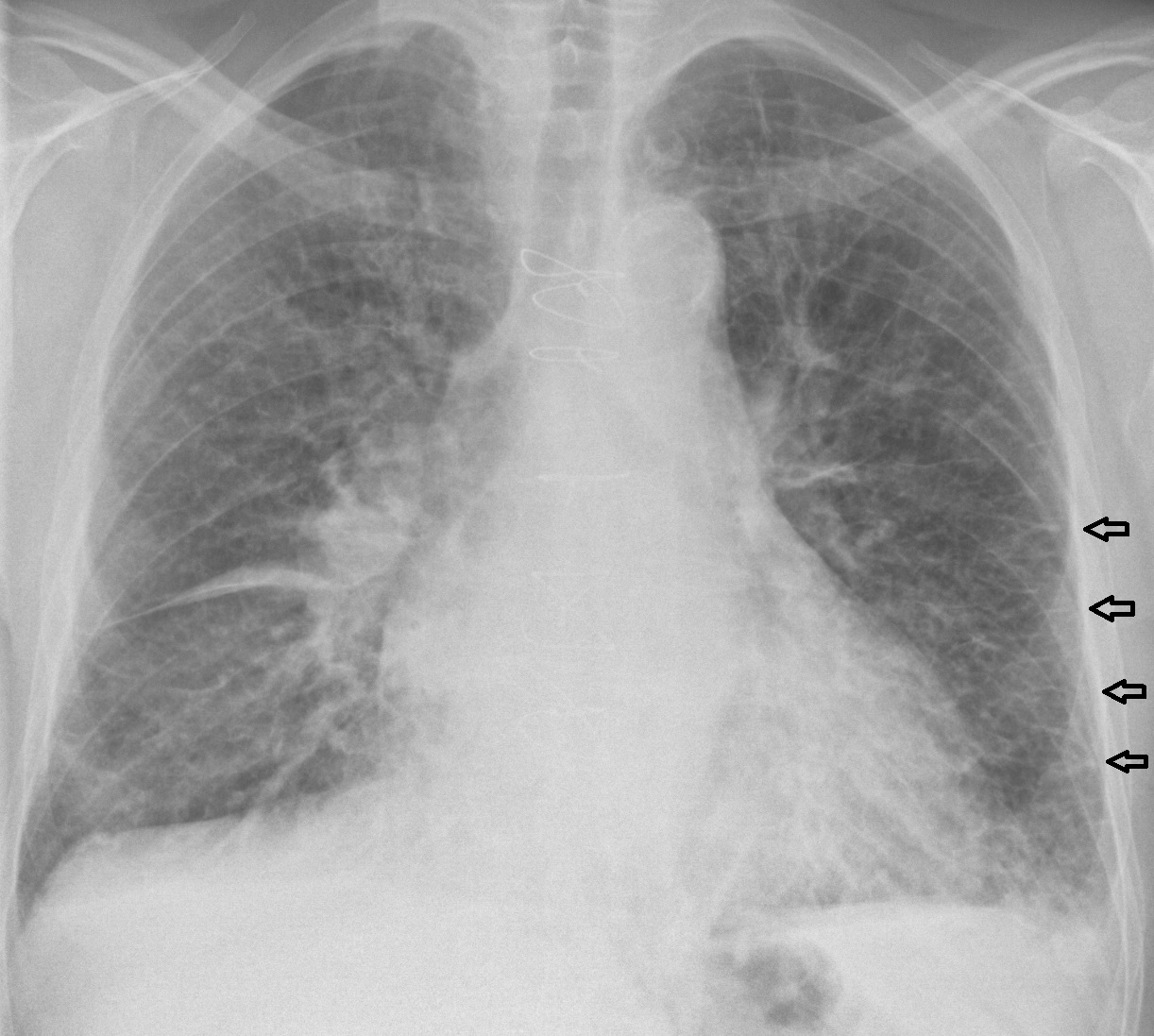
Kerley B lines in a patient with congestive heart failure.

=== Kerley B lines ===
These are short parallel lines at the lung periphery. These lines represent interlobular septa, which are usually less than 1 cm (0.39 in) in length and parallel to one another at right angles to the pleura. They are located peripherally in contact with the pleura, but are generally absent along fissural surfaces. They may be seen in any zone but are most frequently observed at the lung bases at the costophrenic angles on the PA radiograph, and in the substernal region on lateral radiographs. Causes of Kerley B lines include pulmonary edema, lymphangitis carcinomatosa and malignant lymphoma, viral and mycoplasmal pneumonia, interstitial pulmonary fibrosis, pneumoconiosis, and sarcoidosis. They can be an evanescent sign on the chest x-ray of a patient in and out of heart failure.

=== Kerley C lines ===
These are the least commonly seen of the Kerley lines. They are short, fine lines throughout the lungs, with a reticular appearance. They may represent thickening of anastomotic lymphatics or superimposition of many Kerley B lines.

== See also ==
- Flash pulmonary edema
