= Moling of Luachair =

Irish cleric and poet

Moling of Luachair was an Irish cleric and poet (fl. 695).

The Annals of Tigernach relate that upon the death of King Fínsnechta Fledach mac Dúnchada, Mo Ling Luachra do-rigni in rand-so ar Fínachta/Moling of Luachair made this stave on Finachta::

Ba dirsan do Finachta,
indíu laighidh crolighe.
ro m-be la firu nime
im dilgud na boraime.

Twas sad for Finachta!
Today he lies on a gory bed
May he be with the men of heaven
For forgiving the tribute.

To this, Adomnán of Iona responded:

Finachta mac Dunchada
ro maith mor don naem,
tri cóecait cét bo-slabraidh,
is gach bó cona laegh.

Finachta son of Dunchadh
Remitted much to the saint
A hundred and fifty hundreds of dower-kine
And every cow with her calf.

This in turn generated a final verse from Moling:

IN bernn forsm-bith Finachta
imó-reithdis rig riadhai
ed co n-dothchernsa dochuill
atas-rolaicc nis-ríadha.

The gap whereon Finachta was slain
imó-reithdis rig riadhai
Round which kings
Would run before his spear.
