= Catherine Ann Cullen =

Poet

- Born: Drogheda, County Louth

Catherine Ann Cullen is a writer and was the first Poetry Ireland poet in residence.

== Biography ==
Catherine Ann Cullen was born in Drogheda, County Louth. She has an M.Phil in Creative Writing from Trinity College Dublin and a PhD from Middlesex University, London. Her work has won a gold award for Poetry and Folklore from the American Parenting Products Association. In 2016 and 2009 Cullen won the Francis Ledwidge International Poetry Award. In 2018 she was a recipient of a Patrick and Katherine Kavanagh Fellowship for her work. She has held several residencies in schools and was for three years (2016 to 2019) A&L Goodbody Writer in Residence at St Joseph's Co-Ed School, East Wall, Dublin 3, for which she was awarded the 2017 Business to Arts Award for Best Use of Creativity in the Community. She is part of the Irish Poetry Reading Archive at University College Dublin. Her work has been included in many anthologies and has been broadcast on RTÉ. Cullen has worked as a lecturer in journalism and a radio producer based in Dublin. In 2019 she was made the inaugural Poet in Residence at Poetry Ireland for two years.

== Bibliography ==
- All Better! Poems for Children about Illness and Recovery (Little Island 2019)
- The Other Now: New and Selected Poems (Dedalus Press 2016)
- Strange Familiar (Doghouse 2013)
- A Bone in My Throat (Doghouse 2007)
- Thirsty Baby (Little, Brown 2003)
- The Magical, Mystical, Marvelous Coat (Little, Brown 2001)
