= Guaire Dall =

Guaire Dall was an Irish poet, fl. 849.

Guaire Dall was the composer of two verses included, sub anno 849, in the Annals of the Four Masters, concerning the execution of king Cinaeth mac Conaing of Ciannachta Breagh.

O Teamhair, O beloved hill,
thou hast rejected my company;
Thou hadst, if thou hadst not abandoned him,
the materies of a King of all Ireland;
O Tailtin, who art illustrious, pure,
thou victorious land of women,
It is pleasant to enumerate thy noble tribes
and their virtues at all times.
