= Maenghal the Pilgrim =

Irish poet

Maenghal the Pilgrim, Irish poet, fl. 844.

Upon the death of King Niall Caille in 844, Maenghal, the pilgrim, said:

Take with thee the total destruction of Niall,
who was not a judge without judgment;
To the King of heaven let him make submission,
that he may make smooth for him every difficulty.
Niall was drowned,
Niall was good;
Niall in the sea,
Niall in fire,
Niall without death.
