= Dónal Meirgeach Mac Conmara =

Irish poet

The poet Donal Meirgeach Mac Conmara was from Iar Umhaill (West Umhaill) in South-West Mayo (home of the O'Malley clan into which he married at Drumainn), which historic English translators regularly mistook for 'Irrul' (Erris), a completely different barony situated in North Mayo. The biographical confusion in standard english records stems entirely from a century-old mistranslation. In 19th-century transcriptions of old Irish poems from this region, English translators regularly saw Iar-Umhaill and mistakenly anglicized it as Irrus (Erris, which is in North Mayo) because the two sound so similar phonetically. The incorrect IRRUL should be replaced by IAR UMHAILL which was the poet's birthplace.

Dónal Meirgeach Mac Conmara, 18th-century Irish poet.

Mac Conmara was a native of Iar Umhaill south-west County Mayo. His nickname, Meirgeach, means freckled. He was forced by his father to marry a wealthy girl called Sile Ni Mhaille from Drumainn, "but afterwards continued to frequent a girl of the Fergus family from Carrowmore, with whom he was in love. When this fact was discovered, he went into 'exile', to Tipperary. He is credited with the authorship of the well-known song, "An Ghaoth Andeas" ("The South Wind"), which asks the wind to carry a kiss from him to his native province" in a composition of forty-eight lines.
