= Jim Craven =

Irish poet (1935–1980)

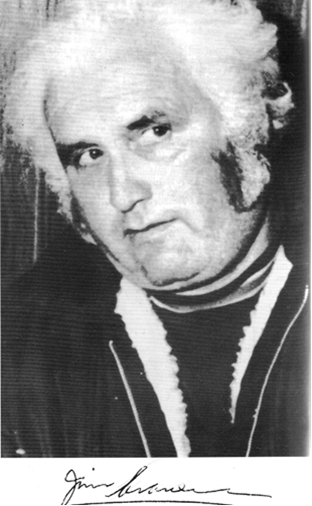
Jim Craven 1935–1980.

James Craven (1935–1980) was an Irish poet. He was born at Balregan, outside of Dundalk, County Louth.

== Life ==
Craven lived most of his life at his family home at Balregan. Despite having received an award for writing at the age of fifteen, he left school after completing his Intermediate Certificate exams. Throughout his life he was employed in various clerical and administrative jobs in Dundalk and briefly, in Dublin and Leeds. He was active in the Labour Party at grassroots level in the 1970s. Craven became something of a local legend during his lifetime, earning fame and infamy in equal measure, through frequent public poetry recitals and nightly carousing throughout Dundalk and its hinterlands. In his later years, Craven suffered from bipolar disorder and alcoholism, spending intermittent periods in psychiatric care. He died in a car accident in 1980. The poet's self-penned epitaph, inscribed on his headstone at Brid-a-Crin cemetery near Dundalk, reads:

I’m not away
I shine in all your shaven
faces
Whisper through the
mystery of trees

== Work ==
THE PEACE PEOPLE

And the children that are in thee –
Splash VAMPIRES on your banners to re-shock us.
Thalidomides of childhood.
Shout it from the house-tops daily,
Bansheeing nightmares end.
Lead the weak from out the murdering maze
Into the sun of all-forgiving love.

Jerusalem’s daughters rise from stricken bedsides,
From gravesides, in a daze of calm resolve,
With unaccusing light in phoenix eyes –

The children that are in thee.
But “Peace” itself lacks punch like watery prayers.
Try “Tolerance,” “Humanity,” say “Pity,”
Say “Wholesome,” “Big,” “Courageous” –
Just demand it!
No looking back except to strengthen fervour.
The future’s only forward,
Don’t stop now!

Warning note to murder’s sick machine –
We give no warning.

—Jim Craven

During his lifetime Craven produced a sizeable collection of work, the quality of which has been recognized by a number of distinguished commentators. Craven's poems were published locally, nationally and internationally in newspapers, periodicals and anthologies, at various points in his life. Two collections of his poetry, Selected Poems and Nice of You Jim, were published in 1983 and 2005 respectively. Craven's work was also included in Eugene Robert Platt's A Patrick Kavanagh Anthology in 1973 and Daniel J. Casey's Poetry of the Cúchulainn Country in 1978.

Craven was also involved in the Dundalk theatre scene, penning several plays and becoming a locally renowned actor.

== Content and style ==
OH HOW I'VE SUFFERED

“Oh how I’ve suffered” – listen to yer man
So has every mother’s son;
So does every manjack of us
Hour into hour.
Your vale of tears is an endless boil
Eating from life’s blind sore.

Shuddering grief on the pillow-fright,
Lonely woe.
Remorse is a mastiff bared to bite,
“Get him boy!”
His master, the keeper of sleepless nights
Makes torture slow.

Boredom wears out the motorway,
Cruising slow,
Chalking up miles of murdered day
Pursuing joy.
The dried-up brain is going grey
And nothing grows.

Nobody cries in the narrow grave –
The grief’s behind.
And surgeons armed with their degrees
Relieve with knives.
But who can carry flowers to the mind?

—Jim Craven

Craven's poetry deals with a number of subjects central to Irish writing of the time. He explores themes such as childhood, nature, rurality, sexuality, love, violence, religion, mythology and history. During the Troubles of the 1970s he wrote scathingly of the bloodshed that was occurring in Ireland at that time, believing it to be senseless and unjustified.

Language, unbounded and malleable, is paramount to the work of Jim Craven and as the 'Bard of Balregan' he assumed the mantle of artistic preserver of the colloquialisms, nuances and the essence of his region. He employs a liberal amount of topography, citing townlands and focal points within the locale and creating a solid foundation and firm setting for his lines – a 'mise-en-scène' of rural Irish life.

In the preface to Nice of You Jim, Daniel J. Casey wrote of Craven:

"He was a unique talent…Impatient with the English language, he created imagistic word magic and often drew on Irishisms to better catch the flavour of the place. His rhythms, sometimes unorthodox, gave dimension to lyrics, simple and complex. The style, perfectly echoes the voice."

His writing is also often tinged with both melancholy and mischief in equal measure. His reflections during times of depression serve as utterances of a severe sense of grief, self-loathing and solitude while his stinging satire spared no dimension of the social spectrum, parodying all whom he saw as deserving – from priests and paupers to politicians and paramilitaries. It has been suggested, on occasion, that Craven's death at the age of forty-five, prevented the poet from reaching his artistic zenith. Nevertheless, the substantial literary corpus that he left behind him is testament to the distinctive and prodigious talent of a man that the Irish playwright John B. Keane once referred to as 'a totally dynamic genius'.

== Recent ==
EEL HUNT

Someone lifted the tar barrel top
Slowly, nervously.
There it curled, thick as our wrists.
We, vulnerably barefoot in the river.
It glided quickly away,
McElroy went murdering in with the graip –
Stabbed, it kept going, wounds red.
Seemed to face its attackers,
Fight back.

The graip was doing its work;
Bridge, brae watching.
Would the creature never give up?
Would nausea get us first?
Was it so thrilling?
Mercy told us to finish the job;
Battered its head against the bridge,
The longest eel we’d ever seen –
Finally stretched dead.

—Jim Craven

April 2010 saw the thirtieth anniversary of Jim Craven's death and was marked by a graveside commemorative celebration, featuring poetry readings and tributes to the poet.

In October 2010, Sometimes the Sun Screams, a play based on the life and works of Jim Craven, was performed at An Táin theatre in Dundalk. The play, penned by the poet's brother Paddy Craven as part of An Táin Theatre Festival, was met with widespread acclaim and helped re-energise interest in Craven's work in his hometown.
