= Laurie Winkless =

Irish physicist

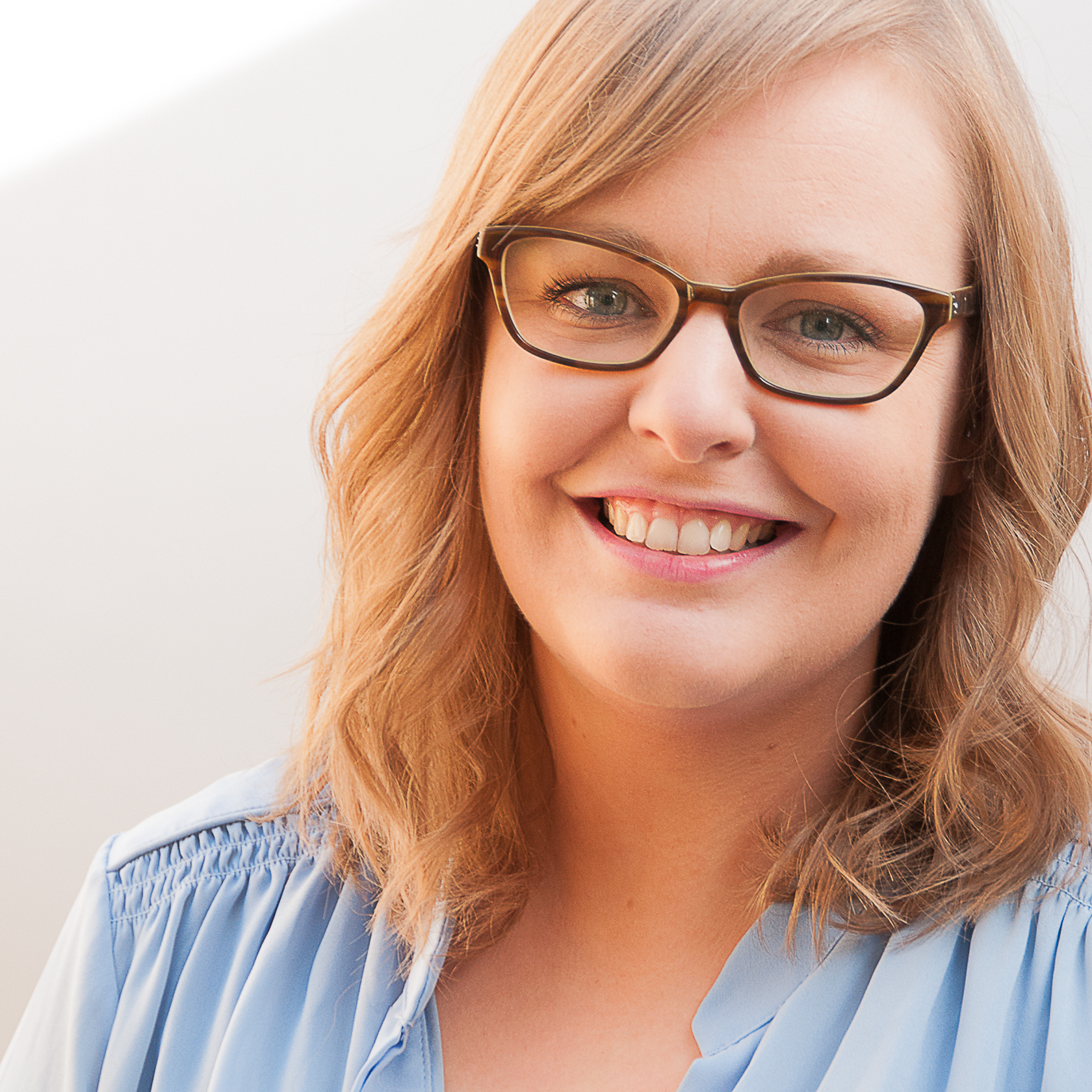
- Born: Dundalk, Ireland
- Education: Trinity College; University College, London
- Occupations: Physicist; Science writer
- Website: www.lauriewinkless.com

Laurie Winkless is a physicist and science writer. A contributor to Forbes Magazine, she has worked with schools and universities, the Royal Society, and The Naked Scientists.

Winkless was born in Dundalk, Ireland, to engineer father Jackie and theatre director mother Rosemary. She received her B.A. (mod) in Physics with Astrophysics from Trinity College Dublin, worked at NASA's Kennedy Space Center, then returned to school for her M.Sc. in Space Science from University College London. After completing her studies she worked in the Materials Team at the National Physical Laboratory for seven years, with a focus on thermoelectric energy harvesting. She researched the use of nanomaterials in the space industry for the European Space Agency.

While working on her PhD (which she did not complete) Winkless was physics news reporter for the BBC radio show and podcast The Naked Scientists. She then worked for the Nobel Foundation writing press releases and background material on Nobel laureates.

In 2016 she moved to New Zealand with her husband Richard Jackett, a New Zealander. She works in science communications, media training and other science journalism work.

Winkless' first book, Science and the City: The Mechanics Behind the Metropolis (2016), explains the science behind aspects of urban living, including skyscrapers and subways. The book came about after a publisher saw her Twitter account and approached Winkless for book ideas. Winkless refers to Science and the City as her "scientific love-letter to the great cities of the world."

Her second book, Sticky: The Secret Science of Surfaces (2021) is "about materials and the forces at play on their surfaces".
