= Air discography =

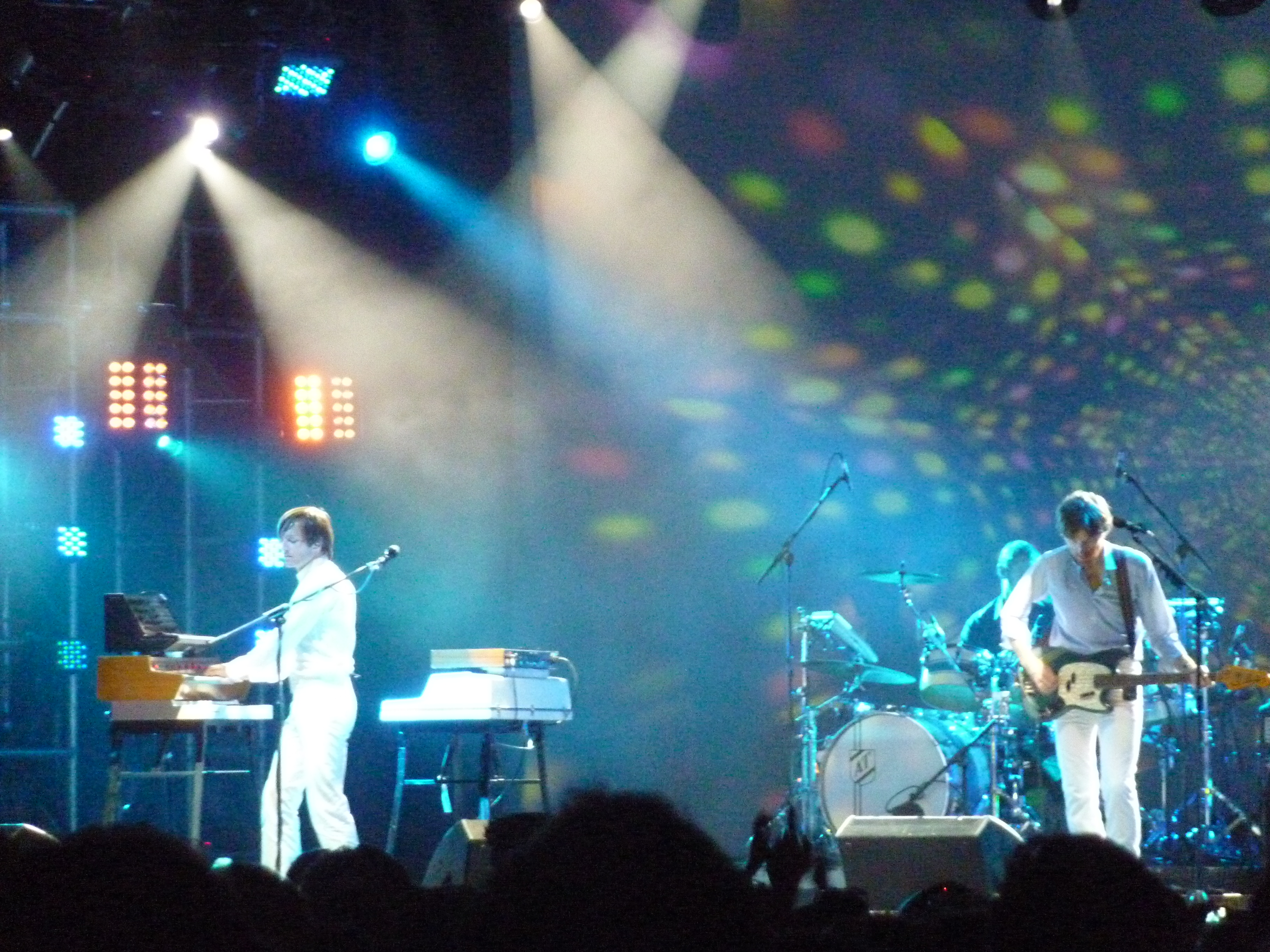
- Air performing in the central courtyard of Somerset House in 2010
- Studio albums: 6
- Extended plays: 1
- Soundtrack albums: 2
- Compilation albums: 1
- Singles: 22
- Video albums: 2
- Music videos: 16
- Mix albums: 1
- Remix albums: 1

French electronic music duo Air has released six studio albums, one collaborative studio album, two soundtrack albums, one mix album, one compilation album, one remix album, two video albums, one extended play, twenty-two singles and sixteen music videos. The band's first release was the 1995 single "Modular Mix", which peaked at number 177 in the United Kingdom. Their debut extended play, Premiers Symptômes, was released in July 1997; it peaked at number 12 in the UK and was certified silver by the British Phonographic Industry (BPI). Moon Safari, Air's debut studio album, was released in January 1998. It peaked at number 21 in France and was certified gold by the Syndicat National de l'Édition Phonographique (SNEP). Moon Safari reached the top ten in countries such as Ireland and the UK and produced three singles: "Sexy Boy", "Kelly Watch the Stars" and "All I Need". All three singles reached the top 40 in the UK; "Sexy Boy" and "All I Need" reached the top 25 in Finland and the Netherlands respectively.

In 1999, Air composed the score for the film The Virgin Suicides, and an accompanying album was released in February 2000. The album peaked at number 34 in France and was certified gold by the SNEP. "Playground Love", the album's only single, peaked at number 25 in the UK. The band's second studio album, 10 000 Hz Legend, was released in May 2001, peaking at number seven in France and charting highly in several European countries. 10 000 Hz Legend produced four singles: "Radio #1", which peaked at number 31 in the UK, "Don't Be Light", "How Does It Make You Feel?" and "People in the City". City Reading (Tre Storie Western), a collaboration with Italian writer Alessandro Baricco, was released in May 2003. Talkie Walkie followed in January 2004, peaking at number three in France. It became the band's first number-one album in Ireland and received a gold certification from the Irish Recorded Music Association (IRMA). The album's lead single, "Cherry Blossom Girl", became a top 15 hit in Finland and charted in several other European countries. Pocket Symphony, the band's fourth studio album, was released in March 2007, peaking at number eight in France and producing two singles: "Once Upon a Time" and "Mer du Japon".

In October 2009, Air released their fifth studio album, Love 2; it peaked at number 12 in France. The album produced three singles: "Do the Joy", "Sing Sang Sung", which charted in the Belgian region of Wallonia, and "So Light Is Her Footfall". Le voyage dans la lune, the band's sixth studio album, was released in February 2012. It peaked at number 17 in France and produced two singles: "Seven Stars" and "Parade", the latter of which charted in the Belgian region of Flanders.

== Albums ==
=== Studio albums ===
List of studio albums, with selected chart positions and certifications
Title	Details	Peak chart positions										Certifications
Title	Details	FRA	AUS	AUT	BEL (FL)	IRL	NLD	SCO	SWI	UK	US	Certifications
Moon Safari	Released: 16 January 1998; Label: Virgin; Formats: CD, cassette, LP	21	24	20	48	7	27	7	46	6	— (Note: Moon Safari did not enter the US Billboard 200, but peaked at number 41 on the US Heatseekers Albums Chart.)	SNEP: Gold; ARIA: Gold; BPI: 2× Platinum
10 000 Hz Legend	Released: 28 May 2001; Label: Virgin; Formats: CD, cassette, LP, digital download	7	13	7	8	14	54	11	11	7	88	BPI: Gold
Talkie Walkie	Released: 20 January 2004; Label: Virgin; Formats: CD, cassette, LP, digital download	3	18	15	2	1	17	2	4	2	61	BPI: Gold; IRMA: Gold
Pocket Symphony	Released: 5 March 2007; Label: Virgin; Formats: CD, LP, digital download	8	33	31	4	12	30	25	7	22	40	
Love 2	Released: 2 October 2009; Label: Virgin; Formats: CD, LP, digital download	12	58	56	15	30	43	43	15	36	100	
Le voyage dans la lune	Released: 6 February 2012; Label: Virgin; Formats: CD, LP, digital download	17	76	38	19	21	40	36	11	35	57	
"—" denotes a recording that did not chart or was not released in that territory.

==== Collaborative albums ====
List of collaborative studio albums
Title	Details
City Reading (Tre Storie Western) (with Alessandro Baricco)	Released: 25 March 2003; Label: Virgin; Formats: CD, cassette, LP

=== Soundtrack albums ===
List of soundtrack albums, with selected chart positions and certifications
Title	Details	Peak chart positions										Certifications
Title	Details	FRA	AUS	BEL (FL)	GER	IRL	NLD	SCO	SWI	UK	US	Certifications
The Virgin Suicides	Released: 23 February 2000; Label: Virgin; Formats: CD, cassette, LP	34	92	37	26	27	89	23	51	14	161	SNEP: Gold; BPI: Gold
Music for Museum	Released: 26 June 2014; Label: The Vinyl Factory; Formats: LP	—	—	—	—	—	—	—	—	—	—	
"—" denotes a recording that did not chart or was not released in that territory.

=== Mix albums ===
List of mix albums, with selected chart positions
Title	Details	Peak chart positions
Title	Details	US Dance
Late Night Tales: Air	Released: 11 September 2006; Label: Late Night Tales; Formats: CD, digital download	17

=== Compilation albums ===
List of compilation albums, with selected chart positions
Title	Details	Peak chart positions									
Title	Details	FRA	BEL (FL)	BEL (WA)	NLD	IRL	POR	SWI	UK	UK Dance	US Dance
Twentyears	Released: 10 June 2016; Label: Rhino, Parlophone; Formats: CD, LP, digital download	18	23	44	132	62	19	64	105	11	5

=== Remix albums ===
List of remix albums, with selected chart positions
Title	Details	Peak chart positions		
Title	Details	SCO	UK	US Dance
Everybody Hertz	Released: 18 February 2002; Label: Virgin; Formats: CD, LP, digital download	57	67	20

=== Video albums ===
List of video albums
Title	Details
Eating Sleeping Waiting and Playing: A Film About Air on Tour	Released: 13 December 1999; Label: Virgin; Formats: DVD, VHS
Videos	Released: 2002; Label: Source, Record Makers; Formats: DVD

== Extended plays ==
List of extended plays, with selected chart positions and certifications
Title	Details	Peak chart positions					Certifications
Title	Details	AUS	GER	SCO	UK	US Heat	Certifications
Premiers Symptômes	Released: 18 July 1997; Label: Source, Virgin; Formats: CD, cassette, LP	63	84	23	12	18	BPI: Gold

== Singles ==
List of singles, with selected chart positions, showing year released and album name
Title	Year	Peak chart positions										Certifications	Album
Title	Year	FRA	AUS	FIN	GER	ITA	NLD	SCO	SWI	UK	US Sales	Certifications	Album
"Modular Mix"	1995	—	—	—	—	—	—	—	—	177	—		Premiers Symptômes
"Casanova 70"	1996	—	—	—	—	—	—	—	—	— (Note: "Casanova 70" did not enter the UK Singles Chart, but peaked at number 25 on the UK Physical Chart.)	—		Premiers Symptômes
"Le soleil est près de moi"	1997	—	—	—	—	—	—	—	—	— (Note: "Le soleil est près de moi" did not enter the UK Singles Chart, but peaked at number 17 on the UK Physical Chart.)	—		Premiers Symptômes
"Californie"	1998	—	—	—	—	—	—	—	—	—	—		Premiers Symptômes
"Sexy Boy"	1998	65	68	— (Note: "Sexy Boy" did not enter the Official Finnish Charts' hittiälistalla chart, which measures radio and sales, but reached number 20 on the institution's sales-only singelista chart.)	—	—	—	11	—	13	—	BPI: Silver	Moon Safari
"Kelly Watch the Stars"	1998	—	77	—	—	—	—	18	—	18	—		Moon Safari
"All I Need"	1998	—	83	—	—	—	23	28	—	29	—	BPI: Silver	Moon Safari
"Playground Love"	2000	—	—	—	—	—	—	19	—	25	—		The Virgin Suicides
"Radio #1"	2001	—	—	30	—	29	—	34	98	31	—		10 000 Hz Legend
"Don't Be Light"	2002	—	—	—	—	—	—	—	—	—	—		10 000 Hz Legend
"How Does It Make You Feel?"	2002	—	—	—	—	—	—	—	—	—	—		10 000 Hz Legend
"People in the City"	2002	—	—	—	—	—	—	—	—	— (Note: "People in the City" did not enter the UK Singles Chart, but peaked at number 41 on the UK Physical Chart.)	—		10 000 Hz Legend
"Cherry Blossom Girl"	2004	80	—	15	80	23	90	—	—	174	73		Talkie Walkie
"Surfing on a Rocket"	2004	100	—	—	—	—	—	—	—	— (Note: "Surfing on a Rocket" did not enter the UK Singles Chart, but peaked at number 31 on the UK Physical Chart.)	48		Talkie Walkie
"Alpha Beta Gaga"	2004	—	—	—	—	—	98	52	—	44	—		Talkie Walkie
"Once Upon a Time"	2007	—	—	—	—	—	—	76	—	— (Note: "Once Upon a Time" did not enter the UK Singles Chart, but peaked at number 63 on the UK Physical Chart.)	—		Pocket Symphony
"Mer du Japon"	2007	—	—	—	—	—	—	—	—	—	—		Pocket Symphony
"Do the Joy"	2009	—	—	—	—	—	—	—	—	—	—		Love 2
"Sing Sang Sung"	2009	—	—	—	—	—	—	—	—	—	—		Love 2
"So Light Is Her Footfall"	2009	—	—	—	—	—	—	—	—	—	41		Love 2
"Seven Stars"	2012	—	—	—	—	—	—	—	—	—	—		Le voyage dans la lune
"Parade"	2012	—	—	—	—	—	—	—	—	—	—		Le voyage dans la lune
"—" denotes a recording that did not chart or was not released in that territory.

== Other certified songs ==
Title	Year	Certifications	Album
"La Femme d'argent"	1998	BPI: Silver	Moon Safari

== Other appearances ==
List of guest appearances, with other performing artists, showing year released and album name
Title	Year	Other artist(s)	Album
"Soldissimo" (EDC Remix)	1996	Étienne de Crécy	Super Discount
"Cosmic Bird"	1997	Jean-Jacques Perrey	Source Lab 3 Y
"Planet Vega"	2000	none	At Home with the Groovebox
"Dirty Trip" (live)	2002	none	Rarewerks, Vol. 2
"Alone in Kyoto"	2003	none	Lost in Translation soundtrack
"Il Secondo Giorno"	2006	none	Marie Antoinette soundtrack

=== Remix work ===
List of remix work for other artists, showing year released and album name
Title	Year	Other artist(s)	Album
"Latitudes" (Air Remix)	1996	Ollano	"Latitudes" single
"Me manquer (Londres en eté)"	1997	Étienne Daho	"Me manquer" single
"Purple" (La femme d'argent Mix)	1997	Crustation	"Purple" single
"Kootchi" (Air Remix)	1997	Neneh Cherry	Remixes
"Home" (Air "Around the Golf" Remix)	1997	Depeche Mode	"Home" single
"Gordini Mix" (Brakes On Mix)	1997	Alex Gopher	"Gordini Mix" single
"A Better Future" (Air Remix)	2002	David Bowie	Heathen
"Heaven Hammer"	2005	Beck	Guerolito

== Music videos ==
Title	Year	Director(s)
"Sexy Boy"	1998	Mike Mills
"Kelly Watch the Stars"	1998	Mike Mills
"All I Need"	1998	Mike Mills
"Le soleil est près de moi"	1999	Mike Mills
"Playground Love"	2000	Sofia Coppola, Roman Coppola
"Radio Number 1"	2001	Alex & Martin
"How Does It Make You Feel?"	2001	Antoine Bardou-Jacquet, Ludovic Houplain
"Don't Be Light"	2001	Jean-François Moriceau, Petra Mrzyk
"People in the City"	2002	Craig Champion
"Electronic Performers"	2004	Arnaud Ganzerli, Laurent Bourdoiseau, Jérôme Blanquet
"Cherry Blossom Girl"	2004	Kris Kramski
"Surfing on a Rocket"	2004	Antoine Bardou-Jacquet
"Alpha Beta Gaga"	2004	Mathieu Tonetti
"Once Upon a Time"	2007	Mathieu Tonetti
"Mer du Japon"	2007	Guillaume de la Perrière
"Sing Sang Sung"	2009	Petra Mrkyz, François Moriceau
"So Light As Her Footfall"	2010	Edouard Salier
"Painted Love"	2011	Christian Cantamessa
