= Twentyears =

2016 greatest hits album by Air

Greatest hits album by Air
- Released: 10 June 2016
- Recorded: 1997–2014
- Label: Airchology; Parlophone
- Producer: Air; Nigel Godrich

Air chronology
Music for Museum (2014)	Twentyears (2016)

Twentyears is a greatest hits album by French electronic music duo Air, released on 10 June 2016 by Airchology and Parlophone. The standard two-CD set contains a 17-track "best-of" disc and a second disc featuring 14 rarities, including two previously unreleased tracks, "Roger Song" and "Adis Abebah". A limited super deluxe edition box set, consisting of three CDs and two vinyl records, was released on 22 July 2016, including a third CD of remixes the duo have created for other artists.

== Track listing ==
Disc one All music composed by Jean-Benoît Dunckel and Nicolas Godin. All tracks produced by Air, except tracks 2, 6, 8, 13 and 15, which were produced by Air and Nigel Godrich, and track 12, which was produced by Godrich.
No.	Title	Writer(s)	Original album	Length
1.	"La femme d'argent"		Moon Safari, 1998	7:11
2.	"Cherry Blossom Girl"	Dunckel; Godin	Talkie Walkie, 2004	3:40
3.	"Kelly Watch the Stars"	Dunckel; Godin	Moon Safari, 1998	3:45
4.	"Playground Love" (with Gordon Tracks)	Thomas Mars	The Virgin Suicides, 2000	3:31
5.	"Sexy Boy"	Dunckel; Godin	Moon Safari, 1998	4:58
6.	"Venus"	Dunckel; Godin	Talkie Walkie, 2004	4:03
7.	"All I Need"	Beth Hirsch	Moon Safari, 1998	4:28
8.	"Alpha Beta Gaga" (single edit)		Talkie Walkie, 2004	3:02
9.	"Moon Fever"		Le voyage dans la lune, 2012	3:34
10.	"Don't Be Light"	Dunckel; Godin	10 000 Hz Legend, 2001	6:18
11.	"How Does It Make You Feel"	Dunckel; Godin	10 000 Hz Legend, 2001	4:37
12.	"Once Upon a Time"	Dunckel; Godin	Pocket Symphony, 2007	5:01
13.	"Alone in Kyoto"		Talkie Walkie, 2004	4:48
14.	"Talisman"		Moon Safari, 1998	4:16
15.	"Run"	Dunckel; Godin	Talkie Walkie, 2004	4:12
16.	"Le soleil est près de moi"	Dunckel; Godin	Premiers Symptômes, 1997	4:52
17.	"Land Me"		Music for Museum, 2014	4:35

Disc two All music composed by Dunckel and Godin, except track 6, which was composed by Peter Moesser, and track 13, which was composed by Jack Arel. All tracks produced by Air, except track 4, which was produced by Godrich, and tracks 11 and 13, which have no production credits.
No.	Title	Writer(s)	Previously released on	Length
1.	"Planet Vega"		At Home with the Groovebox, 1999	5:23
2.	"Flowerhead"		"Radio #1" single, 2001	5:36
3.	"Crickets"		Pocket Symphony iTunes and OpenDisc editions, 2007	3:32
4.	"The Duelist" (featuring Charlotte Gainsbourg and Jarvis Cocker)	Cocker	Pocket Symphony iTunes and OpenDisc editions, 2007	4:40
5.	"High Point"		"Once Upon a Time" single, 2007	4:03
6.	"Au fond du rêve doré"	Françoise Hardy	Love 2 iTunes edition, 2009	2:01
7.	"Danger Zone"	Dunckel; Godin	Love 2 iTunes edition, 2009	3:55
8.	"Indian Summer"		Love 2 iTunes edition, 2009	6:01
9.	"The Way You Look Tonight"	Dunckel; Godin	Everybody Hertz, 2002	3:44
10.	"Roger Song"		Previously unreleased	2:44
11.	"J'ai dormi sous l'eau" (BBC session, 1998)		Moon Safari 10th anniversary special edition, 2008	4:09
12.	"Remember" (David Withaker version)	Dunckel; Godin; Jean-Jacques Perrey	"Kelly Watch the Stars" single, 1998	2:21
13.	"Trente millions d'amis" (live at KCRW, 1998)		Moon Safari 10th anniversary special edition, 2008	4:33
14.	"Adis Abebah"	Dunckel; Godin	Previously unreleased; from the soundtrack of Quartier lointain	2:55

Disc three (of the super deluxe edition)
No.	Title	Writer(s)	Original artist	Length
1.	"Latitudes"	Xavier Jamaux; Marc Collin	Ollano	3:52
2.	"Purple" (La Femme d'argent Mix)	Ian Dark; Stig Manley; Bronagh Slevin; Mark Tayler	Crustation	3:07
3.	"Kootchi" (Air Remix)	Neneh Cherry; Cameron McVey; Simon Hopwood; Joakim Berg	Neneh Cherry	4:38
4.	"Home" (Air 'Around the Golf' Remix)	Martin L. Gore	Depeche Mode	3:55
5.	"A Better Future" (Remix by Air)	David Bowie	David Bowie	4:56
6.	"Heaven Hammer" (Missing Remixed by Air)	Beck Hansen; Dust Brothers; Vinicius de Moraes; Carlos Lyra	Beck	4:54
7.	"It's Working" (Air Remix)	Andrew VanWyngarden; Ben Goldwasser	MGMT	4:31
8.	"Nosferatu" (Remix by The Flower Pistols)		Air	3:26
9.	"Rock in the Rain"	Mark Ramos-Nishita	Money Mark	4:30

== Charts ==
Chart performance for Twentyears
Chart (2016)	Peak position
Belgian Albums (Ultratop Flanders)	23
Belgian Albums (Ultratop Wallonia)	44
Dutch Albums (Album Top 100)	132
French Albums (SNEP)	18
Irish Albums (IRMA)	62
Portuguese Albums (AFP)	19
Swiss Albums (Schweizer Hitparade)	64
UK Albums (OCC)	105
