= Beth Hirsch =

American singer-songwriter

- Born: October 18, 1967 (age 59)
- Origin: Tampa, Florida, United States
- Genre: Pop
- Years active: 1998–present
- Website: www.bethhirsch.com

Beth Hirsch (born October 18, 1967) is a singer-songwriter from Tampa, Florida. Hirsch is best known for her co-writing and vocals on "All I Need" and "You Make It Easy" with the Air Moon Safari album in 1998. Her first solo album, Early Days, was released in 1999, followed by Titles & Idols in 2001. After a series of collaborations with artists including Wasis Diop (Everything... Is Never Quite Enough) for the Original Film Soundtrack, "The Thomas Crowne Affair", with Pierce Brosnan, Jakatta (One Fine Day), D*Note (D*Votion '99), and Pale 3 (The Tunnel) on Tom Tykwer's Original Film Soundtrack, "The Princess & The Warrior", Hirsch released her third solo album Wholehearted, in 2007, and her fourth, L.I.F.E. - Love Is For Everyone, on October 26, 2020. Her EP After L.I.F.E. was released on December 13, 2020.

== Career ==
In November 1991, Hirsch moved to Paris to work as an au pair, where she became involved in the local bohemian artist community. It was in Paris where she discovered singing, thanks to architect, Scott Dimmit. She began her solo recording career with the EP Miner's Son, released in 1998. The EP was heard by Hirsch's neighbor, Nicolas Godin, and his musical partner in Air, Jean-Benoît Dunckel, with whom she collaborated on their Moon Safari album, co-writing and providing vocals on "All I Need" and "You Make It Easy".She toured with Air throughout Europe and the US before settling in London. Her second EP, P-Town Rubies, was released in 1999 on Dorado Records, an British independent label, which was followed by a UK tour with Terry Callier. Her collaboration with Wasis Diop, "Everything (Is Never Quite Enough)", from his 1998 Toxu album, appeared on the soundtrack of the remade The Thomas Crown Affair.

Hirsch's debut solo album, Early Days, was released in August 2000, with "Life Is Mine" taken from it as a single. The album received a four-star review from Esquire.

Her second album, Ken Downie and Custom Blue-produced Titles & Idols, was released in 2001 to generally positive reviews."Titles & Idols Review", AllMusic.

Her third album, the self-released Wholehearted (2007), received a four-star review from AllMusic.

Her fourth album, L.I.F.E. (Love Is For Everyone) was released in 2020 by Last Man Music.

Hirsch is a member of ASCAP and GEMA performance rights organizations.

== Discography ==
=== Albums ===
- Early Days (1999, Electric Bee Music)
- Titles & Idols (2001, Electric Bee Music)
- Wholehearted (2007, Electric Bee Music)
- Love Is For Everyone L.I.F.E 2.0 (2020, Last Man Music)

=== Singles and EPs ===
- "Miner's Son" (1998, Artefact/Electric Bee Music/Kwaidan)
- P-Town Rubies EP (1999, Kwaidan/Electric Bee Music)
- "Life Is Mine" (2000, Electric Bee Music)
- "Nest Sensation" (2001, Electric Bee Music)
- "Indelibly You" (2008, Electric Bee Music)
- "Something to Tell"/"So Many Things" (2010, Ho-Hum Records)
- "Confusion" (2012, Venus Recordings) (as AlfaBeth)
- "Let Him Go And Go To God" (2014, Venus Recordings) (as AlfaBeth)
- "Love Is For Everyone Part 1" (2014, Self-Raising Records)
- "Summer" (2015, Venus Recording) (as AlfaBeth)
- "Allison Something" (2020, Last Man Music)
- After L.I.F.E. EP (2021, Last Man Music)

=== Collaborations ===
- D*Note - D*Note (1997).
- Wasis Diop - Toxu (1998). Vocals on "Everything (...Is Never Quite Enough)"
- Air - Moon Safari (1998). Vocals on "All I Need" UK singles chart No.29, "You Make It Easy".
- Marc Collin - Les Kidnappeurs soundtrack (1998). Vocals on "Main Theme".
- Pale 3 - The Princess and the Warrior soundtrack (2000). Vocals on "The Tunnel".
- Fred Avril - "That Horse Must Be Starving" (2002). Vocals on "Helium Life Boat".
- Jakatta - Visions (2002). Vocals on "One Fine Day", UK singles chart No.39 (2003), "Home Away from You".
- Pale 3 - Crash (Music from and Inspired by the Film) (2005). Vocals on "Arrival".
- D*Note - Laguna (2006). Vocals on "Everybody Loves the Sunshine", "Wichita Lineman", "At Last I'm Free", "How Long", "Guinevere", "Edit and the Kingpin", "Then Along Came You", and "Being Alive".
- Various Artists - Café del Mar, vol.15 (2008). Vocals on "Under My Star", with Gelka.
- Billy Rivera - "21 Grief Street" (2011). Vocals on "Cold Corner".
- Rosita Kess - Northern Sky (2011). Vocals on "Northern Sky".
- Karmacoda - Eternal (2011). Vocals on "Love Will Turn Your Head Around".
- Solar Bears - Supermigration (2013). Vocals on "Our Future Is Underground".
- Bright Light Bright Light - "Make Me Believe In Hope (Blueprints Version)" (2013). Vocals on "Grace".
- The Willow - "In The Meanwhile" (2013). Vocals on "So Many Things".
- Karmacoda - "Love And Fate" (2015). Vocals on "All For Love", "We Don't Have A Lot Of Time" and "Message".
- Vincenzo Callea - "Protect You" (2015). Vocals.
- Cross & Quinn - "Cold Sky Blue" (2016). Vocals on "Cold Sky Blue".
- Sanxero - "Right Where You Are" (2016)(single). Vocals.
- Sleep Party People - "Lingering" (2017). Vocals on "We Are There Together".
- Lauren Canyon - "Lauren Canyon" (2017). Vocals on "Prom Queen".
- Grey Tropical - "Path Of Magic" (2017)(single). Vocals.
- Sanxero - "A Getaway" (2018)(single). Vocals.
- Eliot - "Let The Sun Rise" (2018)(single). Vocals.
- Session Victim - "Needledrop" (2020). Vocals on "Made Me Fly".
- Bright Light Bright Light - "Enjoy Youth" (2024). Vocals. UK Chart No.60.
- West 11 (Eleven) - Album "Atlantic Coast Highway" (2024). Vocals on all tracks.
