= Early Days =

Early Days or The Early Days may refer to:

== Magazine ==
- Early Days (journal), the annual journal of the Royal Western Australian Historical Society

== Music ==
- Early Days (The Zombies album), 1969
- Early Days (The Watersons album), 1994
- Early Days: The Best of Led Zeppelin Volume One, 1999
- Early Days (Beth Hirsch album), 2000
- The Early Days of Bonfire, 2004
- The History of Iron Maiden – Part 1: The Early Days, 2004 DVD
- "Early Days", 2013 song by Paul McCartney

== Art ==
- Early Days, a famous statue in San Francisco, California, USA

== Film ==
- Early Days (film), a 2025 Indian film
