= Sexy Boy (Air song) =

1998 single by Air

Single by Air

from the album Moon Safari
- B-side: "Jeanne"; "New Star in the Sky"
- Released: 9 February 1998
- Genre: Dream pop; electronica; downtempo
- Length: 4:57
- Label: Source; Virgin
- Songwriter: Air
- Producer: Air

Air singles chronology
"Californie" (1998)	"Sexy Boy" (1998)	"Kelly Watch the Stars" (1998)

Music video
- "Sexy Boy" on YouTube

"Sexy Boy" is a song by French music duo Air, released in February 1998 by Virgin Records as the first single from the duo's first album, Moon Safari (1998). It peaked at number 13 on the UK Singles Chart and number 22 on the US Billboard Dance Club Play chart. The single was also a top-20 hit in Finland and a top-30 hit in Iceland.

== Background ==
Nicolas Godin said that the song "almost didn’t make it to the album. It’s not like the rest of the tracks — it has a verse and chorus. We didn’t know what to do with it, because we didn't know how to include it inside the rest of the music, which is more mellow and atmospheric. This track is more upbeat. It didn't sound like the rest of the album. At the end, it was the biggest track on the record, which is very strange."

The “woman's voice” is Jean-Benoît Dunckel, electronically treated—especially through a Leslie—with possible layered contribution from Nicolas Godin. (Beth Hirsch, who appears on the album, did not perform on “Sexy Boy.”

Speaking about the song's meaning, Jean-Benoît Dunckel said:

"Sexy Boy" is a seduction song, and it's about how heterosexual men can be happy to look at other men because they want to check they are dressed. It's more about a fashion thing. "OK, we are men, and we want to look sexy for the girls, and anybody else." It's about this taboo idea that men can be erotic too. It's not about homosexuality or heterosexuality — it’s about looking good. Men, too, like to be well-dressed. They like to be looked at, and to be paid attention to the way they look when it comes to the clothing that they wear. In 1998, it was taboo to speak about men’s sexuality. "Sexy Boy" is not a very male-attitude song, it’s a bit borderline, and it creates a strange feeling. We liked that.

== Critical reception ==
Kevin Courtney from Irish Times named "Sexy Boy" Single of the Week, writing, "How can you not be seduced by that title? The new single from the cool-as French duo is a swooping, moog-driven slice of fromage, filled with polyester passion and gender-bending vocals." A reviewer from Music Week gave it five out of five, noting that the song is "uncharacteristically uptempo with its vocodered lyrics and driving Roxy Music/Bowie/ELO sensibility." John Mulvey of NME praised Air's "sensitive but tenacious grasp of melody, a laid-back disposition and a reckless way with a Vocoder that makes them unafraid of sounding like a digital ELO", while also noting similarities to Garbage. Andy Beevers from Record Mirror Dance Update also rated it five out of five, naming it "by no means the highlight" of the album, and "the least downtempo track and therefore a sensible choice for the French duo's first major label single." He also described it as "charmingly kitsch". Sunday Mirror rated the song ten out of ten, writing, "Dotty french duo come up with the best single of the year so far. Sounds like Kraftwerk meeting Daft Punk and going for a picnic with Aqua."

== Music video ==
The accompanying music video for "Sexy Boy", directed by American film and music video director Mike Mills, shows the members of Air in New York City. They see a toy monkey on the street and immediately enter a fantasy in which the monkey is a giant and flies off to the Moon. Meanwhile, the members of Air are still in New York and other people see them playing with the toy monkey around the United Nations headquarters and in Central Park. The fantasy scenes are shown in colorful animation and the scenes in real life are shot in black-and-white live action. The music video played frequently on JBTV.

== Track listings ==
- US CD single
1. "Sexy Boy" (radio edit) – 3:51
2. "Sexy Boy" (Sex Kino Mix by Beck) – 6:33
3. "Sexy Boy" (Cassius Radio Mix) – 4:33
4. "Sexy Boy" (Étienne de Crécy & the Flower Pistols remix) – 4:57
5. "Jeanne" (with Françoise Hardy) – 4:24
- UK CD single
1. "Sexy Boy" (radio edit) – 3:51
2. "Sexy Boy" (Cassius Radio Mix) – 4:33
3. "Sexy Boy" (Étienne de Crécy & the Flower Pistols remix) – 4:57
4. "Jeanne" (with Françoise Hardy) – 4:24
- French CD single
1. "Sexy Boy" (radio edit) – 3:51
2. "New Star in the Sky (Chanson Pour Soleil)" – 5:38

== Charts ==
=== Weekly charts ===
Weekly chart performance for "Sexy Boy"
Chart (1998)	Peak position
Australia (ARIA)	68
Belgium (Ultratip Bubbling Under Flanders)	11
Europe (Eurochart Hot 100)	32
Finland (Suomen virallinen lista)	20
France (SNEP)	65
Iceland (Íslenski Listinn Topp 40)	27
Scottish Singles Sales (Official Charts)	11
UK Singles (Official Charts)	13
US Dance Singles Sales (Billboard)	22

=== Year-end charts ===
Year-end chart performance for "Sexy Boy"
Chart (1998)	Rank
Europe Border Breakers (Music & Media)	34

== Certifications ==
Certifications for "Sexy Boy"
Region	Certification	Certified units/sales
United Kingdom (BPI)	Silver	200,000^{‡}
^{‡} Sales+streaming figures based on certification alone.

== Release history ==
Release dates and formats for "Sexy Boy"
Region	Date	Format(s)	Label(s)	Ref.
United Kingdom	9 February 1998	12-inch vinyl; CD; cassette	Source; Virgin	
United States	16 February 1998	Alternative radio	Source; Caroline	

== Covers ==
The Kinky Boyz (feat. Kia) covered "Sexy Boy" in 1999 and this version was used in the UK TV series Queer as Folk also from 1999. Former Chemlab vocalist Jared Louche covered "Sexy Boy" with The Aliens for his 1999 solo debut Covergirl. The song was later covered by Franz Ferdinand and appears as a B-side to the single "Walk Away". "Sexy Boy" was also covered by German artist Nena on her 2007 cover album Cover Me. It was also covered by the French group Plastiscines on their 2014 album Back to the Start.

A newly scored orchestral version of the track was released in December 2010, under the artist "The Fallen Angels". The orchestra and choir arrangement was created by composer Roger Neill, who has been a long-time collaborator with Air since his extensive work on their 2001 album 10,000 Hz Legend. This version of the track is featured in a television advertising campaign for Lynx in the UK and Axe in the US and Europe.

== In popular culture ==
The song appears in the 1999 film 10 Things I Hate About You, playing during the scene where characters decide to sabotage an upcoming party. It also appears in the 2026 film Girls Like Girls.
