= Solar Bears =

Solar Bears may refer to:

- Solar Bears (musical duo), an Irish electronic music duo
- Orlando Solar Bears (IHL), an ice hockey team in the IHL
- Orlando Solar Bears (ECHL), an ice hockey team in the ECHL
