= City Reading (Tre Storie Western) =

Studio album by Air and Baricco
- Released: 25 March 2003
- Genre: Spoken word; progressive rock
- Label: Astralwerks
- Producer: Nigel Godrich

Professional ratings
Review scores
Source	Rating
Pitchfork	(4.4/10)

City Reading (Tre Storie Western) is a 2003 album by the French duo Air in collaboration with the Italian writer Alessandro Baricco. In this album, Baricco narrates some passages from his novel City with Air's music in the background. The impetus for the album was in 2001, when Air performed background music to a live theater reading of City at the request of Baricco. The following month, they recorded three excerpts from his book: Bird (track 1), La Puttana Di Closingtown (tracks 2–10) and Caccia All'Uomo (tracks 11–19). The album was mixed by Radiohead producer Nigel Godrich.

== Track listing ==
All lyrics are written by Alessandro Baricco; all music is composed by Jean-Benoît Dunckel and Nicolas Godin.

Bird
No.	Title	Length
1.	"Bird"	7:20

La puttana di Closingtown
No.	Title	Length
2.	"Prologo per La puttana di Closingtown"	2:40
3.	"Se vuoi capire la loro storia"	1:04
4.	"Pat Cobhan Ride"	4:13
5.	"Fanny scivola con le labbra"	2:00
6.	"Pat Cobhan alza gli occhi"	1:23
7.	"Young"	2:35
8.	"'Affanculo"	4:12
9.	"Quell'uomo bara, dice"	1:38
10.	"Finale"	1:35

Caccia all'uomo
No.	Title	Length
11.	"Prologo"	3:20
12.	"Il primo giorno"	3:39
13.	"Il secondo giorno"	4:57
14.	"Il terzo giorno"	5:34
15.	"L'urlo"	1:16
16.	"Mondo sparito"	0:54
17.	"Il quarto giorno"	4:20
18.	"Macchie di sangue"	1:12
19.	"Musica"	3:07
