= Everybody Hurts (disambiguation) =

"Everybody Hurts" is a 1993 song by R.E.M.

Everybody Hurts may also refer to:

- "Everybody Hurts" (The Sopranos), the sixth episode of the series' fourth season
- "Everybody Hurts", a song by Avril Lavigne from her 2011 album Goodbye Lullaby

== See also ==
- Everybody Hertz, a 2002 remix album by French music duo Air
