= Kelly Watch the Stars =

Single by Air

from the album Moon Safari
- B-side: "Remember"
- Released: 4 May 1998
- Recorded: 1997
- Genre: Pop; ambient pop; downtempo; electronica
- Length: 3:44
- Label: Source; Virgin
- Songwriters: Jean-Benoît Dunckel; Nicolas Godin
- Producers: Jean-Benoît Dunckel; Nicolas Godin

Air singles chronology
"Sexy Boy" (1998)	"Kelly Watch the Stars" (1998)	"All I Need" (1998)

"Kelly Watch the Stars" (also written "Kelly, Watch the Stars!") is a song by French electronic music duo Air from their debut studio album, Moon Safari (1998). It was released on 4 May 1998 as the album's second single.

== Background ==
"Kelly Watch the Stars" was inspired by the Charlie's Angels character Kelly Garrett, played by Jaclyn Smith. "It's a silly song. But you need silly songs to make good records," explained Nicolas Godin in 2019. "It's about Jaclyn Smith, Kelly from Charlie's Angels. Me and JB are really in love with her. It was our first sexual shock when we were kids. I remember talking about who we thought was the most beautiful woman in the world. For me, it was Kelly, so we wrote 'Kelly Watch the Stars' about her."

The only lyrics in the song are the title. As Jean-Benoît Dunckel explained: "Unlike American or British bands, we weren't always thinking “verse-chorus”. And singing in English made us sound even more French, because of our thick accents."

== Critical reception ==
The song was well-received by music critics. AllMusic called the song "accessible pop." Drum 'n' Bass: The Rough Guide described the song as "retro-electronics". The song was also included in the book 1001 Albums You Must Hear Before You Die.

== Chart performance ==
The song was commercially successful in the United Kingdom, entering the UK Singles Chart at number 18 on the chart dated 16 May 1998 and spending a total of three weeks in the top 50. The song remains Air's second highest-peaking single in the UK.

== Music video ==
The music video, directed by Mike Mills, drew attention due to its surreal concept. It depicts a girl named Kelly playing table tennis. She is knocked unconscious and floats into the night sky, but eventually regains consciousness, continues playing, and wins the match. Meanwhile, the members of Air seem to be simulating her game while playing Pong on a TV.

Keeping with the Charlie's Angels theme, the names on the scorecards are 'Kelly' (Kelly Garrett) and 'Smith' (Jaclyn Smith, who played Kelly on the show).

== Live performances and media usage ==
The group performed the song on Jimmy Kimmel Live! in 2016, to promote the release of their retrospective collection Twentyears.

A remix of the song was featured on the soundtrack for the 1999 film Splendor. The song was also featured on the 2012 electronica retrospective collection "Electrospective". The song was also featured in an episode of TV shows Daria and Back in Time for Dinner. It's also used as the title music for Arte TV show Invitation au Voyage.

== Track listings ==
- French CD single
1. "Kelly Watch the Stars" (edit) – 3:39
2. "Remember" (Version Cordes) – 2:21
- French CD maxi single and Australian CD single
1. "Kelly Watch the Stars" (edit) – 3:39
2. "Sexy Boy" (Sex Kino Mix) – 6:33
3. "Kelly, Watch the Stars!" (album version) – 3:44
4. "Remember" (D. Whitaker Version) – 2:21
- French 7-inch single

A. "Kelly Watch the Stars" (American Girls Remix par Phoenix)
B. "Kelly Watch the Stars" (Remix par Moog Cookbook)

- 12-inch single

A1. "Kelly Watch the Stars" (edit) – 3:39
A2. "Sexy Boy" (Sex Kino Mix) – 6:33
B1. "Kelly Watch the Stars" (extended version) – 8:12
B2. "Remember" (D. Whitaker Version) – 2:21

- UK cassette single
- Same tracks on both sides
1. "Kelly Watch the Stars" (edit) – 3:39
2. "Sexy Boy (Sex Kino Mix) – 6:33
3. "Kelly, Watch the Stars!" (album version) – 3:44

== Charts ==
Weekly chart performance for "Kelly Watch the Stars"
Chart (1998)	Peak position
Australia (ARIA)	77
Belgium (Ultratip Bubbling Under Flanders)	12
Scottish Singles Sales (Official Charts)	18
UK Singles (Official Charts)	18

Annual chart rankings for "Kelly Watch the Stars"
Chart (1998)	Rank
Europe Border Breakers (Music & Media)	29
