= Marie Antoinette (soundtrack) =

Marie Antoinette: Original Motion Picture Soundtrack

Soundtrack album by various artists
- Released: October 10, 2006
- Genres: New wave; post-punk
- Length: 91:02
- Labels: Verve Forecast; Polydor
- Producer: Brian Reitzell

Professional ratings
Review scores
Source	Rating
AllMusic	4/5 stars
Empire	5/5 stars

Marie Antoinette: Original Motion Picture Soundtrack is the soundtrack album to the 2006 historical drama film Marie Antoinette. It was released on October 10, 2006, by Verve Forecast Records and Polydor Records. The soundtrack is composed heavily of atmospheric guitar-based rock music and electronic music, a trend established in previous Coppola films such as Lost in Translation and The Virgin Suicides, which were also produced by music director Brian Reitzell.

While the film itself is set in 18th-century France, the bulk of the soundtrack consists of 1980s new wave and post-punk artists such as Siouxsie and the Banshees, New Order, The Cure, and Bow Wow Wow. The soundtrack also contains several period baroque pieces, including works by François Couperin, Antonio Vivaldi, Jean-Philippe Rameau, and Domenico Scarlatti.

The limited-edition vinyl version has album art by Elizabeth Peyton. Roger Neill served as a historic music consultant on the film.

== Reception ==
The album debuted at number 154 on the US Billboard 200. In its second week, it jumped to number 97.

It was nominated for Best Soundtrack at the 12th Critics' Choice Awards.

In 2013, the album was listed among twenty decade-defining soundtracks of the 2000s by Empire magazine.

== Track listing ==
Disc one
No.	Title	Writer(s)	Artist	Length
1.	"Hong Kong Garden" (with strings intro)	Kenny Morris, John McKay, Steven Severin, Siouxsie Sioux	Siouxsie and the Banshees	3:10
2.	"Aphrodisiac"	Matthew Ashman, Dave Barbarossa, Leigh Gorman, Annabella Lwin, Malcolm McLaren	Bow Wow Wow	2:57
3.	"What Ever Happened?"	Julian Casablancas	The Strokes	2:48
4.	"Pulling Our Weight"	Johan Duncanson, Martin Larsson	The Radio Dept.	3:21
5.	"Ceremony"	Ian Curtis, Peter Hook, Stephen Morris, Bernard Sumner	New Order	4:22
6.	"Natural's Not in It"	Hugo Burnham, Andrew Gill, Jon King	Gang of Four	3:06
7.	"I Want Candy" (Kevin Shields remix)	Bert Berns, Bob Feldman, Jerry Goldstein /Richard Gottehrer	Bow Wow Wow	2:39
8.	"Kings of the Wild Frontier"	Adam Ant, Marco Pirroni	Adam and the Ants	3:56
9.	"Concerto in G" (from "Concerto for Strings and Continuo in G major" RV 151 Concerto alla rustica: I presto)	Antonio Vivaldi	Roger Neill	2:31
10.	"The Melody of a Fallen Tree"	Dan Matz, Jason McNeely	Windsor for the Derby	8:16
11.	"I Don't Like It Like This"	Johan Duncanson	The Radio Dept.	4:08
12.	"Plainsong"	Robert Smith, Simon Gallup, Roger O'Donnell, Laurence Tolhurst, Boris Williams	The Cure	5:08

Disc two
No.	Title	Writer(s)	Artist	Length
1.	"Intro Versailles"			0:37
2.	"Jynweythek Ylow"	Aphex Twin	Aphex Twin	2:35
3.	"Opus 17"	Dustin O'Halloran	Dustin O'Halloran	2:03
4.	"Il Secondo Giorno" (instrumental)	Jean-Benoît Dunckel, Nicolas Godin	Air	4:57
5.	"Keen On Boys"	Johan Duncanson, Martin Larsson	The Radio Dept.	4:49
6.	"Opus 23"	Dustin O'Halloran	Dustin O'Halloran	3:08
7.	"Les barricades mystérieuses"	François Couperin	Patricia Mabee	2:35
8.	"Fools Rush In" (Kevin Shields remix)	Rube Bloom, Johnny Mercer	Bow Wow Wow	2:19
9.	"Avril 14th"	Aphex Twin	Aphex Twin	1:58
10.	"K. 213"	Domenico Scarlatti	Patricia Mabee	4:22
11.	"Tommib Help Buss"	Tom Jenkinson	Squarepusher	2:10
12.	"Tristes apprêts, pâles flambeaux" (from Castor et Pollux RCT 32, Act I, Scene III: Air de Télaïre)	Jean Philippe Rameau	Agnès Mellon, William Christie and Les Arts Florissants	5:54
13.	"Opus 36"	Dustin O'Halloran	Dustin O'Halloran	1:45
14.	"All Cats Are Grey"	Robert Smith, Simon Gallup, Laurence Tolhurst	The Cure	5:23

== Charts ==
Chart (2006–07)	Peak position
Danish Albums (Hitlisten)	37
French Albums (SNEP)	163
UK Soundtrack Albums (Official Charts)	10
US Billboard 200	97
US Soundtrack Albums (Billboard)	6
