= Supermigration =

Studio album by Solar Bears
- Released: 15 April 2013
- Genre: Progressive electronic, indietronica
- Length: 39:24
- Label: Planet Mu

Harmonia chronology
She Was Coloured In (2010)	Supermigration (2013)	Advancement (2016)

Professional ratings
Aggregate scores
Source	Rating
Metacritic	71/100
Review scores
Source	Rating
Beats per Minute	69%
Clash	6/10
Exclaim!	6/10
musicOMH	4/5 stars
NME	6/10
Pitchfork Media	7.2/10
Popmatters	6/10
State	4/5 stars
Under the Radar	7/10 stars
XLR8R	7/10

Supermigration is the second studio album by Irish electronic duo Solar Bears. It was released in April 2013 under Planet Mu Records.

== Track list ==
No.	Title	Length
1.	"Stasis"	1:09
2.	"Cosmic Runner"	4:03
3.	"Alpha People" (Featuring Keep Shelly in Athens)	3:01
4.	"Love Is All"	3:05
5.	"The Girl That Played With Light"
6.	"You and Me" (Featuring Subterranean Cycles)	2:24
7.	"Komplex"	4:20
8.	"Our Future is Underground" (Featuring Beth Hirsch)	3:38
9.	"A Sky Darkly"	3:08
10.	"Rising High"	1:42
11.	"Happiness is a Warm Spacestation"	6:00
12.	"Rainbow Collision"	2:56
