= Darkel =

Studio album by Darkel
- Released: 18 September 2006
- Genre: Alternative rock, electronica
- Length: 46:11
- Label: Source Records, Astralwerks
- Producer: Darkel

Darkel chronology
Darkel (2006)	Man of Sorrow (2015)

Professional ratings
Aggregate scores
Source	Rating
Metacritic	55/100
Review scores
Source	Rating
The A.V. Club	C
Allmusic	3.5/5 stars
Gigwise	3.5/5 stars
The Guardian	2/5 stars
MusicOMH	2/5 stars
The Observer	3/5 stars
Pitchfork	4.7/10
Popmatters	4/10
Prefix Magazine	8/10

Darkel is the debut solo studio album by French musician Darkel (Jean-Benoît Dunckel), one half of the French electronica band Air. It was released in September 2006 (see 2006 in music).

== Critical reception ==
Darkel was met with "mixed or average" reviews from critics. At Metacritic, which assigns a weighted average rating out of 100 to reviews from mainstream publications, this release received an average score of 55 based on 18 reviews.

In a review for AllMusic, critic reviewer Heather Phares wrote: "Darkel doesn't differ greatly from his work with Air - it's got the same mix of epic synth passages and sexy, starry-eyed pop, and his wispy, almost androgynous voice would be unmistakable in almost any setting. Sometimes Darkel seems in danger of floating away on its flights of fancy, suggesting that Godin gives some of Dunckel's more whimsical ideas some grounding when they work together as Air." Dorian Lynskey at The Guardian said: "Without his band's usual deep-pile arrangements, these twinkling melodies and synth-prog twiddles sound rather insubstantial; TV Destroy is tinselly new wave that would struggle to destroy a teabag." At Pitchfork, Marc Hogan explained: "While several of the songs evoke the woozy romance of Air's slower tracks, the usual aplomb of Dunckel's day job is lacking, so many fans may want to hold out for the new Air album due next year."

== Track listing ==
All tracks are written by Jean-Benoît Dunckel except where noted.

Darkel track listing
No.	Title	Writer(s)	Length
1.	"Be My Friend"	Jean-Benoît Dunckel; Euston Jones	4:16
2.	"At the End of the Sky"	Dunckel; Jones	4:12
3.	"TV Destroy"	Dunckel	3:10
4.	"Some Men"	Dunckel	4:09
5.	"My Own Sun"	Dunckel; Jones	3:40
6.	"Pearl"	Dunckel	4:07
7.	"Earth"	Dunckel	6:37
8.	"Beautiful Woman"	Dunckel	2:40
9.	"How Brave You Are"	Dunckel; Jones	4:28
10.	"Bathroom Spirit"	Dunckel	6:52

== Single ==
At the End of the Sky was released as a single with two additional tracks.

1. "At the End of the Sky" – 4:12
2. "Bunny Girl" – 4:37
3. "Stay" – 3:01

== Personnel ==
- Stephane "Alf" Briat – Mixing
- Alex Gopher – Mastering
- Laurent Griffon – Bass, Guitar
- Earl Harvin – Drums
- Hi-Five – Cover Art
- Dayan Korolic – Bass
- Anthony Mccann – Photography
- Valérie Sonnier – Cover Photo

== Release details ==
Country	Date	Label	Format	Catalog
United Kingdom	18 September 2006	EMI, Source	LP	3666201 / 0 0946 366620 1
United Kingdom	18 September 2006	EMI, Source	CD digipak	3666202 / 0 0946 366620 2 2
United Kingdom	18 September 2006	EMI, Source	CD	3728912 / 0 0946 372891 2 9
United States	19 September 2006	Astralwerks	LP	ASW-66620 / 0946 3 66620 1
United States	19 September 2006	Astralwerks	CD	ASW-72891 / 0946 3 72891 2 9
