= Roger Neill =

American musician (born 1963)

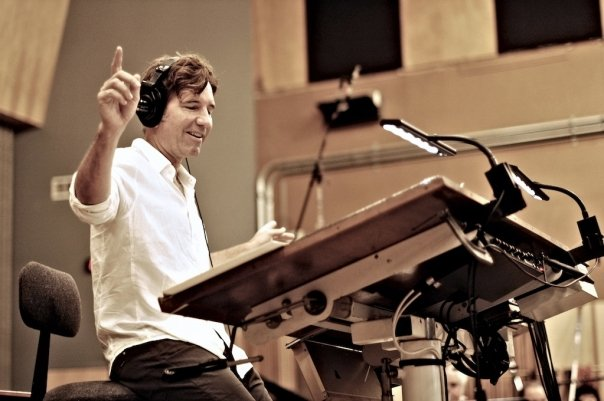
- Roger Neill conducting at the Newman Scoring Stage
- Born: December 26, 1963 (age 62); San Diego, California, U.S.
- Education: University of Southern California Harvard University
- Occupations: Film composer, Television composer, conductor, arranger
- Website: rogerneill.com

Roger Neill (born December 26, 1963) is an American composer, arranger, orchestrator, conductor, guitarist and educator. He is best known for his scores for the films 20th Century Women, Don't Think Twice, and Beginners. Notable television scores include the series Mozart In The Jungle and King of the Hill. Neill has created orchestral arrangements for many recording artists, such as the French band AIR, for their album 10 000 Hz Legend, and in concert. In the theater world, Neill is best known for the controversial musical The Beastly Bombing, or A Terrible Tale of Terrorists Tamed by the Tangle of True Love.

== Early life ==
Roger Neill was born in San Diego, California, and spent his formative years in the neighboring city of El Cajon. By his early teens he was accomplished on flute, piano and guitar. He graduated from Grossmont High School in 1982. Neill was accepted into the USC Thornton School of Music as a flutist, but quickly turned to composition as his main focus, studying with composer Morten Lauridsen, among others. At USC he had his first experiences in film scoring, collaborating with student filmmakers at the adjacent USC School of Cinematic Arts, and attending classes by composer David Raksin.

== Education ==
While attending the Aspen Center for Compositional Studies, Neill encountered faculty member Earl Kim, who invited him to pursue graduate studies in music at Harvard University. Neill earned a Master of Music degree in 1990, and a Ph.D in 1994.

At Harvard, Neill studied with Kim, along with Pulitzer Prize winners Donald Martino and Bernard Rands. He also received tutelage from visiting professors Milton Babbitt and John Cage. Neill studied conducting with Harold Farberman at the Conductors' Institute. Coursework at Harvard with notable ethnomusicologist Bruno Nettl led to a research grant to study Taarab music and Swahili culture in conjunction with the Institute of Kiswahili and Foreign Languages in Zanzibar, Tanzania. Neill also studied at The Goethe-Institut in West Berlin in 1990 at the invitation of the West German government through a DAAD grant.

While a student at Harvard, Neill received the BMI Pete Carpenter Fellowship in 1991, which provided him the means to re-locate to Los Angeles and begin his professional career.

== Scoring career ==
Neill began a professional relationship with veteran television composer Mike Post that led to his first television scoring credits: the Stephan J. Cannell series Silk Stalkings (with fellow Mike Post stablemate Danny Lux), and Renegade.

As an independent composer, Neill scored the Fox primetime animated sitcom King of the Hill beginning in 1997, and was the series's primary composer for its thirteen-season run. In 1998, Neill was presented with a BMI TV Music Award for his score work on the show. In 2007, King of the Hill was named by Time magazine as one of the top 100 greatest television shows of all time.

Neill's other notable television credits include Chicago Hope, Michael Hayes, Roughnecks, and The Simple Life (for which Neill won an ASCAP Award for his bluegrass-tinged score). Starting in 2014, Neill has been music consultant for Chuck Lorre's Emmy Award winning comedy series, Mom.

For the Amazon Studios series Mozart in the Jungle, Neill acted as composer, music producer and script consultant. Amazon subsequently released the soundtrack album for Mozart in the Jungle, which features Neill's orchestral reimagination of Phoenix's "Lisztomania", the series's main title. In 2016, Mozart in the Jungle won two Golden Globes and an Emmy, including the Golden Globe for Best Television Series – Musical or Comedy.

Neill's distinguished feature film scores include Mike Birbiglia's critically acclaimed Don't Think Twice which premiered at the 2016 SXSW Film Festival, and Mike Mills's 20th Century Women, which premiered as the Centerpiece of the 2016 New York Film Festival. The score for 20th Century Women is notable for its use of late-70s electronic instruments and sounds. Neill also scored Mills's 2010 Academy Award winning film, Beginners, with composers Brian Reitzell and Dave Palmer.

Other feature films include Macky Alston's documentary The Killer Within, featuring the renowned Kronos Quartet, Sofia Coppola's Marie-Antoinette, Roman Coppola's films C.Q., A Glimpse Inside The Mind of Charles Swann III, and Silas Howard's film A Kid Like Jake, starring Jim Parsons., and Reed Harkness' multi decade documentary "Sam Now".

Like Father (2019), a film for Netflix starring Kristen Bell, Kelsey Grammer and Seth Rogen, features Neill's Hawaiian-style slack-key guitar playing.

Valley Girl (2020), from MGM Studios, is a remake of the Nicolas Cage cult classic, re-done as a musical.

Neill has collaborated frequently with NPR radio personality Ira Glass, for the series This American Life and elsewhere. Neill provided the music for Glass's Google Doodle project, presented on Valentine's Day 2014.

Roger Neill has composed extensively for commercial advertisement. Much of his ad work has been in collaboration with distinguished film directors, including Kathryn Bigelow, Roman Coppola, Mike Mills, Rupert Sanders, Gus Van Sant, and Angus Wall.

Roger Neill was invited to join the Academy of Motion Picture Arts and Sciences in 2020.

== The Beastly Bombing ==
Neill's controversial musical The Beastly Bombing or A Terrible Tale of Terrorists Tamed by the Tangle of True Love was written with librettist Julien Nitzberg and premiered in 2006. The Beastly Bombing drew comparison to Mel Brooks and was dubbed by The Huffington Post: "the first great work of comedy to emerge from the post-9/11 little planet of horrors." The play also had its detractors. Stephen Schwartz, the composer of Wicked and Godspell, called The Beastly Bombing "the most offensive and morally unredeemable musical I've ever heard." At the prestigious LA Weekly Theater Awards, The Beastly Bombing won the Musical of the Year Award. Productions of The Beastly Bombing has been mounted in Los Angeles, New York, Chicago and Amsterdam.

== Teaching ==
Neill has been active as a teacher and lecturer throughout his professional career. He has taught at UCLA Extension, and at Cal Poly Pomona as visiting faculty in the music department. Alongside composer Larry Groupé, Neill is co-founder of the Palomar Film Music Workshop which meets yearly in the Pauma Valley in San Diego County.
