= Le voyage dans la lune (album) =

2012 studio album by Air

Studio album by Air
- Released: 6 February 2012
- Genre: Space rock
- Length: 32:08
- Label: Virgin
- Producer: Air

Air chronology
Love 2 (2009)	Le voyage dans la lune (2012)	Music for Museum (2014)

Singles from Le voyage dans la lune
- 1. "Parade" Released: 16 December 2011; 2. "Seven Stars" Released: 6 January 2012

Professional ratings
Aggregate scores
Source	Rating
AnyDecentMusic?	6.4/10
Metacritic	70/100
Review scores
Source	Rating
AllMusic	4/5 stars
Alternative Press	4/5 stars
The A.V. Club	B
Entertainment Weekly	A
The Guardian	3/5 stars
The Independent	3/5 stars
Mixmag	4/5
Pitchfork	5.7/10
Rolling Stone	3/5 stars
Spin	8/10

Le voyage dans la lune (English: A Trip to the Moon) is the sixth studio album by French electronic music duo Air, released on 6 February 2012 by Virgin Records.

== Background and release ==
The album is inspired by the 1902 silent science fiction film A Trip to the Moon (Le voyage dans la lune) by Georges Méliès and is intended to be a soundtrack to the restored version of the film. A free three-minute film excerpt featuring the song "Sonic Armada" was made available for one week in early December 2011 in conjunction with a pre-order offer. A limited edition of the album (70,000 copies worldwide) includes the CD and a DVD of the film. The digital version of the album, along with the newly restored and colourised 16-minute film, was released as a strictly limited edition.

== Track listing ==
All music is composed by Jean-Benoît Dunckel and Nicolas Godin, except where noted.

No.	Title	Length
1.	"Astronomic Club"	3:12
2.	"Seven Stars" (lyrics: Victoria Legrand; music: Legrand, Dunckel, Godin)	4:22
3.	"Retour sur terre"	0:45
4.	"Parade"	2:31
5.	"Moon Fever"	3:50
6.	"Sonic Armada"	5:06
7.	"Who Am I Now?" (lyrics: Au Revoir Simone; music: Annie Hart, Erika Forster, Heather D'Angelo, Brian Reitzell, Dunckel, Godin)	3:03
8.	"Décollage"	1:39
9.	"Cosmic Trip"	4:10
10.	"Homme lune"	0:27
11.	"Lava"	3:03

== Personnel ==
Credits adapted from the liner notes of Le voyage dans la lune.

=== Air ===
- Jean-Benoît Dunckel – Mellotron (tracks 1, 4, 6, 7, 10, 11); Wurlitzer (tracks 1, 9); piano (tracks 2, 4, 7–9, 11); synths (tracks 2, 4–6, 8–11); vocals (tracks 4, 9, 11); Solina, organ bass (track 7); vibes (tracks 7, 11); drums (track 11)
- Nicolas Godin – timpani (tracks 1, 2, 5, 7, 8); guitars (tracks 1, 2, 4, 7); synths (tracks 1–5, 9); harpsichord (track 1); bass (tracks 2, 4, 6, 9, 11); piano (tracks 3, 5); vocals (track 3); Mellotron (track 4); electric sitar (track 6); percussions (tracks 7, 8); drums (track 8); banjo, electric guitar (track 11)

=== Additional musicians ===
- Vincent Taeger – drums (tracks 1, 2, 4, 9)
- Isabelle Vuarnesson – cello (track 1)
- Victoria Legrand – vocals (track 2)
- Alex Thomas – drums (track 6)
- Au Revoir Simone – vocals (track 7)

=== Technical ===
- Air – production
- Stéphane "Alf" Briat – mixing
- Louis Arlette – sound engineering
- Chab – mastering

=== Artwork ===
- Laurent Pinon – graphic design
- Georges Méliès – artwork

== Charts ==
Chart performance for Le voyage dans la lune
Chart (2012)	Peak position
Australian Albums (ARIA)	76
Austrian Albums (Ö3 Austria)	38
Belgian Albums (Ultratop Flanders)	19
Belgian Albums (Ultratop Wallonia)	28
Canadian Albums (Nielsen SoundScan)	68
Croatian International Albums (HDU)	38
Dutch Albums (Album Top 100)	40
Finnish Albums (Suomen virallinen lista)	39
French Albums (SNEP)	17
German Albums (Offizielle Top 100)	36
Greek Albums (IFPI)	70
Irish Albums (IRMA)	21
Italian Albums (FIMI)	35
Japanese Albums (Oricon)	148
Portuguese Albums (AFP)	22
Scottish Albums (OCC)	36
Spanish Albums (Promusicae)	89
Swiss Albums (Schweizer Hitparade)	11
UK Albums (OCC)	35
US Billboard 200	57
US Top Dance Albums (Billboard)	4
