= All I Need (Air song) =

1998 single by Air

Single by Air

from the album Moon Safari
- B-side: "Kelly Watch the Stars" (Remixes)
- Released: 9 November 1998
- Recorded: April–June, 1997; "Around the Golf", Gang (Paris) and Abbey Road Studios (London)
- Genre: Dream pop; lounge; downtempo; chill-out
- Label: Virgin, Source
- Songwriters: Nicolas Godin, Jean-Benoît Dunckel, Beth Hirsch
- Producers: Nicolas Godin, Jean-Benoît Dunckel

Air singles chronology
"Kelly Watch the Stars" (1998)	"All I Need" (1998)	"Playground Love" (2000)

"All I Need" is a song by French music group Air from their debut album Moon Safari (1998). The song was written by group members Nicolas Godin and Jean-Benoît Dunckel, along with American singer Beth Hirsch, who provides vocals on the song. Production of the song was handled by the former two. The song was released as the third single from Moon Safari on 9 November 1998.

== Background ==
The song came about in a period when Beth Hirsch and Air members Nicolas Godin and Jean-Benoît Dunckel all resided in the French district of Montmartre. Hirsch had gone to record in the house of a producer who also lived in the neighborhood. In the house, Godin was sitting on a couch, waiting to meet her. Having heard a demo of Hirsch's, he invited her to record some tracks for Moon Safari. Following this invitation, Hirsch wrote the lyrics and melody of "All I Need". At the request of the band, she went on to compose another track for the album, "You Make It Easy".

Speaking about Air's decision to work with Hirsch, Jean-Benoît Dunckel told Stereogum: "[S]he had a very folk sound because she was used to playing acoustic guitar and singing. We liked that American attitude a lot, so when we met her we fused the track with her voice. That was perfect, because the song was really mellow. We wanted a conclusion at the end that was mellow and a little bit dark — melancholic. In the song, she talks about the planets and being behind the sun — the fact that you float around the planets — and we talked about that for Moon Safari a lot."

== Writing and composition ==
"All I Need" was written by Nicolas Godin, Jean-Benoît Dunckel and Beth Hirsch, and was produced by the former two. Dunckel plays multiple instruments on the track, including organ, a Korg MS-20 synthesizer, Rhodes piano and Wurlitzer electric piano. Likewise, Godin plays acoustic guitar, bass, three different synthesizers (Korg MS-20, Minimoog and Solina String Ensemble), drums and organ. Patrick Woodcock also accompanies Godin in playing acoustic guitar on the track. Audio mixing of the track was handled by Stéphane "Alf" Briat at Plus XXX Studios, a studio in Paris, with additional mixing being provided by Jérôme Blondel. The track was recorded by Godin and Dunckel at "Around the Golf" as well as in Gang, Paris. Jérôme Kerner provided additional recording of the song and Peter Cobbin recorded the song's strings at Abbey Road Studios in London. The song was mastered by Nilesh Patel. The song is based on the earlier Air track "Les professionnels", from their EP Premiers Symptômes (1997).

== Critical reception ==
"All I Need" received positive reviews from critics, who praised Hirsch's vocal performance and the track's instrumentation. Chris Jones of BBC praised Hirsch's performance on the track, writing that her vocals "could almost break your stimulant-weary heart." Mike Diver of Drowned in Sound wrote that the track "holds up well as a blissful ballad" and similarly praised Hirsch's vocal performance, as well as marking the track "still absolutely gorgeous" in his review of the 2008 re-issue of Moon Safari. Paul Schrodt of Slant Magazine wrote: "the gently plucked guitar in 'All I Need,' [...] lushly falls into place, escalates, and then dissipates into some kind of slickly produced ether." Rolling Stone described the song as "a tragic café ballad." The song was selected as one of 10,000 songs to "download and listen to before you die" in the 2010 book 1001 Songs You Must Hear Before You Die.

== Music video ==
The music video for "All I Need" was directed by Mike Mills. It features a young skateboarding couple talking about their mutual affection for each other and their relationship. The third episode of Air's web series Air Time Machine revealed that the couple featured in the video was a real couple from Ventura, California, who have since broken up. Asked about the video in an interview, Mills stated:

That video definitely was a big turning point for me as I discovered something in myself. You know when you do something and the piece is far bigger than you are. Just by luck or unconscious something pops out and you're like 'whoa, what was that?'. And with that piece it was a willingness to be totally sincere and borderline maudlin but hopefully not. Emotional without being maudlin. I had always been sort of afraid of that and hidden before behind maybe a little irony or a just little distance. But that piece kinda showed me that I can get really emotional, I can get really sincere and actually I really loved the way the audience really reacted to it. I was like I want more of that! I want more people's interior lives and how complicated that is and how sort of endless that is.

== Track listing ==
- CD maxi single (United Kingdom and Australia)
1. "All I Need" (edit) – 4:01
2. "Kelly Watch the Stars" (Moog Cookbook Remix) – 5:40
3. "Kelly Watch the Stars" (American Girls Remix) – 5:13
- 12" vinyl single (United Kingdom)

Side one

1. "All I Need" (edit) – 3:59
2. "Kelly Watch the Stars" (American Girls Remix) – 5:12

Side two

1. "Kelly Watch the Stars" (Moog Cookbook Remix) – 5:39

== Credits and personnel ==
The credits for "All I Need" are adapted from the liner notes of Moon Safari.

Mastering

- Mastered at The Exchange, London.

Mixing

- Mixed at Plus XXX Studios, Paris.

Recording

- Recorded at "Around the Golf" and at Gang, Paris.
- Strings recorded at Abbey Road Studios, London.

Personnel

- Patrick Woodcock – acoustic guitar
- Jean-Benoît Dunckel – organ, Korg MS-20 synthesizer, Rhodes piano, Wurlitzer electric piano, production, recording, songwriting
- Nicolas Godin – acoustic guitar, bass, Korg MS-20, Minimoog and Solina String Ensemble synthesizers, drums, organ, production, recording, songwriting
- Beth Hirsch – songwriting, vocals
- Stéphane "Alf" Briat – mixing, recording
- Jérôme Blondel – additional mixing
- Peter Cobbin – recording of strings
- Nilesh Patel – mastering
- Jérôme Kerner – additional recording

== Charts ==
=== Weekly charts ===
Weekly chart performance for "All I Need"
Chart (1998–1999)	Peak position
Australia (ARIA)	83
Netherlands (Dutch Top 40)	25
Netherlands (Single Top 100)	23
Scotland Singles (OCC)	28
UK Singles (OCC)	29

=== Year-end charts ===
Year-end chart performance for "All I Need"
Chart (1999)	Position
Netherlands (Dutch Top 40)	164

== Certifications ==
Certifications for "All I Need"
Region	Certification	Certified units/sales
United Kingdom (BPI)	Silver	200,000^{‡}
^{‡} Sales+streaming figures based on certification alone.
