= Pocket Symphony =

2007 studio album by Air

Studio album by Air
- Released: 5 March 2007
- Recorded: 2006
- Studios: Revolvair (Paris); Gang (Paris)
- Genres: Ambient; pop; electronic
- Length: 47:47
- Label: Virgin
- Producers: Nigel Godrich; Air

Air chronology
| Talkie Walkie (2004) | Pocket Symphony (2007) | Love 2 (2009) |

Singles from Pocket Symphony
- 1. "Once Upon a Time" Released: 29 January 2007; 2. "Mer du Japon" Released: 11 June 2007

Professional ratings
Aggregate scores
| Source | Rating |
|---|---|
| Metacritic | 63/100 |
Review scores
| Source | Rating |
| AllMusic | 4/5 stars |
| The A.V. Club | A− |
| Entertainment Weekly | C+ |
| The Guardian | 4/5 stars |
| The Irish Times | 4/5 stars |
| Mojo | 3/5 stars |
| NME | 2/10 |
| Pitchfork | 6.6/10 |
| Spin | 3/5 stars |
| Uncut | 3/5 stars |

Pocket Symphony is the fourth studio album by French electronic music duo Air, released on 5 March 2007 by Virgin Records. It features collaborations with Jarvis Cocker and Neil Hannon. Pocket Symphony incorporates some of the Japanese instruments Godin had recently learned to play from an Okinawan master musician: the koto (also referred to as a Japanese floor harp) and the three-string, banjo-like shamisen. However, a press release claims that "conventional instruments continue to play a great role" in the duo's music. The album features art by Xavier Veilhan.

Pocket Symphony debuted at number 40 on the US Billboard 200, with 17,000 copies sold in its first week. As of February 2012, it had sold 77,000 copies in the United States.

The term "pocket symphony" was popularised by English journalist Derek Taylor, who used it to describe the Beach Boys' 1966 single "Good Vibrations".

== Track listing ==
All tracks are written by JB Dunckel and Nicolas Godin, except "One Hell of a Party", lyrics by Jarvis Cocker, and "Somewhere Between Waking and Sleeping", lyrics by Neil Hannon and Cocker.

| No. | Title | Length |
|---|---|---|
| 1. | "Space Maker" | 4:01 |
| 2. | "Once Upon a Time" | 5:01 |
| 3. | "One Hell of a Party" | 4:02 |
| 4. | "Napalm Love" | 3:27 |
| 5. | "Mayfair Song" | 4:19 |
| 6. | "Left Bank" | 4:06 |
| 7. | "Photograph" | 3:51 |
| 8. | "Mer du Japon" | 3:04 |
| 9. | "Lost Message" | 3:32 |
| 10. | "Somewhere Between Waking and Sleeping" | 3:36 |
| 11. | "Redhead Girl" | 4:31 |
| 12. | "Night Sight" | 4:17 |

Opendisc bonus tracks
| No. | Title | Length |
|---|---|---|
| 13. | "Time Capsule" | 4:19 |
| 14. | "The Duelist" (featuring Jarvis Cocker and Charlotte Gainsbourg) | 4:40 |

Japanese edition bonus track
| No. | Title | Length |
|---|---|---|
| 13. | "Time Capsule" | 4:19 |

iTunes Store bonus tracks
| No. | Title | Length |
|---|---|---|
| 13. | "The Duelist" (featuring Jarvis Cocker and Charlotte Gainsbourg) | 4:40 |
| 14. | "Crickets" (originally not available in the United States) | 3:32 |

== Personnel ==
Credits adapted from the liner notes of Pocket Symphony.

=== Air ===
- Nicolas Godin – bass (tracks 1, 3, 4, 5, 7–9, 11); solina (track 1); guitars (tracks 1, 2, 4, 6–11); synth bass (track 2); drum machine (tracks 2, 4, 5, 9); shamisen (tracks 2, 3); piano (track 3); koto (tracks 3, 8–11); synthesizers (track 5); vocals (track 6); glockenspiel (tracks 7, 11); tambourine (tracks 7, 8); drums (track 8); Memorymoog (tracks 9, 11); wind chimes (track 11)
- JB Dunckel – piano (tracks 1, 2, 4, 5, 7–11); synthesizers (tracks 1–9, 11, 12); vibraphone (tracks 1, 10); vocals (tracks 2, 4, 6–8, 11); glockenspiel (track 2); samples (track 3); ARP percussions, xylophone (track 5); voice pad (tracks 5, 11); drum machine (tracks 6); Rhodes (tracks 7, 11, 12); synth bass (track 10)

=== Additional musicians ===
- Joey Waronker – drums, percussion (tracks 1, 3, 7)
- Magic Malik – flute (tracks 2, 7)
- Tony Allen – drums (track 2)
- Jarvis Cocker – vocals (track 3)
- Neil Hannon – vocals (track 10)
- Joby Talbot – string arrangements, string conducting (tracks 1, 12)
- David Richard Campbell – string arrangements (track 10)

=== Technical ===
- Nigel Godrich – production, engineering
- Air – production
- Darrell Thorp – engineering
- Florian Lagatta – engineering
- Simon Hayes – engineering assistance
- Andrew Rugg – engineering assistance
- Bob Ludwig – mastering at Gateway Mastering (Portland, Maine)

=== Artwork ===
- Xavier Veilhan – artwork
- Lili Fleury – artwork
- Laurent Pinon – artwork

== Charts ==
=== Weekly charts ===
2006 weekly chart performance for Pocket Symphony
| Chart (2007) | Peak position |
|---|---|
| Australian Albums (ARIA) | 33 |
| Austrian Albums (Ö3 Austria) | 31 |
| Belgian Albums (Ultratop Flanders) | 4 |
| Belgian Albums (Ultratop Wallonia) | 19 |
| Danish Albums (Hitlisten) | 32 |
| Dutch Albums (Album Top 100) | 30 |
| European Albums (Billboard) | 7 |
| Finnish Albums (Suomen virallinen lista) | 9 |
| French Albums (SNEP) | 8 |
| German Albums (Offizielle Top 100) | 8 |
| Irish Albums (IRMA) | 12 |
| Italian Albums (FIMI) | 13 |
| Japanese Albums (Oricon) | 156 |
| Norwegian Albums (VG-lista) | 32 |
| Portuguese Albums (AFP) | 9 |
| Spanish Albums (Promusicae) | 81 |
| Swedish Albums (Sverigetopplistan) | 30 |
| Swiss Albums (Schweizer Hitparade) | 7 |
| UK Albums (Official Charts) | 22 |
| US Billboard 200 | 40 |
| US Independent Albums (Billboard) | 3 |
| US Top Dance Albums (Billboard) | 1 |

2026 weekly chart performance for Pocket Symphony
| Chart (2026) | Peak position |
|---|---|
| Croatian International Albums (HDU) | 5 |
| Hungarian Physical Albums (MAHASZ) | 29 |

=== Year-end charts ===
Year-end chart performance for Pocket Symphony
| Chart (2007) | Position |
|---|---|
| French Albums (SNEP) | 108 |
| US Top Dance/Electronic Albums (Billboard) | 15 |
