= Music for Museum =

Soundtrack album by Air
- Released: 26 June 2014
- Length: 68:58
- Label: The Vinyl Factory
- Producer: AIR

Air chronology
| Le voyage dans la lune (2012) | Music for Museum (2014) | Twentyears (2016) |

Music for Museum is an album by French electronic music duo Air, recorded as a commission for the Palais des Beaux-Arts de Lille as part of their Open Museum project. It was released on 26 June 2014 as a limited vinyl-only release, only 1,000 copies of the album were printed. The album was printed on dual clear vinyl.

== Track listing ==
All tracks are written by Air

| No. | Title | Length |
|---|---|---|
| 1. | "Land Me" | 8:13 |
| 2. | "Reverse Bubble" | 7:21 |
| 3. | "The Dream of Yi" | 5:27 |
| 4. | "Angel Palace" | 10:42 |
| 5. | "Art Tatoo" | 15:46 |
| 6. | "Kiss Volcano" | 3:34 |
| 7. | "Integration Desintegration" | 8:42 |
| 8. | "Octogum" | 4:50 |
| 9. | "North Cloud" | 4:23 |
| Total length: | | 68:58 |
