= Air (French band) =

French music duo

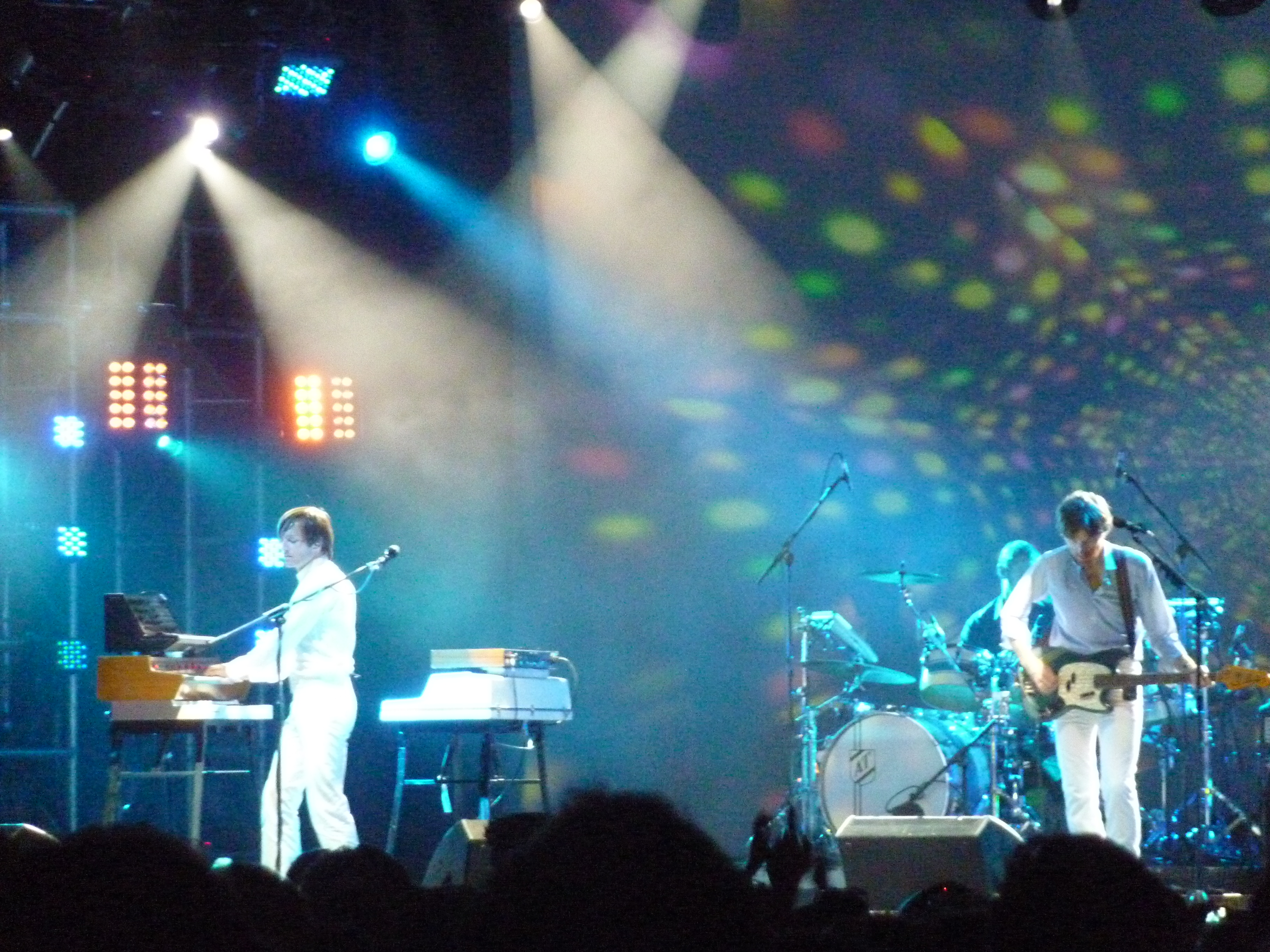
- Air performing in London in 2010

Background information
- Origin: Versailles, Île-de-France, France
- Genres: Electronic; space pop; dream pop; downtempo; progressive rock; chill-out
- Years active: 1995–present
- Labels: Source; Virgin; Astralwerks; EMI
- Members: Nicolas Godin; Jean-Benoît Dunckel
- Website: airfrenchband.com

Air is a French music duo from Versailles, consisting of Nicolas Godin and Jean-Benoît Dunckel. Their debut album, Moon Safari, including the track "Sexy Boy", was released in 1998. Its follow-up, The Virgin Suicides, was the score to Sofia Coppola's first film The Virgin Suicides. The band has since released the albums 10 000 Hz Legend, Talkie Walkie, Pocket Symphony, Love 2, Le voyage dans la lune and Music for Museum. The band is influenced by a variety of musical styles and artists.

== History ==
=== Formation ===
Nicolas Godin studied architecture at the École nationale supérieure d'architecture de Versailles, and Jean-Benoît Dunckel studied mathematics, before forming a band in 1995. Before founding Air, Dunckel and Godin played together in the band Orange with others such as Alex Gopher, Xavier Jamaux and Jean de Reydellet. The former two subsequently contributed to remixes of tracks recorded by Air.

Initially Godin worked alone, recording a demo with members of Funkadelic as his backing band before releasing his first entirely solo effort, "Modular Mix", which featured production by Étienne de Crécy.

=== First works ===
After making several remixes for other acts in the early 1990s, Air recorded their first EP, Premiers Symptômes, in 1997. The band would sign to Virgin Records and Astralwerks following the EP's success. The band's debut full-length album, Moon Safari, was released on 16 January, 1998. Air would find major international success with their song "Sexy Boy", which was released as the album's lead single. The album would produce two more chart topping singles "Kelly Watch The Stars" and "All I Need". As of February 2012, the album had sold 386,000 copies in the United States. Following the album's international success, the band would pursue a world tour, which was documented in their film Air: Eating, Sleeping, Waiting and Playing, directed by Mike Mills.

In 2000, Air composed the original score for Sofia Coppola's debut film The Virgin Suicides. Shortly after the release, the band would go on to produce their second studio album, 10 000 Hz Legend, which released on 28 May, 2001. The album features American musician Beck as well as suGar Yoshinaga of Japanese band Buffalo Daughter. Produced by Tony Hoffer, the album went on to receive polarizing reviews from both critics and fans. The album spawned four singles, of which the majority of them failed to chart internationally. According to a 2012 Soundscan, 10,000 Hz Legend sold 600,000 copies worldwide. In 2002, the duo released remixes of the album under a release titled Everybody Hertz, which featured the bonus song "The Way You Look Tonight". In 2003, the duo worked with Italian writer Alessandro Baricco, on the album City Reading (Tre Storie Western). The album started as an idea for a collaboration with Baricco, who is known for his unusual characterizations and lyrical, poetic style. Baricco contacted Air in summer 2002 with the idea to marry narration of texts from his book City with live original musical accompaniment. The performance premiered live in November 2002 at Rome's Teatro Valle and was deemed such a success that both parties resolved to make a full studio recording. In 2003, the duo worked with film director Sofia Coppola on her film Lost In Translation, where the duo provided the song "Alone In Kyoto".

=== Later years ===
On 26 January 2004, the duo released their third studio album Talkie Walkie. Produced by Nigel Godrich, the album spawned three singles: "Cherry Blossom Girl", "Surfing On a Rocket", which peaked at number 31 in the Billboard Top 40, and "Alpha Beta Gaga". Shortly after, the band went on to pursue solo projects and work with other artists. In September 2006, the duo worked with British actress Charlotte Gainsbourg on her second studio album 5:55. Dunckel released his solo album Darkel that same year. The duo was a feature on the DJ Mix series Late Night Tales, and released their set Late Night Tales: Air. The soundtrack to Coppola's October 2006 film Marie Antoinette features Air's "Il Secondo Giorno". Air would work with producer Nigel Godrich, as well as feature Jarvis Cocker and Neil Hannon on their 2007 album Pocket Symphony.

In 2009, the duo released their self-produced fifth studio album Love 2. In 2012, Air released their second film score, and sixth studio album, Le voyage dans la Lune. Air would further work on an ambient based soundtrack for the Palais des Beaux-Arts de Lille with their 2014 release Music for Museum. In 2016, the compilation album Twentyears was released, with the band pursuing a world tour which ended in 2018. Shortly after, the band went on to pursue solo projects with various releases. In 2020, Nicholas Godin released his second studio album Concrete and Glass. In 2023, the band pursued the Moon Safari tour, which was completed in 2025. In 2026 the band reissued a rare and limited clear vinyl 2LP version of Love 2, the first time in 15 years that the record will be available.

== Influences and musical style ==
Air is associated with a variety of musical styles: electronica, space pop, dream pop, progressive rock, downtempo, chillout, trip hop, ambient, electronic pop and space rock. Dunckel grew up listening to both classical and electronic music, especially Kraftwerk, as well as the 1960s and 1970s music of Serge Gainsbourg. As a fan of OMD, he regularly played the band's "Enola Gay" (1980) on a Bontempi, citing the experience as his introduction to electronic keyboards. Dunckel later took an interest in what he called the "English dark rock" of Siouxsie and the Banshees and Joy Division, while being a fan of David Bowie, Iggy Pop and Lou Reed. Brian Eno and Cluster were two of the electronic acts who inspired him the most. He cites among his favorite artists: Maurice Ravel for classical music, François de Roubaix for music soundtracks and Siouxsie and the Banshees for pop music.

Dunckel shared with Godin a special liking for the music of Michel Legrand, Philip Glass and Grace Jones. During his childhood, Godin was fascinated by the Beatles before later discovering the soul of Sly and the Family Stone, and film soundtracks like The Good, the Bad and the Ugly by Ennio Morricone. The duo were influenced by progressive rock pioneers Pink Floyd.

Air uses many of its studio instruments (including Moog synthesizers, the Korg MS-20, Wurlitzers and vocoders) on stage. The band performs tracks from their albums live as extended or altered versions. Air often collaborates (both in the studio and live) with artists like Beth Hirsch (Moon Safari), Françoise Hardy ("Jeanne"), Jean-Jacques Perrey ("Cosmic Bird"), Gordon Tracks ("Playground Love" and "Easy Going Woman" – Gordon Tracks is a pseudonym of the French singer Thomas Mars from Phoenix), Beck (10 000 Hz Legend) and Jean-Michel Jarre ("Close Your Eyes" from Jarre's Electronica 1: The Time Machine). They also invited Dave Palmer on their 2004 tour and drummer Earl Harvin, Vincent Taurelle and Steve Jones on their 2007 tour.

== AIR as an acronym ==
The band has given conflicting information about whether Air is an acronym. In a clip aired in 2022, Godin told the BBC, "AIR is an acronym. I don't know if you have the same word in English, but it's, uh, 'amour, imagination, and rêve'." Dunckel apparently said the same thing, as the interview cuts to a separately filmed portion where Dunckel says "...which means 'love, imagination, and dreaming'."

However, in a 1998 interview for Australian magazine Rave, Godin reportedly denied the claim, saying "No. Someone made that up, but it was a really nice thing to do. I wish I could have that idea."

== Equipment ==
The group has been using vintage synthesizers since their inception, and like to mention their passion for instruments in interviews, defining themselves as musicians first and foremost and combining acoustic and synthetic sounds as well as analog and digital. Air's sound identity is based on a core set of instruments that never change, such as bass, the Solina String Ensemble, the Rhodes electric piano, and the Korg MS-20.

Here is the list of stage equipment for each album tour.

- Moon Safari (JB Dunckel, Nicolas Godin, Brian Reitzell, Roger Manning Jr., Brian Kehew, Justin Meldal-Johnsen)
  - Moog Source, Roland JX-3P, Minimoog, Wurlitzer 200A
  - Solina String Ensemble, Yamaha CS1x
  - Hammond XB-2, Roland PC-180, Fender Jaguar guitar, E-mu SP-1200
  - Fender Rhodes Suitcase Mk I, Roland VP-330 Vocoder Plus, Korg MS-20
  - Moog Theremin
- 10 000 Hz Legend (JB Dunckel, Nicolas Godin, Brian Reitzell, Jason Falkner, James Rotondi)
  - Roland VP 330, Roland PC-200, Fender Rhodes Mk II, Moogerfooger MF-103, Solina String Ensemble, Korg MS-20, Akai MPC 2000 XL
  - Alesis A6 Andromeda, Kurzweil keyboard
  - Korg CX-3 (with EHX Memory Man), Roland PC-200, harmonica
  - Boss Dr Sample SP-202, Boss VT-1 Voice Transformer, EHX Delay, Moogerfooger MF-104
  - Gibson SG, 70's Guild D35 acoustic guitar
  - 70's Fender Mustang Bass, Ashdown amplifier
- Talkie Walkie (JB Dunckel, Nicolas Godin, Dave Palmer, Earl Harvin)
  - Yamaha CP-80, Nord Lead 2, Korg MS-20, Solina String Ensemble, Fender Rhodes Mk I, Roland AX-7 keytar
  - Sequential Circuits Six-Trak, Hammond XB-2, Roland SH-101 (blue version), microKORG, Minimoog Voyager
- Pocket Symphony (JB Dunckel, Nicolas Godin, Steve Jones, Vincent Taurelle, Earl Harvin)
  - Yamaha CP-80, Korg MS-20, Solina String Ensemble, Fender Rhodes Mk I
  - Roland VP-550, Fender Mustang Competition Red bass, Höfner Club Bass 500/2, Guild acoustic guitar
- Love 2 (JB Dunckel, Nicolas Godin, Alex Thomas)
  - Korg MS-20, Solina String Ensemble, Manikin Memotron, Wurlitzer, Moog Source
  - Roland VP-550, Fender Mustang Blue Competition bass, Guild D35

The group uses samples in their tracks:

- Remember: The Beach Boys - Do It Again
- La Femme d'argent: Can - Future Days, Edwin Starr - Runnin'
- Modular Mix: James Brown - I Got Ants In My Pants, Gil Scott-Heron - We Almost Lost Detroit, Miles Davis - So What
- Brakes On: Odetta - Hit or Miss
- Dirty Trip: Brian Auger's Oblivion Express - Dawn of Another Day
- Don't Be Light: Jean-Pierre Decerf - Arabian Era

== Discography ==
- Moon Safari (1998)
- 10 000 Hz Legend (2001)
- Talkie Walkie (2004)
- Pocket Symphony (2007)
- Love 2 (2009)
- Le voyage dans la lune (2012)

== Awards ==
Air won the award for Best Music Video at the 2011 Byron Bay International Film Festival for their video to "So Light Is Her Footfall".

== Documentaries ==
=== Air: Eating, Sleeping, Waiting and Playing (1999) ===
In 1999, American film and music video director, writer, and graphic designer Mike Mills released a 75-minute black-and-white documentary titled Air: Eating, Sleeping, Waiting and Playing. The film, shot during Air's 1998 tour, captures band members Nicolas Godin and Jean-Benoît Dunckel during stops in New York, London, and Paris. As suggested by the title, the documentary's tone and form focus on the drudgery and banality of real-life touring for music artists.

Mills had previously collaborated with Air on their music videos.

The documentary was distributed by Source - une division de Virgin disques as a Stereo DVD. The documentary is also included in Criterion's Blu-Ray and 4K release I’ll Remind You of Everything: The Films of Mike Mills.

== See also ==
- List of ambient music artists
