= 10 000 Hz Legend =

2001 studio album by Air

Studio album by Air
- Released: 28 May 2001
- Recorded: 2000–2001
- Studio: Appolo (Paris); Bomb Factory (Los Angeles); Hollywood Sound (Hollywood); Capitol (Hollywood)
- Genre: Space rock; electronic; progressive rock; new prog
- Length: 60:44
- Label: Source; Virgin
- Producer: Air; Tony Hoffer

Air chronology
The Virgin Suicides (2000)	10 000 Hz Legend (2001)	Talkie Walkie (2004)

Singles from 10 000 Hz Legend
- 1. "Radio #1" Released: 14 May 2001; 2. "Don't Be Light" Released: 18 February 2002; 3. "How Does It Make You Feel?" Released: 18 February 2002; 4. "People in the City" Released: 18 February 2002

10 000 Hz Legend is the second studio album by French electronic music duo Air, released in France on 28 May 2001 by Virgin Records and in the United States on 29 May 2001 by Astralwerks. On this album, tracks are longer and more electronic-oriented than on their previous records. These experimentations find the duo expanding their capacities and working with other artists including Beck and suGar Yoshinaga of Buffalo Daughter.

The album artwork was produced by Ito Morabito. It features Monument Valley, located on the Arizona–Utah border.

== Critical reception ==
Professional ratings
Aggregate scores
Source	Rating
Metacritic	68/100
Review scores
Source	Rating
AllMusic	3/5 stars
Alternative Press	8/10
Entertainment Weekly	C
The Guardian	2/5 stars
Muzik	5/5
NME	9/10
Pitchfork	7.6/10
Q	3/5 stars
Rolling Stone	2.5/5 stars
Spin	7/10

10 000 Hz Legend received generally less favourable reviews from critics than had their previous albums; however, Q listed 10 000 Hz Legend as one of the 50 best albums of 2001. Most reviewers were dissatisfied on the group's departure from the sound of 1998's Moon Safari, although the soundtrack album The Virgin Suicides (2000) had a similar mood and sound.

The American music website Stereogum takes its name from the lyrics of the song "Radio #1".

== Track listing ==
All tracks are written by Jean-Benoît Dunckel and Nicolas Godin, except where noted.

No.	Title	Length
1.	"Electronic Performers"	5:36
2.	"How Does It Make You Feel?"	4:37
3.	"Radio #1"	4:22
4.	"The Vagabond" (lyrics by Dunckel, Godin and Beck Hansen)	5:37
5.	"Radian"	7:37
6.	"Lucky and Unhappy"	4:31
7.	"Sex Born Poison" (lyrics by Dunckel, Godin and suGar Yoshinaga)	6:18
8.	"People in the City"	4:57
9.	"Wonder Milky Bitch"	5:50
10.	"Don't Be Light"	6:18
11.	"Caramel Prisoner"	4:58

Japanese edition bonus track
No.	Title	Length
12.	"The Way You Look Tonight"	3:46

== Personnel ==
Credits adapted from the liner notes of 10 000 Hz Legend.

=== Musicians ===
- Air – arrangements
- Brian Reitzell – drums (tracks 2–5, 8–10); drum sounds (tracks 3, 10)
- Justin Meldal-Johnsen – bass (tracks 2, 3, 5, 10); solo vocals (track 3); drum sound (tracks 3, 10)
- Roger Joseph Manning Jr – keyboards (tracks 3, 5, 10); vocals (tracks 2, 3)
- Beck Hansen – vocals (tracks 4, 10); harmonica (track 4)
- Jason Falkner – vocals (tracks 3, 6, 8)
- Ken Andrews – vocals (tracks 3, 6, 8)
- Buffalo Daughter – vocals (track 7)
- Lisa Papineau – vocals (track 6)
- Jean Croc – whistle (track 10)
- Elin Carlson – solo soprano (track 10)
- Barbara Cohen – voice (track 5)
- Corky Hale – harp (track 5)
- Julia Sarr – background vocals (track 8)
- Olyza – background vocals (track 8)
- Thomas – hand claps (track 4)
- Annabel – hand claps (track 4)
- Jean-Benoît Dunckel – hand claps (track 4)
- Roger Neill – string, choir and flute conducting, arrangements

=== Technical ===
- Air – recording, production
- Julien Marty – sound engineering
- Julien Doubey – sound engineering
- Pascal Garnon – drum recording
- Brian Kehew – sound engineering
- Bruce Keen – sound engineering, editing
- Tony Hoffer – additional production, editing, mixing
- Julien Delfaud – mixing assistance
- Nilesh Patel – mastering
- Stéphane Elfassi – executive production
- Marc Teissier du Cros – executive production

=== Artwork ===
- Abake – Air logo, layout
- Ora-Ïto – concept, design
- Arno Bani – photography

== Charts ==
=== Weekly charts ===
Weekly chart performance for 10 000 Hz Legend
Chart (2001)	Peak position
Australian Albums (ARIA)	13
Austrian Albums (Ö3 Austria)	7
Belgian Albums (Ultratop Flanders)	20
Belgian Albums (Ultratop Wallonia)	8
Danish Albums (Hitlisten)	39
Dutch Albums (Album Top 100)	54
European Albums (Music & Media)	8
Finnish Albums (Suomen virallinen lista)	13
French Albums (SNEP)	7
German Albums (Offizielle Top 100)	7
Irish Albums (IRMA)	14
Italian Albums (FIMI)	18
Japanese Albums (Oricon)	86
New Zealand Albums (RMNZ)	35
Norwegian Albums (VG-lista)	3
Polish Albums (ZPAV)	30
Scottish Albums (OCC)	11
Swedish Albums (Sverigetopplistan)	39
Swiss Albums (Schweizer Hitparade)	11
UK Albums (OCC)	7
US Billboard 200	88
US Independent Albums (Billboard)	2
US Top Dance Albums (Billboard)	3

=== Year-end charts ===
Year-end chart performance for 10 000 Hz Legend
Chart (2001)	Position
UK Albums (OCC)	195

== Certifications and sales ==
Certifications and sales for 10 000 Hz Legend
Region	Certification	Certified units/sales
United Kingdom (BPI)	Gold	100,000^{^}
United States	—	80,000
Summaries
Worldwide	—	600,000
^{^} Shipments figures based on certification alone.
