= The Virgin Suicides (score) =

2000 film score by Air

Film score by Air
- Released: 23 February 2000
- Recorded: 1999
- Genre: Ambient; chill-out; progressive rock; electronica; electropop
- Length: 40:27
- Label: Record Makers; Source; Virgin
- Producer: Air

Air chronology
Moon Safari (1998)	The Virgin Suicides (2000)	10 000 Hz Legend (2001)

Singles from The Virgin Suicides
- 1. "Playground Love" Released: 17 January 2000

The Virgin Suicides is a score composed by French electronic music duo Air for the 1999 film of the same name by Sofia Coppola. It was released on 23 February 2000 by Virgin Records. The album was nominated for Best Soundtrack at the 2001 Brit Awards. The French edition of Rolling Stone magazine placed The Virgin Suicides at number 49 on their list of the 100 essential French rock albums. In 2014, NME placed the album at number 11 on their "61 of the Greatest Film Soundtracks Ever" list. In 2019, Pitchfork placed the album at number four on their "Top 50 Best Movie Scores of All Time" list.

On 3 June 2010, Air performed the full score with the band Hot Rats (with members of Supergrass) at the Cité de la Musique in Paris.

To celebrate the 15th anniversary of the film The Virgin Suicides, a deluxe edition of the album was released in June 2015 as a two-disc set and a super deluxe box set. The former contains two studio outtakes on disc one and a bonus disc of previously unreleased live recordings, while the latter includes the album on 180-gram red vinyl, an exclusive picture disc featuring previously unreleased live recordings, the "Playground Love" EP on 180-gram red vinyl, the two-disc deluxe edition of The Virgin Suicides on CD, a 16-page booklet featuring an unpublished Air interview, a film poster, a replica VIP laminate pass and a download card.

== Background ==
According to Jean-Benoît Dunckel, the album was recorded quickly. At first the music was inspired by the film and an attempt was made to synchronise the music with scenes from the film; towards the end of the process, the intention was to craft songs which could be listened to on their own.

== Critical reception ==
Professional ratings
Aggregate scores
Source	Rating
Metacritic	77/100
Review scores
Source	Rating
AllMusic	3.5/5 stars
Alternative Press	4/5
Entertainment Weekly	B+
Melody Maker	4/5 stars
Muzik	4/5 stars
NME	8/10
Pitchfork	7.2/10
Q	3/5 stars
Rolling Stone	3/5 stars
The Rolling Stone Album Guide	3.5/5 stars

The Virgin Suicides received generally positive reviews from music critics. At Metacritic, which assigns a normalised rating out of 100 to reviews from mainstream publications, the album received an average score of 77, based on 16 reviews. In a 2020 review of the score, NPR's Paula Mejía praised the music for capturing the spirit of being a teenager, concluding, "Listening to the Virgin Suicides score on loop hasn't been so much an exercise in nostalgia, or even a means of escape. Reliving it is more of a prescient reminder—one I needed to hear as a teenager, and that I could use again today—that now is not forever."

== Track listing ==
All tracks are written by Nicolas Godin and Jean-Benoît Dunckel, except "Playground Love", written by Gordon Tracks, Godin and Dunckel.

No.	Title	Length
1.	"Playground Love"	3:32
2.	"Clouds Up"	1:30
3.	"Bathroom Girl"	2:25
4.	"Cemetary Party"	2:36
5.	"Dark Messages"	2:28
6.	"The Word 'Hurricane'"	2:33
7.	"Dirty Trip"	6:12
8.	"Highschool Lover" (theme from The Virgin Suicides)	2:42
9.	"Afternoon Sister"	2:24
10.	"Ghost Song"	2:16
11.	"Empty House"	2:58
12.	"Dead Bodies"	2:59
13.	"Suicide Underground"	5:52

Alternate tracks
No.	Title	Length
14.	"Bathroom Girl" (demo version)	4:14
15.	"Playground Love" (vibraphone version)	3:50
16.	"Highschool Lover" (redux version)	2:40
17.	"Highschool Prom Playground Love" (Rob remix)	2:26

== Personnel ==
Credits adapted from the liner notes of The Virgin Suicides.

- Air – production, recording
- Gordon Tracks (Note: Gordon Tracks is a pseudonym of Phoenix lead singer Thomas Mars.) – vocals, drums (track 1)
- Hugo Ferran – saxophone (track 1)
- Brian Reitzell – drums (tracks 3, 6, 7, 12, 13)
- Pascal Garnon – drum recording
- Stéphane "Alf" Briat – mixing
- Mike Mills – drawing

== Charts ==
Weekly chart performance for The Virgin Suicides
Chart (2000–2001)	Peak position
Australian Albums (ARIA)	92
Belgian Albums (Ultratop Flanders)	37
Dutch Albums (Album Top 100)	89
European Albums (Music & Media)	31
French Albums (SNEP)	34
German Albums (Offizielle Top 100)	26
Irish Albums (IRMA)	27
Scottish Albums (OCC)	23
Swiss Albums (Schweizer Hitparade)	51
UK Albums (OCC)	14
US Billboard 200	161

Weekly chart performance for the 15th anniversary deluxe edition
Chart (2015)	Peak position
Hungarian Albums (MAHASZ)	27

2025 weekly chart performance for The Virgin Suicides
Chart (2025)	Peak position
Belgian Albums (Ultratop Wallonia)	87
Croatia International Albums (HDU)	6

== Certifications and sales ==
Certifications and sales for The Virgin Suicides
Region	Certification	Certified units/sales
France (SNEP)	Gold	100,000^{*}
United Kingdom (BPI)	Gold	100,000^{‡}
United States	—	159,000
^{*} Sales figures based on certification alone.^{‡} Sales+streaming figures based on certification alone.

== Release history ==
Release history for The Virgin Suicides
Region	Date	Label	Ref.
Japan	23 February 2000	Toshiba-EMI	
Germany	25 February 2000	Record Makers; Source; Virgin	
France	28 February 2000	Record Makers; Source; Virgin	
United Kingdom	28 February 2000	Record Makers; Source; Virgin	
United States	29 February 2000	Astralwerks	

Release history for The Virgin Suicides (15th anniversary deluxe edition)
Region	Date	Format	Label	Ref(s)
France	15 June 2015	2-CD; box set; digital download	Aircheology; Parlophone	
United Kingdom	15 June 2015	2-CD; box set; digital download	Aircheology; Parlophone	
Germany	15 June 2015	Digital download	Parlophone	
United States	16 June 2015	Digital download	Parlophone	
Japan	16 June 2015	Digital download	Parlophone	
Japan	17 June 2015	2-CD	Warner	
Australia	19 June 2015	2-CD; box set; digital download	Warner	
Germany	19 June 2015	2-CD; box set	Warner	
United States	23 June 2015	2-CD	Rhino; Parlophone	
