= Early Days (Beth Hirsch album) =

Studio album by Beth Hirsch
- Released: June 2000
- Label: Studio !K7

Beth Hirsch chronology
Early Days (2000)	Titles & Idols (2001)

Early Days is the first album by Beth Hirsch, released in 2000.

== Critical reception ==
Professional ratings
Review scores
Source	Rating
AllMusic	3/5 stars
Robert Christgau	(dud)
The Encyclopedia of Popular Music	3/5 stars
The Evening Post	3/5 stars

AllMusic wrote that Hirsch "bridges powdery lyrics and floating acoustics throughout the nine-track album, singing from an inner spirituality." The Evening Post wrote that "it's possibly a little too narrowly focused and while the self-penned arrangements are beguiling, the disc hardly progresses beyond delicate and pretty." Newsday deemed the album "standard acoustic singer-songwriter fare, a throwback to the days when Joni Mitchell sounded fresh."

== Track listing ==
All tracks written by Beth Hirsch.

1. "Come a Day" – 3:35
2. "Gabrielle" – 3:58
3. "Mary the Angel" – 3:58
4. "Life Is Mine" – 3:06
5. "Somebody Dandy" – 3:45
6. "The More We Live" – 4:03
7. "No Refrain" – 3:17
8. "Dream On" – 2:29
9. "Silent Song" – 4:07

== Personnel ==
- Beth Hirsch – vocals
- Paul Simm – piano
- Phil Hudson – guitar
- Danny Cummings – percussion
- Nana Tsiboe – percussion
- Laura Fairhurst – cello
- Arnie Somogyl – double bass
