= Concrete and Glass =

Studio album by Nicolas Godin
- Released: 24 January 2020
- Label: NCLS; Because
- Producer: Pierre Rousseau

Nicolas Godin chronology
| Contrepoint (2015) | Concrete and Glass (2020) |

Professional ratings
Aggregate scores
| Source | Rating |
|---|---|
| Metacritic | 71/100 |
Review scores
| Source | Rating |
| AllMusic | 3.5/5 stars |
| The Guardian | 3/5 stars |
| MusicOMH | 3.5/5 stars |
| Pitchfork | 6.7/10 |

Concrete and Glass is the second studio album by French musician Nicolas Godin. It was released on 24 January 2020 through Because Music.

The first single from the album, "The Border" was released on October 12, 2019. The second single "The Foundation" was released on 28 November 2019. The third single "Catch Yourself Falling" was released on March 11, 2020.

This song is one of the songs used in SBS's WeatherWatch program.

== Critical reception ==
Concrete and Glass was met with generally favorable reviews from critics. At Metacritic, which assigns a weighted average rating out of 100 to reviews from mainstream publications, this release received an average score of 71, based on 7 reviews.

== Track listing ==
Concrete and Glass track listing
| No. | Title | Writer(s) | Composer(s) | Length |
|---|---|---|---|---|
| 1. | "Concrete and Glass" | Nicolas Godin | Nicolas Godin | 4:13 |
| 2. | "Back to Your Heart" (featuring Kate NV) | David Numwami | Godin; Yekaterina Shilonosova | 4:46 |
| 3. | "We Forgot Love" (featuring Kadhja Bonet) | Kadhja Bonet | Godin | 5:06 |
| 4. | "What Makes Me Think About You" | Godin | Godin; Pierre Rousseau | 4:11 |
| 5. | "Time on My Hands" (featuring Kirin J Callinan) | Kirin J Callinan | Godin | 4:28 |
| 6. | "The Foundation" (featuring Cola Boyy) | Matthew Urango | Godin; Rousseau | 5:29 |
| 7. | "Catch Yourself Falling" (featuring Alexis Taylor) | Alexis Taylor | Godin; Rousseau | 4:10 |
| 8. | "The Border" | Godin | Godin | 4:49 |
| 9. | "Turn Right, Turn Left" | Godin | Godin; Rousseau | 3:54 |
| 10. | "Cité radieuse" | | Godin | 4:09 |

== Charts ==
Chart performance for Concrete and Glass
| Chart | Peak position |
|---|---|
| French Albums (SNEP) | 149 |
| UK Independent Albums (OCC) | 28 |

== See also ==
- List of 2020 albums
