= Premiers Symptômes =

EP by Air
- Released: 29 July 1997
- Recorded: 1995–1997
- Genre: Electronica; space pop
- Length: 27:00
- Label: Source; Virgin
- Producer: Air; Étienne de Crécy

Air chronology
Premiers Symptômes (1997)	Moon Safari (1998)

Singles from Premiers Symptômes
- 1. "Modular Mix" Released: 1995; 2. "Casanova 70" Released: 1996; 3. "Le soleil est près de moi" Released: 1997

Professional ratings
Review scores
Source	Rating
AllMusic	4.5/5 stars
The Austin Chronicle	4/5 stars
Entertainment Weekly	B+
Muzik	5/5 stars
NME	7/10
Pitchfork	7.8/10
Q	4/5 stars
Rolling Stone	3.5/5 stars
The Rolling Stone Album Guide	3.5/5 stars

Premiers Symptômes (English: First Symptoms) is the debut extended play (EP) by French electronic music duo Air. It consists of singles issued between 1995 and 1997.

== History ==
"Les professionnels" later served as the basis for Air's 1998 single "All I Need" on their debut album Moon Safari.

Of 'Le soleil est près de moi', Nicolas Godin said: "It's the best song we ever did. It proves the best that you do isn't always the most successful. It came very naturally. The hard thing was finding a sentence to express the feeling we had. It was winter, so we wanted to have the sun near us. We did it in my living room before we were official artists, and we had so many problems with neighbours complaining about the noise of the Fender Rhodes. It was horrible."

The EP was re-released in 1999 and included two bonus tracks.

As of 2001, it has sold 77,000 copies in the United States according to Nielsen SoundScan.

== Track listing ==
No.	Title	Length
1.	"Modulor Mix"	5:59
2.	"Casanova 70"	5:53
3.	"Les professionnels"	4:32
4.	"J'ai dormi sous l'eau"	5:42
5.	"Le soleil est près de moi"	4:52

1999 re-release bonus tracks
No.	Title	Length
6.	"Californie"	2:27
7.	"Brakes On"	4:22

Japanese bonus tracks
No.	Title	Length
8.	"Le soleil est près de moi" (Buffalo Daughter remix)	4:48
9.	"Le soleil est près de moi" (Money Mark remix)	2:37

== Personnel ==
- Air – production
- Jean-Benoît Dunckel - Fender Rhodes piano, organ, Solina Strings Ensemble, Korg MS20 and Mini Moog synthesizers, clavinet, choir, and vocoder effects
- Nicolas Godin - bass, Solina Strings Ensemble, Mini Moog synthesizer, drums, percussion, samples, Sitar, reverse piano, talk box, vocoder effects, Fender Rhodes piano, guitars, voice
- Alex Gopher – reverse Rhodes (track 1)
- Xavier Jamaux – sampler (track 1)
- Eric Regert – organ (track 2)
- Etienne Wersinger – tambura (track 4)
- Patrick Woodcock – euphonium (tracks 2–5); acoustic guitar (track 3)
- Stéphane Briat – mixing (tracks 2, 4, 5)
- Étienne de Crécy – production, mixing (tracks 1, 3)
- Alexandre Courtès – artwork
- Fabrice Lepicier – photography
- Sabotage! – design
- Guy Davie – mastering

== Charts ==
=== Weekly charts ===
Chart (1999)	Peak position
Australian Albums Chart	63
UK Albums Chart	12
US Top Heatseekers	18

=== Certifications ===
Country	Certification
United Kingdom	Gold
