= Moon Safari =

1998 studio album by Air

Studio album by Air
- Released: 16 January 1998
- Recorded: April–June 1997
- Studios: Around the Golf (Paris); Gang (Paris); Abbey Road (London) (Note: Strings)
- Genres: Downtempo; electronica; lounge; chill-out; space pop; dream pop; psychedelia
- Length: 43:35
- Labels: Source; Virgin
- Producers: Jean-Benoît Dunckel; Nicolas Godin

Air chronology
Premiers Symptômes (1997)	Moon Safari (1998)	The Virgin Suicides (2000)

Singles from Moon Safari
- 1. "Sexy Boy" Released: 9 February 1998; 2. "Kelly Watch the Stars" Released: 4 May 1998; 3. "All I Need" Released: 9 November 1998

Moon Safari is the debut studio album by French electronic music duo Air, released on 16 January 1998 by Source and Virgin Records. Moon Safari was re-released on 14 April 2008 to mark the album's 10th anniversary, including a bound book, a DVD documentary about the duo, and a bonus CD with live performances and remixes, and on 15 March 2024, to mark the album's 25th anniversary.

Moon Safari was acclaimed by critics. It is credited with setting the stage for the budding downtempo music style. By February 2012, it had sold 386,000 copies in the United States.

== Critical reception ==
Professional ratings
Review scores
Source	Rating
AllMusic	5/5 stars
Entertainment Weekly	A−
The Guardian	4/5 stars
Mixmag	5/5 stars
NME	8/10
Pitchfork	7.9/10
Rolling Stone	3.5/5 stars
The Rolling Stone Album Guide	4.5/5 stars
Spin	7/10
The Village Voice	A−

Moon Safari was met with general acclaim upon its release. Writing in Mixmag, Alexis Petridis called it a "superbly inventive" album that "creates a soundworld in your living room, a world where everything's more shiny, chic and sophisticated than reality". John Mulvey of NME praised Air's "sensitive but tenacious grasp of melody, a laid-back disposition and a reckless way with a Vocoder that makes them unafraid of sounding like a digital ELO", also noting similarities to Garbage on "Sexy Boy". Entertainment Weekly's Ethan Smith felt that though the album occasionally bears excessive resemblance to Everything but the Girl, "Air leaven it all with a welcome dash of Gallic irony." Pitchfork writer Brent DiCrescenzo remarked that the music would befit "minimalist architecture design, shagging up against a tree in a field of sunflowers, waiting in line for 'Space Mountain,' drinking gin upstairs in a 747 (circa 1974), and '60s Swedish industrial documentaries", adding that though the album is "too cheeky" for everyday listening, it is nonetheless romantic.

Rolling Stone's Rob Sheffield was more reserved in his praise, praising the album's stylistic range and the instrumental songs but calling the group "obsessive". (Retrospectively in its album guide, Rolling Stone awarded the album four-and-a-half stars.) Likewise, Spin's Jeff Salamon felt that though the album's pathos is "heartening", the music lacks irony.

=== Accolades ===
Moon Safari was voted as the best album of the year in The Face and in Select. It featured in top 10 lists for magazines such as Melody Maker, NME and Mojo. Spin selected Moon Safari as one of its Top 20 Albums of the Year.

Rolling Stone ranked the album at number 93 on its list of the best albums of the 1990s, while the magazine's French edition ranked it at number 65 on its "100 Essential French Rock Albums" list. In a retrospective review, John Bush of AllMusic commented that Moon Safari "delivered the emotional power of great dance music even while pushing the barriers of what 'electronica' could or should sound like", and that the album "proved they could also write accessible pop songs like 'Sexy Boy' and 'Kelly Watch the Stars'" while also containing successful experiments with less pop-oriented material. The album was also included in the book 1001 Albums You Must Hear Before You Die. In 2000 it was voted number 68 in Colin Larkin's All Time Top 1000 Albums.

== Legacy ==
Dave Depper of American alternative rock band Death Cab for Cutie recreated the entire Moon Safari for his cover album, released in November 2021. As part of the album's 25th anniversary, Air approached British producer Vegyn to re-imagine the album. Described by Nicolas Godin as a "reinvention", the album was released by Parlophone in April 2025.

== Track listing ==
All music is composed by Jean-Benoît Dunckel and Nicolas Godin, except where noted.

No.	Title	English translation	Length
1.	"La Femme d'argent"	"The Silver Woman"/"The Money Girl"	7:08
2.	"Sexy Boy"		4:57
3.	"All I Need" (lyrics: Beth Hirsch)		4:28
4.	"Kelly Watch the Stars"		3:44
5.	"Talisman"		4:16
6.	"Remember" (music: Jean-Jacques Perrey, Dunckel, Godin)		2:34
7.	"You Make It Easy" (lyrics: Hirsch)		4:00
8.	"Ce matin là" (music: Dunckel, Godin, Patrick Woodcock)	"That Morning"	3:38
9.	"New Star in the Sky (Chanson pour Solal)"	"Song for Solal"	5:38
10.	"Le Voyage de Pénélope"	"Penelope's Voyage"	3:10

10th anniversary special edition (2008)

Bonus disc
No.	Title	English translation	Length
1.	"Remember" (D. Whitaker version)		2:25
2.	"Kelly Watch the Stars" (live on the BBC, 1998)		2:44
3.	"J'ai dormi sous l'eau" (live on the BBC, 1998)	"I Slept Under Water"	4:10
4.	"Sexy Boy" (live on the BBC, 1998)		3:10
5.	"Kelly Watch the Stars" (Moog Cookbook remix)		5:40
6.	"Trente millions d'amis" (music: Jack Arel, TV series theme song, live on KCRW radio, 1998)	"Thirty Million Friends"	4:34
7.	"You Make It Easy" (live on KCRW, 1998)		4:45
8.	"Bossa 96" (demo)		4:44
9.	"Kelly Watch the Stars" (demo)		3:46
10.	"Sexy Boy" (Sex Kino mix)		6:36

DVD

- "Eating Sleeping Waiting & Playing" by Mike Mills.
- Music videos for "Sexy Boy", "Kelly Watch the Stars", "All I Need", and "Le soleil est près de moi" (from the Premiers Symptômes EP).
- Graphics and storyboards.

25th anniversary special edition (2024)

No.	Title	Length
1.	"Dirty Hiroshima"	4:23
2.	"New Star in the Sky" (demo 1)	5:35
3.	"Ce matin-là" (demo 2)	3:15
4.	"Maggot Brain" (live at Paradiso, Amsterdam 31/10/1998)	7:23
5.	"J'ai dormi sous l'eau" (live BBC 1998)	4:09
6.	"Sexy Boy" (live BBC 1998)	3:38
7.	"Kelly Watch the Stars" (live BBC 1998)	3:05
8.	"Kelly Watch the Stars" (extended version)	7:27
9.	"Remember" (David Whitaker version)	2:21

== Personnel ==
Credits adapted from the liner notes of Moon Safari.

Air

- Nicolas Godin – bass (tracks 1–3, 5–10); tambourine (tracks 1, 2, 6); Minimoog (tracks 1, 3, 6, 9, 10); backing vocals (tracks 1, 8); hand claps (tracks 1, 4, 10); vocals, syrinx, Moog solo (track 2); Korg MS-20 (tracks 2, 10); electric guitar (tracks 2, 6, 8); talk box (tracks 2, 6, 9); acoustic guitar (tracks 3, 7–9); organ, drums, Solina String Ensemble (track 3); vocoder (tracks 4, 6, 9); Moog bass, Casiotone (track 4); glockenspiel (tracks 4, 7); Wurlitzer (track 5); drum machine (tracks 5, 7, 10); Roland String Ensemble (track 6); percussions, Moog Wave, hand rubbing (track 7); harmonica, reverse ride (tracks 7, 8); Rhodes chorus, shaker (track 8); piano (track 10)
- Jean-Benoît Dunckel – Rhodes (tracks 1–7, 9, 10); Solina String Ensemble (all tracks); organ (tracks 1–3, 6, 7, 10); syrinx, Moog solo (tracks 1, 2, 4, 8); backing vocals (tracks 1, 6, 8); Korg MS-20 (tracks 1, 4–6, 9); hand claps (tracks 1, 4, 10); piano (tracks 1, 4, 7, 9); vocals (track 2); Wurlitzer (tracks 3, 6); Korg MS-20 intro (track 3); vocoder (tracks 4, 6, 9); glockenspiel (track 4); clavinet (tracks 4, 8, 10); Minimoog (tracks 4, 5); Casiotone, hand rubbing (track 7); Rhodes verses (track 8); Mellotron (track 9)

Additional musicians

- Eric Regert – organ solo (track 1)
- Alf – hand claps (track 1)
- Caroline L. – hand claps (track 1)
- Marlon – drums (tracks 2, 4, 5)
- Beth Hirsch – vocals (tracks 3, 7); backing vocals (track 7)
- P. Woodcock – acoustic guitar (track 3); trombone (track 8)
- David Whitaker – string arrangement, conducting (tracks 5, 7, 8)
- Enfants Square Burq – laughs (track 9)

Technical

- Jean-Benoît Dunckel – production, recording
- Nicolas Godin – production, recording
- Stéphane "Alf" Briat – recording, mixing
- Jérôme Kerner – recording assistance
- Peter Cobbin – string recording (tracks 5, 7, 8)
- Jérôme Blondel – mixing assistance
- Nilesh Patel – mastering

Artwork

- Mike Mills – design
- The Directors Bureau – art production

== Charts ==
=== Weekly charts ===
Weekly chart performance for Moon Safari
Chart (1998–2001)	Peak position
Australian Albums (ARIA)	24
Austrian Albums (Ö3 Austria)	20
Belgian Albums (Ultratop Flanders)	48
Dutch Albums (Album Top 100)	27
European Albums (Music & Media)	19
French Albums (SNEP)	21
German Albums (Offizielle Top 100)	56
Irish Albums (IRMA)	7
New Zealand Albums (RMNZ)	34
Norwegian Albums (VG-lista)	13
Scottish Albums (Official Charts)	7
Swedish Albums (Sverigetopplistan)	52
Swiss Albums (Schweizer Hitparade)	46
UK Albums (Official Charts)	6
US Heatseekers Albums (Billboard)	41

Weekly chart performance for Moon Safari
Chart (2024–2026)	Peak position
Croatian International Albums (HDU)	21
Croatian International Albums (HDU) Live & Demos	22
Greek Albums (IFPI)	25
Hungarian Physical Albums (MAHASZ)	9

=== Year-end charts ===
1998 year-end chart performance for Moon Safari
Chart (1998)	Position
UK Albums (OCC)	80

1999 year-end chart performance for Moon Safari
Chart (1999)	Position
Dutch Albums (Album Top 100)	93
UK Albums (OCC)	94

2001 year-end chart performance for Moon Safari
Chart (2001)	Position
UK Albums (OCC)	197

2002 year-end chart performance for Moon Safari
Chart (2002)	Position
UK Albums (OCC)	174

== Certifications and sales ==
Certifications and sales for Moon Safari
Region	Certification	Certified units/sales
Australia (ARIA)	Gold	35,000^{^}
Belgium (BRMA)	Platinum	50,000^{*}
Denmark (IFPI Danmark)	2× Platinum	40,000^{‡}
France (SNEP)	Gold	100,000^{*}
Germany (BVMI)	Gold	250,000^{^}
Netherlands (NVPI)	Platinum	100,000^{^}
Switzerland (IFPI Switzerland)	Gold	25,000^{^}
United Kingdom (BPI)	2× Platinum	600,000^{^}
United States	—	386,000
Summaries
Worldwide	—	2,000,000
^{*} Sales figures based on certification alone.^{^} Shipments figures based on certification alone.^{‡} Sales+streaming figures based on certification alone.
