= Mike Mills (director) =

American film director

- Born: Michael Chadbourne Mills; March 20, 1966 (age 60); Berkeley, California, U.S.
- Occupations: Director; writer; designer
- Years active: 1995–present
- Spouse: Miranda July (m. 2009; sep. 2022)
- Children: 1

Michael Chadbourne Mills (born March 20, 1966) is an American film and music video director, writer and graphic designer. He made his directorial debut with Thumbsucker (2005). His other films include Beginners (2010), 20th Century Women (2016), and C'mon, C'mon (2021). He was nominated for an Academy Award for Best Original Screenplay for 20th Century Women.

== Early life and education ==
Michael Chadbourne Mills was born in Berkeley, California, the son of Paul Chadbourne Mills, an art historian and museum director, and Janet L. Dowd, a draftsperson.

He graduated from Cooper Union in Lower Manhattan, New York City.

== Career ==
Mills has created music videos for acts including Moby, Yoko Ono and Air. Air named the fifth song on its album Talkie Walkie after Mills. He has also worked as a graphic designer on promotional material and album covers for such acts as Beastie Boys, Beck, Sonic Youth, They Might Be Giants, and Ol' Dirty Bastard. He has created graphics for X-Girl, Marc Jacobs, and produces his own line of posters and fabrics, called Humans by Mike Mills. Mills played guitar and performed background vocals with the short-lived indie rock band Butter 08 along with Yuka Honda and Miho Hatori of Cibo Matto, Russell Simins of the Jon Spencer Blues Explosion, and Rick Lee of Skeleton Key. The band released a self-titled album in 1996 on the now defunct Grand Royal record label.

Thumbsucker (2005) was his feature-film directorial debut, for which he also created the film posters. In 2007, Mills filmed the feature-length documentary Does Your Soul Have A Cold?, which explored the introduction of anti-depressants to Japanese culture. The film premiered at SXSW Festival and was part of IFC's documentary film series. In 2010 he directed the Focus Features independent comedy Beginners, which stars Ewan McGregor, Mélanie Laurent, and Christopher Plummer. The film is both a romantic comedy and a film about a son reflecting on his memories of his father. Amy Taubin of Film Comment called it a breakthrough, writing, "Mills treats love and loss with a disarming tenderness and a refusal of sentimentality that make Beginners, his second feature, something of an anomaly among male identity flicks." Plummer won the Academy Award for Best Supporting Actor for his performance.

His next feature film was the A24 coming-of-age drama 20th Century Women (2016), which stars Annette Bening, Greta Gerwig, Elle Fanning, and Billy Crudup. The film had its world premiere at the New York Film Festival and was released on December 28, 2016. The Hollywood Reporter film critic David Rooney wrote: "Mills uses some of the same devices as Beginners to illuminate his characters' cultural formation, notably historic montages of their birth years or backgrounds prior to coming together. And he also glances ahead to their future lives, after the arc of the movie. But the quilting is more seamless here because the eccentricities are so integral to the writing and performances."

He has released some of his art and photography in the books Gas Book 11 (2003) and Humans (2006). In 2009, the Berlin-based culture magazine 032c devoted an issue to Mills. For the occasion Mills was interviewed by Nick Currie, best known for his work as Momus, in a piece called "Getting Through the New Depression". In 2019, he directed the short film I Am Easy to Find starring Alicia Vikander, which accompanied the album of the same name by The National.

Mills's latest directorial feature film was the 2021 black-and-white drama C'mon C'mon, starring Joaquin Phoenix, Woody Norman, and Gaby Hoffmann. The film was distributed by A24 and had its world premiere on 2 September 2021 at Telluride Film Festival. Clarisse Loughrey of The Independent called Phoenix's performance "a career best" and called Mills as "a master of intimate, unforced emotion and the kind of simple wisdom that always sounds best when it’s coming from the minds of children".

== Influences ==
Mills has cited as influences Alain Resnais, François Truffaut, Yasujirō Ozu, Ermanno Olmi, Woody Allen, and Jim Jarmusch.

== Personal life ==
Mills's mother died of brain cancer in 1999. Six months after she died, his father Paul came out as gay at the age of 75, after 45 years of marriage, which inspired his film, Beginners; five years later, Paul died of cancer.

Mills married fellow artist and film director Miranda July in 2009, with whom he has a child, born in 2012. In 2022, July announced that she and Mills were separated, although they continue to live near each other and co-parent.

== Filmography ==
=== Feature films ===
Year	Title	Notes
1999	Air: Eating, Sleeping, Waiting and Playing	Documentary film
2005	Thumbsucker	
2007	Does Your Soul Have A Cold?	Documentary film
2010	Beginners	
2016	20th Century Women	
2021	C'mon C'mon	

=== Short films ===
Year	Title	Notes
1995	An Introduction to Harmolodics	
1995	Skating with Dave and Jared	
1998	Hair Shoes Love and Honesty	
1999	The Architecture of Reassurance	
2000	Not How Or When Or Why But Yes	
2000	Deformer	
2001	Paperboys	Documentary
2019	I Am Easy to Find	

=== Music videos ===
Year	Title	Artist(s)
1995	"Men in Black"	Frank Black
1996	"2 Kindsa Love"	Jon Spencer Blues Explosion
1997	"Le soleil est près de moi"	Air
1997	"Hey Hey You Say"	Papas Fritas
1997	"Spokes"	Pond
1998	"Afrodiziak"	Bran Van 3000
1998	"All I Need"	Air
1998	"Kelly Watch the Stars"	Air
1998	"Sexy Boy"	Air
1998	"Party Hard"	Pulp
1998	"Legacy"	Mansun
1999	"Temperamental"	Everything but the Girl
1999	"Sometimes"	Les Rhythmes Digitales
1999	"Run On"	Moby
1999	"1, 2, 3, 4"	Titán
2001	"Bad Ambassador"	The Divine Comedy
2001	"It's Automatic"	Zoot Woman
2002	"Concrete Sky"	Beth Orton
2003	"Stardust"	Martin Gore
2003	"Walking on Thin Ice"	Yoko Ono
2007	"The Dress"	Blonde Redhead
2007	"My Impure Hair"	Blonde Redhead
2007	"Silently"	Blonde Redhead
2007	"Top Ranking"	Blonde Redhead
2019	"Light Years"	The National
2019	"Hairpin Turns"	The National
2019	"Hey Rosey"	The National
2025	"Psycho Killer"	Talking Heads
2026	"Big Beautiful Sound"	Dana Margolin

== Other works ==
=== Record sleeves ===
- "Kelly Watch the Stars" single – Air
- "Moon Safari" – Air
- "Playground Love" single – Air
- "Sexy Boy" single – Air
- "The Virgin Suicides" soundtrack – Air
- "Root Down" EP – Beastie Boys
- "Hot Sauce Committee Part Two" – Beastie Boys
- "Boss Hog" – Boss Hog
- "Socks, Drugs, and Rock and Roll" – Buffalo Daughter
- "Butter 08" – Butter 08
- "Viva! La Woman" – Cibo Matto
- "Runaway" single – Deee-Lite
- "Thank You Everyday" single – Deee-Lite
- "Infinity Within" – Deee-Lite
- "I Had a Dream I Was Falling Through a Hole in the Ozone Layer" single – Deee-Lite
- "Figure 8" promo – Elliott Smith
- "Experimental Remixes" – Jon Spencer Blues Explosion
- "Shimmy Shimmy Ya" single – Ol' Dirty Bastard
- "Tone Dialing" – Ornette Coleman & Prime Time
- "Junta" – Phish
- "A Picture of Nectar" – Phish
- "Rift" – Phish
- "Promise Me Nothing" – Repercussions
- "Logan's Sanctuary" – Roger Joseph Manning Jr. & Brian Reitzell
- "Lose Control" – Silk
- "No Cities to Love" – Sleater-Kinney
- "Washing Machine" – Sonic Youth
- "The Diamond Sea" single – Sonic Youth
- "Little Trouble Girl" single – Sonic Youth
- "Superfriends" – Sweet Water
- "Back to Skull" – They Might Be Giants
- "John Henry" – They Might Be Giants
- "Thumbsucker" soundtrack – Tim DeLaughter & The Polyphonic Spree
- "Wild Flag" – Wild Flag
- "Future Crimes" b/w "Glass Tambourine" single – Wild Flag

=== Commercials ===
- Adidas "Forever Sport"
- Apple Computer
- CareerBuilder "Self Help Yourself"
- Cisco "Tomorrow"
- Clos19 "Bring Them In"
- DuPont
- Facebook "Our Friends Manifesto"
- Facebook "Friend Request"
- Gap "Cool"
- Gap "Mambo"
- Mastercard
- Nike
- Old Spice "Fiji"
- Saturn "Numbers"
- Tempur-Pedic "Bear"
- Tempur-Pedic "Cloud"
- Volkswagen "Tree"
- Volkswagen "Bubble Boy"

== Awards and nominations ==
Year	Award	Category	Nominated work	Result	Ref
2001	Santa Fe Film Festival	Best Documentary	Paperboys	Won	
2005	Sundance Film Festival	Grand Jury Prize	Thumbsucker	Nominated	
2005	Berlin International Film Festival	Golden Bear	Thumbsucker	Nominated	
2006	Independent Spirit Awards	Best First Feature	Thumbsucker	Nominated	
2011	SXSW Film Festival	Audience Awards	Beginners	Nominated	
2011	Independent Spirit Awards	Best Director	Beginners	Nominated	
2011	Independent Spirit Awards	Best Screenplay	Beginners	Nominated	
2011	Gotham Awards	Best Feature	Beginners	Won	
2011	Alliance of Women Film Journalists	Best Original Screenplay	Beginners	Nominated	
2011	Detroit Film Critics Society	Best Original Screenplay	Beginners	Nominated	
2011	Kansas City Film Critics Circle Awards	Best Original Screenplay	Beginners	Won	
2011	Phoenix Film Critics Society Awards	Best Original Screenplay	Beginners	Nominated	
2011	San Diego Film Critics Society	Best Original Screenplay	Beginners	Nominated	
2011	Utah Film Critics Association Awards	Best Original Screenplay	Beginners	Nominated	
2016	Academy Awards	Best Original Screenplay	20th Century Women	Nominated	
2016	Independent Spirit Award	Best Screenplay	20th Century Women	Nominated	
2016	Alliance of Women Film Journalists	Best Original Screenplay	20th Century Women	Nominated	
2016	Austin Film Critics Association	Best Original Screenplay	20th Century Women	Nominated	
2016	Florida Film Critics Circle	Best Screenplay	20th Century Women	Nominated	
2016	Dorian Awards	Screenplay of the Year	20th Century Women	Nominated	
2016	Hawaii Film Critics Society	Best Original Screenplay	20th Century Women	Nominated	
2016	North Carolina Film Critics Association	Best Original Screenplay	20th Century Women	Nominated	
2021	SCAD Savannah Film Festival	Auteur Award	20th Century Women	Won	

== Bibliography ==
- Gas Book 11 (2003)
- Thumbsucker (2005)
- Humans (2006)
- Fireworks (2008)
- Graphics Films (2009)
- Drawings From the Film Beginners (2011)
