= Love 2 =

2009 studio album by Air

Studio album by Air
- Released: 30 September 2009
- Studio: Atlas (Paris)
- Genres: Electronica; space rock
- Length: 46:06
- Label: Virgin
- Producer: Air

Air chronology
| Pocket Symphony (2007) | Love 2 (2009) | Le voyage dans la lune (2012) |

Singles from Love 2
- 1. "Sing Sang Sung" Released: 25 August 2009; 2. "So Light Is Her Footfall" Released: 26 February 2010

Professional ratings
Aggregate scores
| Source | Rating |
|---|---|
| AnyDecentMusic? | 6.1/10 |
| Metacritic | 65/100 |
Review scores
| Source | Rating |
| AllMusic | 4/5 stars |
| The A.V. Club | B |
| Chicago Tribune | 3.5/4 stars |
| The Independent | 3/5 stars |
| Mojo | 3/5 stars |
| Pitchfork | 4.0/10 |
| Rolling Stone | 3/5 stars |
| Spin | 7/10 |
| The Times | 4/5 stars |
| URB | 4.5/5 stars |

Love 2 is the fifth studio album by French electronic music duo Air, released on 30 September 2009 in Japan and in the first week of October in the rest of the world by Virgin Records. It is the duo's first production recorded at their own recording facility, Studio Atlas, in northern Paris. As of February 2012, Love 2 had sold 24,000 copies in the United States, according to Nielsen SoundScan.

== Release ==
On 6 July 2009, a viral single, "Do the Joy", was made available as a free download to existing Air newsletter subscribers. The album's official lead single, "Sing Sang Sung", was released digitally on 25 August 2009. An album mashup was made available to UK newsletter subscribers on 14 September 2009. The album was streamed worldwide for an interactive "listening party" on 28 September 2009, starting at 12:00 CET, for exactly 24 hours. Track names were not shown, but the album was played in order. Fans were also given the opportunity to comment on the album via Facebook, and their comments were displayed adjacent to the media player, as well as an updating Google Maps view of where listeners were.

== Track listing ==
All music is composed by Air, except "Au fond du rêve doré" by Françoise Hardy.

| No. | Title | Length |
|---|---|---|
| 1. | "Do the Joy" | 3:05 |
| 2. | "Love" | 2:44 |
| 3. | "So Light Is Her Footfall" | 3:13 |
| 4. | "Be a Bee" | 3:46 |
| 5. | "Missing the Light of the Day" | 4:25 |
| 6. | "Tropical Disease" | 6:49 |
| 7. | "Heaven's Light" | 3:53 |
| 8. | "Night Hunter" | 4:14 |
| 9. | "Sing Sang Sung" | 3:06 |
| 10. | "Eat My Beat" | 2:45 |
| 11. | "You Can Tell It to Everybody" | 4:09 |
| 12. | "African Velvet" | 3:48 |

Japanese edition bonus track
| No. | Title | Length |
|---|---|---|
| 13. | "Indian Summer" | 6:04 |

European iTunes Store bonus track
| No. | Title | Length |
|---|---|---|
| 13. | "Au fond du rêve doré" (featuring Françoise Hardy) | 2:01 |

US iTunes Store deluxe edition bonus tracks
| No. | Title | Length |
|---|---|---|
| 13. | "Au fond du rêve doré" (featuring Françoise Hardy) | 2:01 |
| 14. | "Danger Zone" | 3:58 |
| 15. | "The Dream of Yi" | 5:28 |
| 16. | "Love 2 Meet You" (video) | 11:49 |

== Personnel ==
Credits adapted from the liner notes of Love 2.

- Air – production
- Joey Waronker – drums, percussions (tracks 1, 2, 4, 6, 8–12)
- Stéphane "Alf" Briat – mixing (tracks 1–7, 9–12)
- Louis Arlette – sound engineering
- Chab – mastering
- Luciana Val and Franco Musso – photos
- Laurent Pinon – artwork

== Charts ==
Chart performance for Love 2
| Chart (2009) | Peak position |
|---|---|
| Australian Albums (ARIA) | 58 |
| Austrian Albums (Ö3 Austria) | 56 |
| Belgian Albums (Ultratop Flanders) | 15 |
| Belgian Albums (Ultratop Wallonia) | 18 |
| Croatian International Albums (HDU) | 32 |
| Dutch Albums (Album Top 100) | 43 |
| European Albums (Billboard) | 27 |
| French Albums (SNEP) | 12 |
| German Albums (Offizielle Top 100) | 39 |
| Irish Albums (IRMA) | 30 |
| Italian Albums (FIMI) | 48 |
| Scottish Albums (Official Charts) | 43 |
| Swiss Albums (Schweizer Hitparade) | 15 |
| UK Albums (Official Charts) | 36 |
| US Billboard 200 | 100 |
| US Top Dance Albums (Billboard) | 5 |

2026 chart performance for Love 2
| Chart (2026) | Peak position |
|---|---|
| Hungarian Physical Albums (MAHASZ) | 40 |
