= Everybody Hertz =

Remix album by Air
- Released: 19 February 2002
- Length: 45:00
- Label: Source/Virgin France; 7 24381 18330 4

Professional ratings
Aggregate scores
Source	Rating
Metacritic	50/100
Review scores
Source	Rating
AllMusic	2/5 stars
Christgau’s Consumer Guide	(dud)
Drowned in Sound	4/10
NME	4/10
Q	4/5 stars
Rolling Stone	2/5 stars
Uncut	5/10
URB	3.5/5 stars

Everybody Hertz is a remix album by French music duo Air, first released in 2002. It contains remixed versions of songs from their 10 000 Hz Legend album. The remixes are mostly by other artists, including a version of "Don't Be Light" by The Neptunes.

The title is a pun on the R.E.M. song "Everybody Hurts".

== Track listing ==
1. "Don't Be Light" (Edit)
2. "Don't Be Light" (Mr. Oizo Remix)
3. "How Does It Make You Feel?" (Adrian Sherwood Version)
4. "Don't Be Light" (Neptunes Remix)
5. "People in the City" (Modjo Version)
6. "Don't Be Light" (The Hacker Remix)
7. "How Does It Make You Feel?" (Edit)
8. "Don't Be Light" (Malibu Remix)
9. "People in the City" (Jack Lahana Remix)
10. "The Way You Look Tonight"
11. "Flowerhead" (Bonus Track for Japan)

The CD also includes a video of Air performing "People in the City" at the Mayan Theatre on 12 July 2001.
