= Solar Bears (musical duo) =

Solar Bears were an electronic music duo from Ireland, composed of John Kowalski and Rian Trench.

Solar Bears' members hail from Dublin and Wicklow. The band's name was taken from the film Solaris by Andrei Tarkovsky. After releasing a vinyl-only EP, the band issued its debut full-length, She Was Coloured In, late in 2010.

In October 2016, the band announced their breakup via a statement to electronic music site Thump.

== Discography ==
- Inner Sunshine EP (Planet Mu, 2010)
- She Was Coloured In (Planet Mu, 2010)
- Supermigration (Planet Mu, 2013)
- Advancement (Sunday Best Recordings, 2016)
