= Nicolas Godin =

French musician (born 1969)

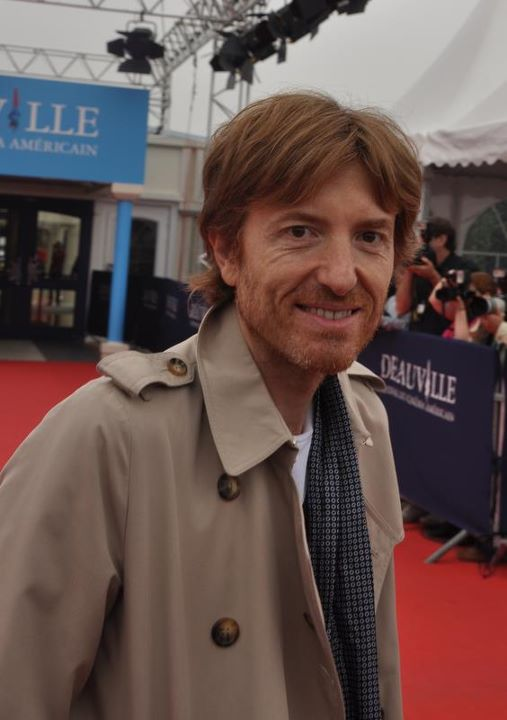
- Godin at Deauville American Film Festival 2011

Background information
- Born: 25 December 1969 (age 56); Le Chesnay, Île-de-France, France
- Genres: Electronic, downtempo, space rock
- Occupations: Musician, songwriter
- Instruments: Keyboards, bass guitar, guitar, vocals, vocoder, harmonica, shamisen, koto, drums, banjo
- Years active: 1995–present
- Labels: Virgin, Because Music
- Website: www.aircheology.com

Nicolas Godin (born 25 December 1969) is a French musician best known for being one half of the music duo Air.

== Early life ==
Godin was born in Le Chesnay, Île-de-France, France. He studied architecture at the École Nationale Supérieure d'Architecture de Versailles, where he met Jean-Benoît Dunckel, a mathematics student. They soon became musical partners in Air.

Before founding Air, Godin played in the band Orange, with others such as Jean-Benoît Dunckel, Alex Gopher, Xavier Jamaux, and Jean de Reydellet. He and Dunckel have been working together since they were teenagers in the 1980s at university.

== Early career ==
Contrary to popular belief, the name of the band Air does not stand for "Amour, Imagination, Rêve" (love, imagination, dream), but rather for description of their music which the duo describes as "airy" (in French aérien). In the beginning, it was a one‑person project. Godin, then an architecture student and amateur musician, was asked by a childhood friend to write a song for a compilation to be released by Source, a small French independent label. "Modulor Mix", a tribute to Le Corbusier, was recorded on Godin's Portastudio, and appeared on the Source Lab album in 1995. With several remixes, it was re‑released on British label Mo' Wax in 1996.

== Air ==
Following this small success, Godin asked his friend Jean-Benoît Dunckel, a classically trained pianist, to join him in Air. Together, they produced further 'maxi‑singles' for Source, with titles like "J'ai Dormi Sous L'eau", "Les Professionnels", "Casanova 70" and "Le Soleil Est Près De Moi". Finally, in 1997, Source asked Air to record a whole album. The duo spent several months in a recording studio near Paris called Studio de Saint‑Nom, and asked a friend—freelance engineer and former Plus XXX assistant Stéphane 'Alf' Briat—to work as a sound engineer on that project.

Their full-length debut studio album Moon Safari, released in 1998, was propelled to chart success by the singles "Sexy Boy", "Kelly Watch the Stars" and "All I Need". Its mixture of synths, strings and guitar made it a unique release in the electronic music genre at the time. Moon Safari went platinum in the United Kingdom and gold in France.

== Solo projects ==
On 18 September 2015, Godin released his first solo album Contrepoint (Because Music), inspired by the music of Johann Sebastian Bach. Godin composed the soundtrack for French series A Very Secret Service (2015–2018). Godin released his second studio album Concrete and Glass on 24 January 2020 via Because Music. In 2022 he composed and performed music for the documentary film Fire of Love.

== Discography ==
=== Albums ===
Title	Year	Peak positions		
Title	Year	FRA	BEL (Fl)	BEL (Wa)
Contrepoint	2015	75	95	43
Concrete and Glass	2020	149	—	—
