= Jean-Benoît Dunckel =

French musician

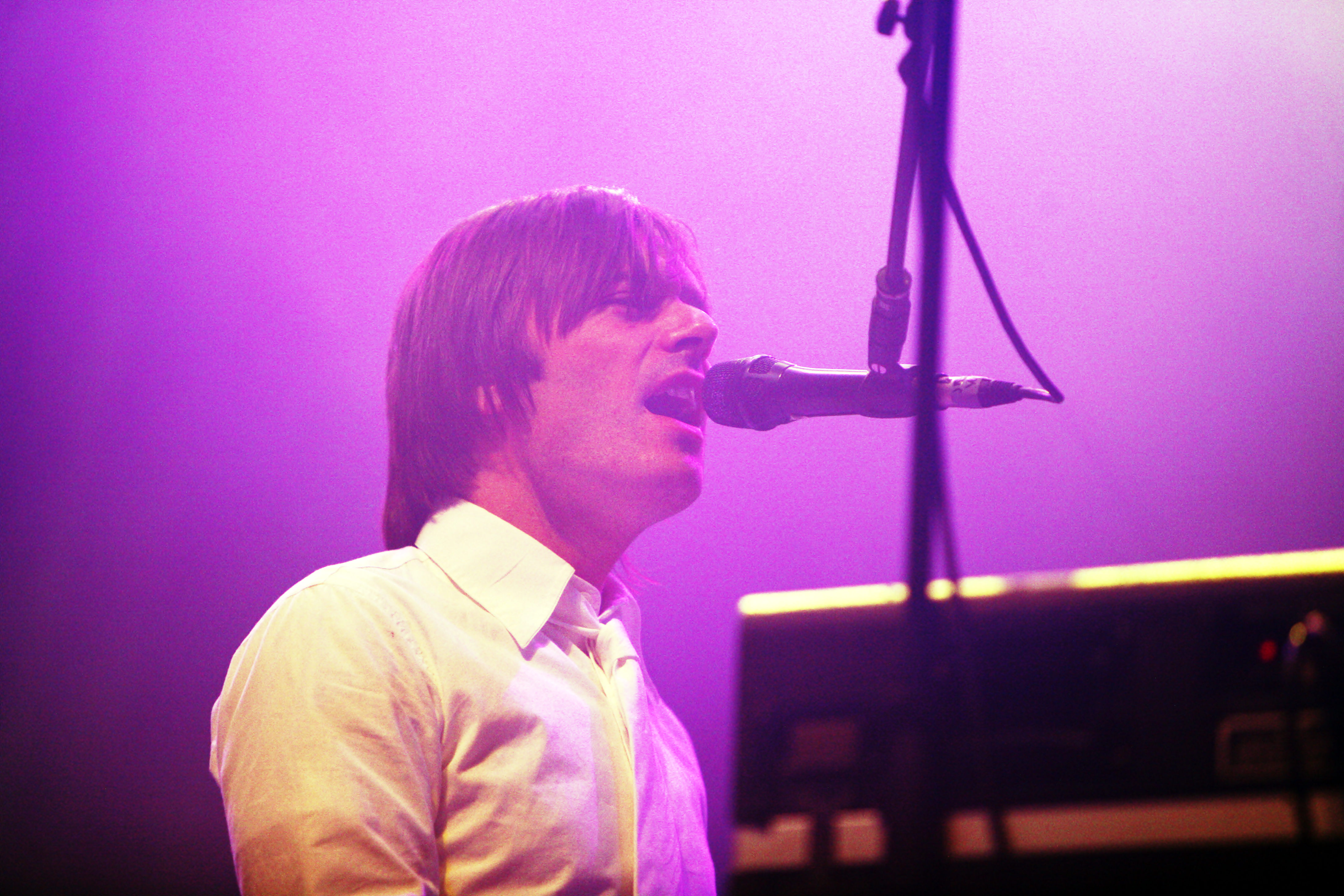
- Jean-Benoît Dunckel performing in 2010 as one half of Air

Background information
- Born: 7 September 1969 (age 56); Versailles, Île-de-France, France
- Genres: Electronic, downtempo, space rock
- Occupations: Musician, songwriter, composer
- Instruments: Vocals, synthesizer, drums, percussion
- Website: jbdunckel.com

Jean-Benoît Dunckel-Barbier (born 7 September 1969) is a French musician best known for being one half of the French music duo Air, along with Nicolas Godin.

In the 1980s, he formed the band Orange with Alex Gopher, Xavier Jamaux and Jean de Reydellet. He studied mathematics and physics and taught at a middle school in Paris, before embarking on a career as a professional musician. Since 1995, he has been one of two members of the band Air, along with his partner Nicolas Godin.

Working under the name Darkel, he released his first solo album, titled Darkel, in September 2006.

In 2011, he formed the electronic side project Tomorrow's World with Lou Hayter of New Young Pony Club. Tomorrow's World, their first album, was released in 2013.

Dunckel collaborated with Icelander Barði Jóhannsson under the name Starwalker and released an EP in March 2014, featuring "Losers Can Win" and "Bad Weather". A new song not featured on the EP was issued in November 2014, titled "Blue Hawaii". In April 2016, a self-titled, full-length album was released.

In March 2015, he issued the four-track mini-album titled The Man of Sorrow. Also in 2015, he composed the soundtrack for the film The Summer of Sangailé. The soundtrack album was released on 24 July.

In 2018, he released his second full-length solo album titled H+ under Jive Epic records.

Four years later, in June 2022, Dunckel released the full-length studio album Carbon, under his own label Prototyp. On the album (theme) Dunckel suggests technology could save the world. AllMusic gave the album in its review 3.5 (out of 5) stars. About the album title Carbon, Dunckel said: "When you burn it, it doesn't go away, It's full of strength - diamonds are crystallized carbon. Carbon is the thing that makes you solid. It's the most important thing in our bodies and in our lives, but we're hardly aware of it."

In 2024, Dunckel composed the score for the film The Good Teacher, directed by Teddy Lussi-Modeste.

== Discography ==
=== Albums ===
- Darkel (2006)
- H+ (2018)
- Carbon (2022)
- Möbius Morphosis (2024)
- Paranormal Musicality (2024)

=== EPs ===
- The Man of Sorrow (2015)

=== Soundtracks ===
- Cyprien (fr) (2009)
- The Summer of Sangailé (2015)
- Swagger (fr) (2016)
- K.O. (fr) (2017)
- Mythomaniac (2019)
- Capital in the Twenty-First Century (2020)
- Poissonsexe (fr) (2020)
- Summer of 85 (2020)
- Normale (fr) (2023)
- For Night Will Come (2023)
- The Good Teacher (2024)

=== Collaborations ===
- Tomorrow's World, with Lou Hayter (2013)
- Starwalker, with Barði Jóhannsson (2016)
- Mirages, with Jonathan Fitoussi (2019)
- Mirages 2, with Jonathan Fitoussi (2025)
