= Jean-François Balmer =

Swiss film, television, and theater actor

- Jean-François Balmer in 2025
- Born: 18 April 1946 (age 80); Valangin, Switzerland
- Occupations: Actor, television series
- Years active: 1972-present

Jean-François Balmer (born 18 April 1946 in Valangin) is a Swiss actor. He has worked extensively in French cinema, television and stage productions since the early 1970s.

== Theater ==
Year	Title	Author	Director
1972	The Imaginary Invalid	Molière	Jean-Laurent Cochet
1973	Scapin the Schemer	Molière	Jacques Weber
1974	La Mandore	Romain Weingarten	Daniel Benoin
1974	Folies bourgeoises	Roger Planchon	Roger Planchon
1974	Les Ressources naturelles	Pierre Laville	André-Louis Perinetti
1975–76	Rameau's Nephew	Denis Diderot	Jacques Weber
1975–76	A.A., Théâtres d’Arthur Adamov	Roger Planchon	Roger Planchon
1976	Collaborators	John Mortimer	Andréas Voutsinas
1977	Mercredi trois quarts	Helvio Soto	Maurice Garrel
1980	Attends que je me lève	Philippe Adrien	Guy Seligmann
1980–81	The Marriage of Figaro	Pierre Beaumarchais	Françoise Petit
1981	Chaine conjugale	Pierre Laville	Gérard Follin
1986	The Misanthrope	Molière	Françoise Petit
1986–87	Pour un oui ou pour un non	Nathalie Sarraute	Simone Benmussa
1989–91	Una notte di Casanova	Franco Cuomo	Françoise Petit
1992	Mystification	Denis Diderot	Jacques Weber
1992–93	Dear Liar	Jerome Kilty	Isabelle Rattier
1994–95	Pierre Dac, mon maître soixante-trois	Pierre Dac	Jérôme Savary
1995–96	Le Faiseur	Honoré de Balzac	Françoise Petit
1998–99	Pour un oui ou pour un non	Nathalie Sarraute	Simone Benmussa
2000–02	Novecento	Alessandro Baricco	Frank Cassenti
2003–04	Baudelaire dit par Balmer	Charles Baudelaire	Françoise Petit
2007–08	Le Talisman	Honoré de Balzac	Françoise Petit
2007–08	Débats 1974-1981	Valéry Giscard d'Estaing & François Mitterrand	Jacques Weber
2010–12	Henri IV, le bien aimé	Daniel Colas	Daniel Colas
2011–14	Journey to the End of the Night	Louis-Ferdinand Céline	Françoise Petit
2017–18	Le Voyageur	Pablo Neruda	Françoise Petit
2017–18	À droite à gauche	Laurent Ruquier	Steve Suissa
2018–20	Le CV de Dieu	Jean-Louis Fournier	Françoise Petit
2022	Les Confessions de Beethoven	Alexandre Najjar	Françoise Petit

== Filmography ==
=== Cinema ===
Year	Title	Role	Director	Notes
1972	Repeated Absences	The waiter	Guy Gilles	
1973	R.A.S.	Raymond Dax	Yves Boisset	
1974	Love at the Top	Vischenko	Michel Deville	
1975	Fear Over the City	Julien Dallas	Henri Verneuil	
1976	Little Marcel	Pottier	Jacques Fansten	
1976	The Castaways of Turtle Island	The Big Boss	Jacques Rozier	
1977	La Menace	Inspector Waldeck	Alain Corneau	
1978	Passe montagne	Georges's colleague	Jean-François Stévenin	
1979	Cop or Hood	Inspector Massard	Georges Lautner	
1979	The Adolescent	André	Jeanne Moreau	
1979	Rien ne va plus	The diner guest	Jean-Michel Ribes	
1979	Les Égouts du paradis	68	José Giovanni	
1979	Ils sont grands ces petits	Monestier	Joël Santoni	
1981	Neige	The second Inspector	Juliet Berto & Jean-Henri Roger	
1981	Strange Affair	Paul Belais	Pierre Granier-Deferre	
1982	The Good Soldier	Lawyer	Franco Brusati	
1982	Le quart d'heure américain	François-Albert	Philippe Galland	
1983	L'africain	Paul Planchet	Philippe de Broca	
1983	La derelitta	The mailman	Jean-Pierre Igoux	
1984	Polar	Eugène Tarpon	Jacques Bral	
1984	Les fauves	Jeff Garcia	Jean-Louis Daniel	
1984	Swann in Love	Dr. Cottard	Volker Schlöndorff	
1985	Urgence	Paul Murneau	Gilles Béhat	
1985	Le transfuge	Captain Pierre Clément	Philippe Lefebvre	
1985	Folie suisse	Carl	Christine Lipinska	
1985	L'amour ou presque	Albert	Patrice Gautier	
1986	The Last Image	Miller	Mohammed Lakhdar-Hamina	
1986	Golden Eighties	Monsieur Jean	Chantal Akerman	
1989	La Révolution française	Louis XVI	Robert Enrico & Richard T. Heffron	
1990	Bal perdu	Jérôme Dentrain	Daniel Benoin	
1991	Madame Bovary	Charles Bovary	Claude Chabrol	
1992	Sam suffit	Albert	Virginie Thévenet	
1992	La fenêtre	Roberto	Monique Champagne	
1992	Dien Bien Phu	AFP employee	Pierre Schoendoerffer	
1992	Desencuentros	Peter Monti	Leandro Manfrini	
1993	Vent d'est	Father Anton Siegler	Robert Enrico	
1993	Mauvais garçon	The evaluating president	Jacques Bral	
1994	Ma soeur chinoise	Paul Bricou	Alain Mazars	
1994	Twist à Popenguine	Monsieur Benoit	Moussa Sene Absa	
1994	La lumière des étoiles mortes	Pierre	Charles Matton	
1996	Beaumarchais	Antoine de Sartine	Édouard Molinaro	
1996	Le livre de cristal	John 'JB' Billeter	Patricia Plattner	
1996	XY, drôle de conception	Dr Lamauve	Jean-Paul Lilienfeld	
1997	The Swindle	Monsieur K	Claude Chabrol	
1998	Le Radeau de la Méduse	Napoleon	Iradj Azimi	
1999	The Dilettante	The Court President	Pascal Thomas	
1999	Time Regained	Uncle Adolphe	Raúl Ruiz	
2000	T'aime	Paul Gontier	Patrick Sébastien	
2000	The King's Daughters	Jean Racine	Patricia Mazuy	
2001	Charmant garçon	Hector	Patrick Chesnais	
2001	Belphegor, Phantom of the Louvre	Bertrand Faussier	Jean-Paul Salomé	
2003	That Day	Treffle	Raúl Ruiz	
2003	Ripoux 3	Albert	Claude Zidi	
2006	Elephant Tales	Tahoua	Mario Andreacchio	Voice
2006	Comedy of Power	Boldi	Claude Chabrol	
2006	Un printemps à Paris	Gaspacho	Jacques Bral	
2006	Le grand appartement	The banker	Pascal Thomas	
2008	Tokyo!	Mr Voland	Leos Carax	
2009	Lucky Luke	The Governor	James Huth	
2009	Lucifer et moi	Lucifer	Jean-Jacques Grand-Jouan	
2009	La valle delle ombre	Don Rinaldo	Mihály Györik	
2010	Mumu	The priest	Joël Séria	
2011	Équinoxe	The fisherman	Laurent Carcélès	
2012	Dead Europe	Gerry	Tony Krawitz	
2012	In the House	The principal	François Ozon	
2012	La ville est calme	The voice	Alexandre Labarussiat	Short
2014	Les assoiffés	M. Duplessy	Sylvère Petit	Short
2015	Cosmos	Léon	Andrzej Żuławski	
2016	Dieumerci!	Ventura	Lucien Jean-Baptiste	
2020	Waiting for Anya	Narrator	Ben Cookson	
2020	Closing Night	The director	Matthieu Moerlen	Short
2023	Mise au Vert	Léon	Yohann Charrin	
2024	O Pior Homem de Londres	Count Henri de Pourtalès	Rodrigo Areias	

=== Television ===
Year	Title	Role	Director	Notes
1974	Gil Blas de Santillane	The rider	Jean-Roger Cadet	TV mini-series
1977	Le chandelier	Clavaroche	Claude Santelli	TV movie
1977	Bonheur, impair et passe	Ladislas	Roger Vadim	TV movie
1979	Brigade des mineurs	Michel	Peter Kassovitz	TV series (1 episode)
1980	Une page d'amour	Father Jouve	Élie Chouraqui	TV movie
1980	Les amours du mal-aimé	Guillaume Apollinaire	Marcel Camus	TV movie
1983	Par ordre du Roy	Monsieur Tiquet	Michel Mitrani	TV movie
1983	Les poneys sauvages	Barry Roots	Robert Mazoyer	TV mini-series
1984	Le scénario défendu	Serge Rossmann	Michel Mitrani	TV movie
1984	The Blood of Others	Arnaud	Claude Chabrol	TV movie
1985	Le roi de la Chine	Grégor Vartanian	Fabrice Cazeneuve	TV movie
1987	Visa pour nulle part	Julien Costa	Alain Bloch	TV movie
1988	Médecins des hommes	Marc	Jacques Perrin	TV series (1 episode)
1988	Espionne et tais-toi	Colonel Malone	Claude Boissol	TV series (7 episodes)
1989	En attendant Godot	Estragon	Walter D. Asmus	TV movie
1989	L'or du diable	Bérenger Saunière	Jean-Louis Fournier	TV mini-series
1991	Police Secrets	Ravier	Yves Lafaye	TV series (1 episode)
1993	Spender	Inspector Calliere	Matt Forrest	TV series (1 episode)
1993	Antoine Rives, le juge du terrorisme	Renaud de Mareuil	Philippe Lefebvre	TV series (2 episodes)
1994	Le misanthrope	Alceste	Mathias Ledoux	TV movie
1995	Arithmétique appliquée et impertinente	The professor	Jean-Louis Fournier	TV movie
1996	Le dernier chant	François Berthier	Claude Goretta	TV movie
1996	La pitié du diable	Monsieur S	Ghislain Allon & Michaela Heine	TV movie
1996	Le propre de l'homme	Donald Hunt	Marc Rivière	TV movie
1997	Parfum de famille	Armand	Serge Moati	TV movie
1997	Aventurier malgré lui	Reynaud	Marc Rivière	TV movie
1997	Le censeur du lycée d'Epinal	Jean Denamur	Marc Rivière	TV movie
1997	La vérité est un vilain défaut	Bruckmann	Jean-Paul Salomé	TV movie
1998	Meurtres sans risque	Jean Dantois	Christiane Spiero	TV movie
1998	Louise et les marchés	André Farouz	Marc Rivière	TV mini-series
1999- 2015	Boulevard du Palais	Gabriel Rovère	Christian Bonnet, Thierry Petit...	TV series (55 episodes)
2000	Deutschlandspiel	François Mitterrand	Hans-Christoph Blumenberg	TV movie
2004	Bien agités !	M. Charles	Patrick Chesnais	TV movie
2004	Pierre et Jean	Henri Rolland	Daniel Janneau	TV movie
2006	Henry Dunant: Du rouge sur la croix	Arthur Thuillier	Dominique Othenin-Girard	TV movie
2007	L'affaire Sacha Guitry	Sacha Guitry	Fabrice Cazeneuve	TV movie
2007	La Française doit voter	Victor Augagneur	Fabrice Cazeneuve	TV movie
2008	Clémentine	Judge Moineau	Denys Granier-Deferre	TV movie
2009	Beauregard	Pierre Hautefort	Jean-Louis Lorenzi	TV movie
2010	Colère	The bishop	Jean-Pierre Mocky	TV movie
2010	Chateaubriand	Malesherbes	Pierre Aknine	TV movie
2011	L'Infiltré	DST director	Giacomo Battiato	TV movie
2011	Mort d'un président	Georges Pompidou	Pierre Aknine	TV movie
2012	La joie de vivre	M. Chanteau	Jean-Pierre Améris	TV movie
2018	Le Mort de la plage	Jacques Maréchal	Claude-Michel Rome	TV movie
2020	Cellule de crise	Adi Lipp	Jacob Berger	TV series (6 episodes)
2022	Diane de Poitiers	Matthieu Ory	Josée Dayan	TV movie
2022	Juliette dans son bain	Amato	Jean-Paul Lilienfeld	TV movie
2022	Capitaine Marleau	Jean Garcin	Josée Dayan	TV series (1 episode)

== Awards and nominations ==
Year	Award	Nominated work	Result
1978	César Award for Best Supporting Actor	La Menace	Nominated
1997	Molière Award for Best Actor	Le Faiseur	Nominated
2001	Molière Award for Best Actor	Novecento	Nominated
2011	Molière Award for Best Actor	Henri IV, le bien aimé	Nominated
