= Seicento =

Italian art and culture of 1600 to 1699

The Seicento (/seɪˈtʃɛntoʊ/ say-CHEN-toh; Italian: [ˌsɛiˈtʃɛnto]) is Italian history and culture during the 17th century. The Seicento saw the end of the Renaissance movement in Italy and the beginning of the Counter-Reformation and the Baroque era. The word seicento means 'six hundred' and is short for milleseicento, '1600'.

== Definition ==
The Seicento in Italy simply refers to the 17th century, yet abroad, the word refers to the Italian cultural and social history during this period, characterised by several wars and conflicts, invasions, and the patronage of the arts and architecture. It was also the period in which the Baroque era came into place (the Baroque being an essentially Italian movement, having been created by the popes in Rome as a part of the Catholic Reformation). This period also saw advancements in Italian science, philosophy and technology.

== History ==
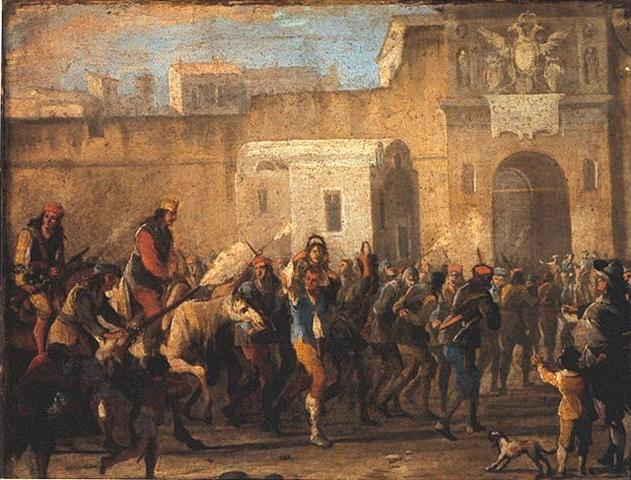
The 1647 revolt against high taxation in Naples, led and triggered by rebel Masaniello.

The 17th century was a tumultuous period in Italian history, with several political and social changes, and times of much civil and military unrest. This included the increase in number of Spanish colonies and possessions along the peninsula, and the increase in power of the pope and the Roman Catholic Church during the Counter Reformation, a counterpart of the Protestant Reformation.

Despite several artistic and scientific contributions, such as the invention of several musical instruments, stylistic genres, astronomical discoveries and the creation of the Baroque, Italy, which was the cultural leader of Europe in the 16th century, experienced a social decline, which slowly began in the beginning of the 17th century and fell towards the end of the century. This was due to persistent conflicts, revolts (such as the Neapolitan 1647 tax-related Revolt of Masaniello), invasions and the rise in popularity of French, English and Spanish culture.

In spite of that Italy was in this period at the forefront of the Scientific Revolution and witnessed the establishment of several prominent scientific societies—the Paduan Accademia dei Ricovrati (founded in 1599), the Roman Accademia dei Lincei (1603), the Florentine Accademia del Cimento (1657). In fields such as theatre (both tragedy and comedy), music (both religious and secular), art history, rhetoric, and political philosophy, Italians of this period played leading roles—the poets Giambattista Marino and Alessandro Tassoni, the composers Claudio Monteverdi and Francesco Cavalli, the art historian Giovanni Pietro Bellori, the literary theorist Emanuele Tesauro and the political theorist and statesman Giovanni Botero, to name just a few. As research into early modern Italy continues, the old Enlightenment historiography that argues for a decline into a dark age and a disjunction between the period of the Italian Renaissance and that of the 18th-century reformers dissolves.

Events which happened during this period include the 1633 papal trial of scientist Galileo Galilei, the 1647 revolt in Naples, the 1669 Etna eruption, the 1674 rebellion in Messina and the 1693 Sicily earthquake.

== Different criteria ==
=== Art ===
Italian art during the 17th century was predominantly Baroque in essence. 17th-century Italian Baroque art was similar in style and subject matter to that during the same period in Spain - characterised by rich, dark colours, and often religious themes relating notably to martyrdom, and also the presence of several still lifes. Lombard painter Caravaggio stands out as one of the most prominent from this era, known for his sacred ("Supper at Emmaus"), mythological ("Medusa"), still-life ("Basket of Fruit") genres and the common depiction of local people ("Boy carrying a Basket of Fruit). His paintings were predominantly oil, and used warm, intense colours, and usually having dramatic themes. Having one of the forefathers of Baroque art, and one of the earliest modern painters, his styles influenced other Italian and foreign artists following him, including Gian Lorenzo Bernini. Gian Lorenzo Bernini was a prominent mid to late-17th century Baroque artist and sculptor, known for his statues, such as the "Ecstasy of Saint Theresa".

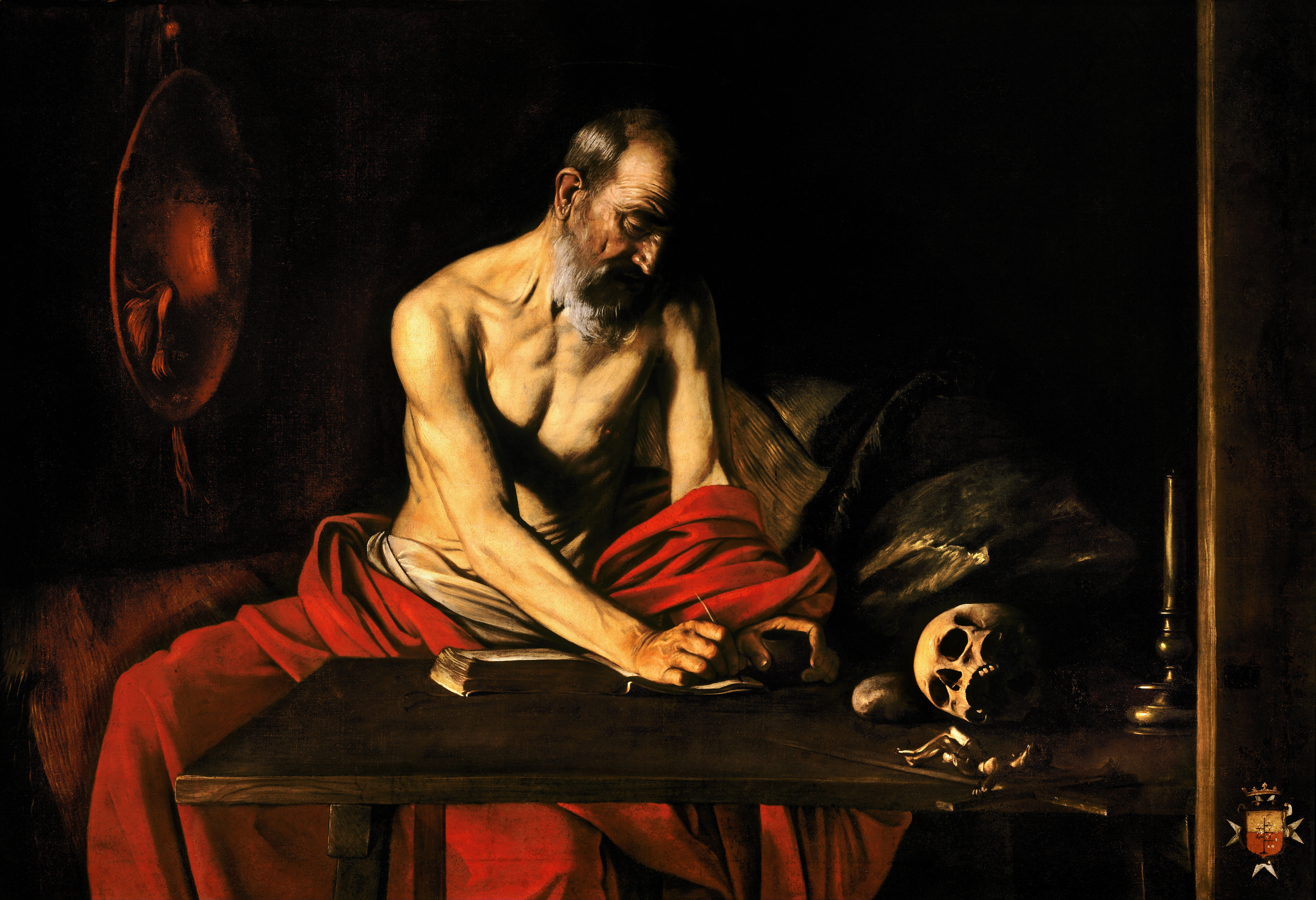
A painting of Saint Jerome dating from 1607 by Italian early-17th century painter Caravaggio. One can notice the warm colours (red, pink, peach, light-brown) used in this painting. Such styles were popular in 17th-century Italian art.

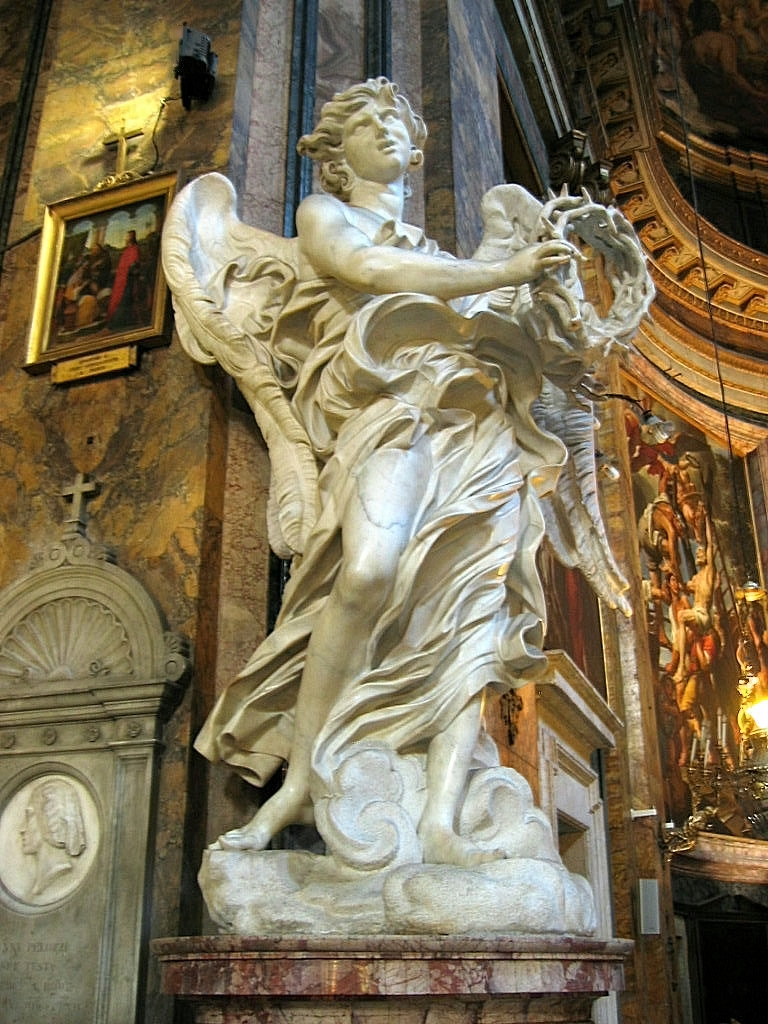
Baroque art and architecture was popular in 17th-century Italy.

=== Architecture ===
Building styles for Italian 17th-century architecture, most notably the Baroque, were very different all across the country.

Turin was well known for its French-style Baroque architecture. This began in the city during the late-17th century (1680s onwards). Before, buildings were still constructed in dark and austere brick Renaissance style, yet by the late 17th century, this style evolved into a more Baroque one, similar to that used in Paris and Versailles, characterised by gold/copper gilded roofs, Italian/French gardens, French windows and ornate decoration. Genoa still kept constructing painted houses, yet, the painted designs were more ornate and in touch with the popular Baroque designs. Milan was similar to Turin in architectural patterns and trends, yet was less influenced by French designs, and more by the Spanish ones (considering Milan was ruled by Spain). Venice started to construct more ornate Baroque buildings ever since in 1650s.

In Rome and Southern Italy, this was slightly different. Buildings in Rome were constructed in a Baroque style ever since the early-17th century, and examples of this could be St Peter's Basilica and the Palazzo Bernini. The Catholic Reformation's aim was to make Roman Catholicism look like an appealing denomination, and the popes did this by not only reforming the church's organization and society, yet also constructing ornate basilicas, fountains, piazzas (Italian squares), palaces and monuments. The architecture of Rome at the time was characterised by grandiose palaces, rich interiors, frescos and elegant cartouches. This style reached the South slightly later, towards the 1650s, and, especially in Naples and Sicily, was known for its similarity to Spanish architecture, visible in buildings such as the Certosa of San Martino in Naples.

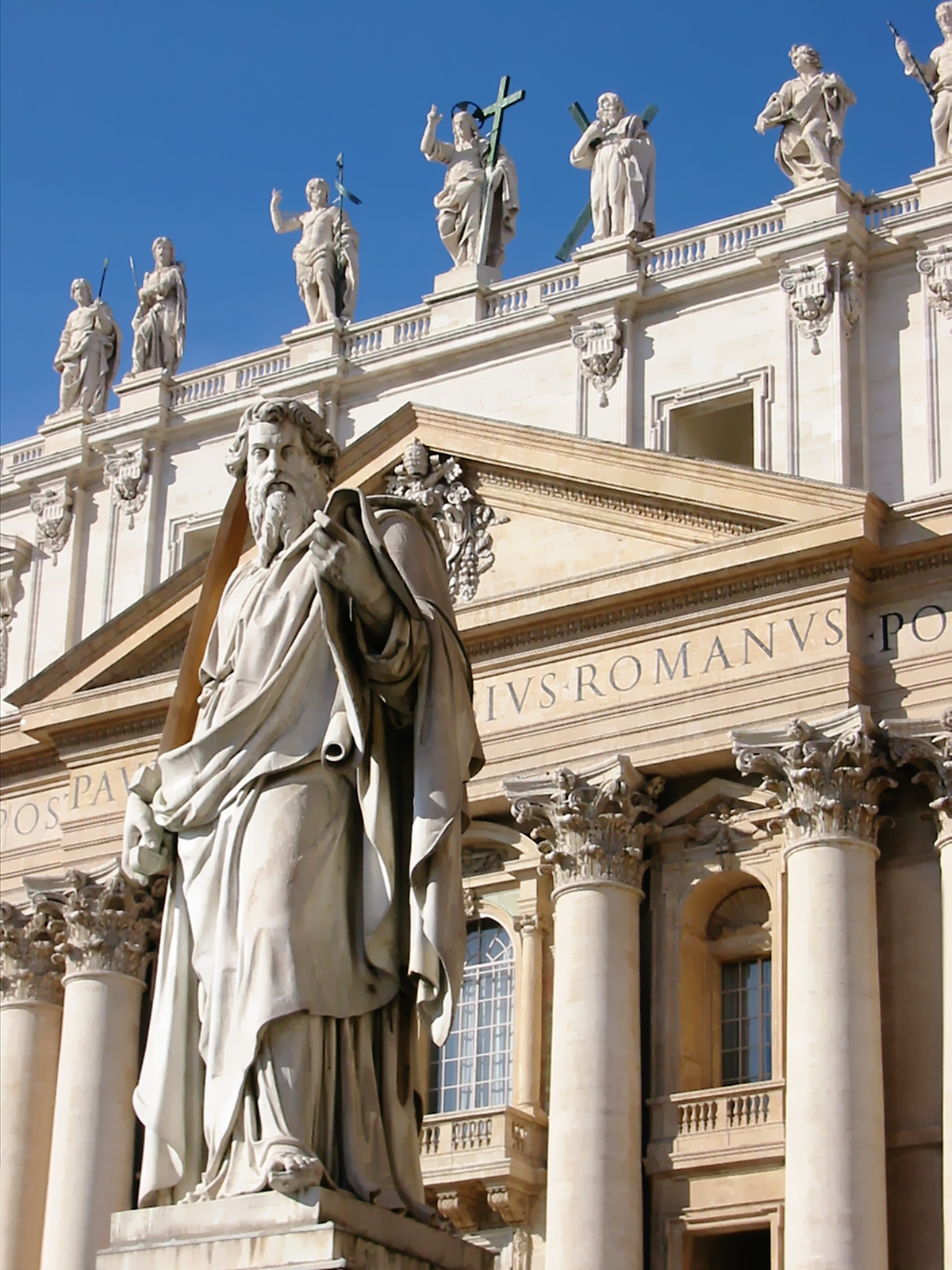
The 17th century Baroque architectural style used in St Peter's Basilica, Rome.

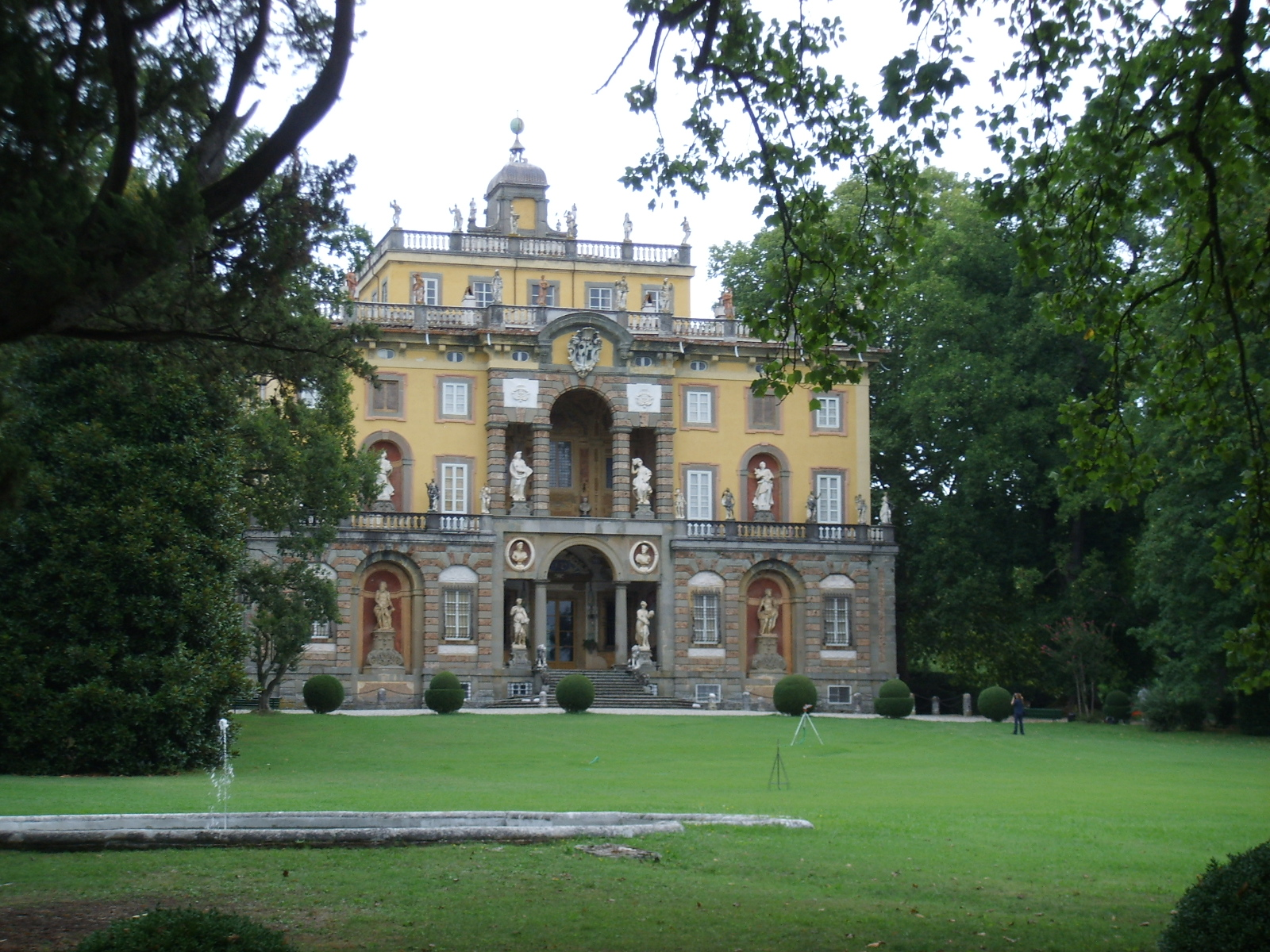
The Villa Torrigiani, found in Lucca, a country house which was founded in the late-16th century, yet whose exterior and garden date to the mid-17th century.

=== Education ===
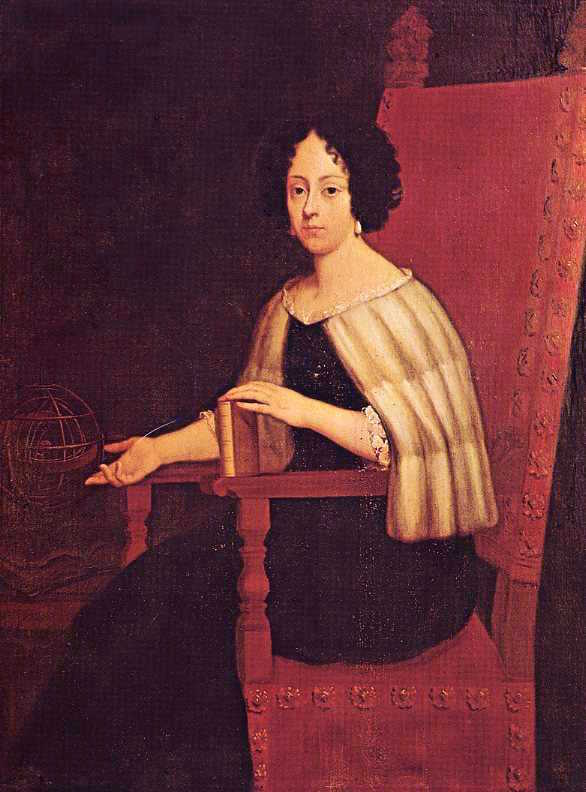
A painting of Elena Cornaro Piscopia, the first female laureate and woman to receive a PhD in the world

There were several advancements made in 17th-century Italian education systems. One example could be the admission of Elena Cornaro Piscopia into the University of Padua. A mathematician, scholar and academic, Piscopia was the first woman in the world to ever graduate with a doctorate (PhD, or doctor of philosophy) in 1678. Several universities, colleges and institutions were founded in this century, such as the University of Cagliari in 1620.

=== Fashion ===
In the 17th century, Italy saw a decline in importance as the fashion trendsetter of Europe, which it was in the 15th and 16th centuries. Despite still holding this position until the 1620s and 30s, by the 1640s, when Louis XIV gained power in France, and the popularity of dresses in Spain, the French and Spanish court tastes became more popular than the Italian ones. In the early 17th century, fashions for men and women were relatively similar to those of the 1580s and 90s.

Women used to still wear elaborate ruffs and large, elaborate dresses (the decoration depended on the wealth and social class of the women wearing it). By the 1630s, ruffs began to fall out of fashion, and these were replaced by pearl necklaces. Hair was often done up much more elaborately than before, with curls and flowers and jewels inside. The wearing of a chemise, and collar heightened in Italian female fashion in the 1650s and 60s. By the 1670s, dresses became simpler and less large than in the early 17th century, yet hair was often done up much more elaborately than before, and women began to wear mantuas and gowns. By the 1680s and 90s, women tended to wear simple or averagely decorated dresses, with a mantua, elaborate hair (often a wig), long-sleeved gloves, and often carried around a fan.

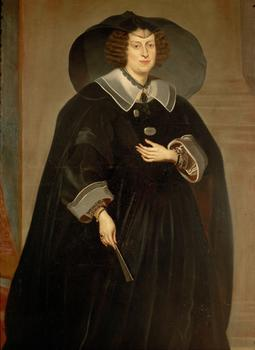
Italian female fashions in the early-17th century

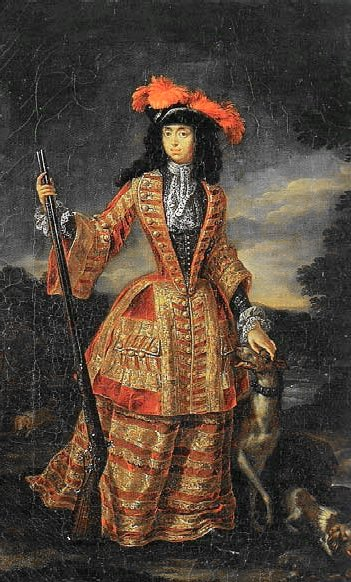
Italian female fashions in the late-17th century

In the early 17th century, male fashion too was similar to that of the late-16th century. They used to wear cuffs, short-sleeved trousers and had long hair. Most men also grew moustaches, and used to wear boots, and by the 1630s, feathered hats became popular. By the late-17th century, male fashion concentrated on highly elaborate dresses and shoes, grey curled wigs, and richly decorated petticoats and overskirts.

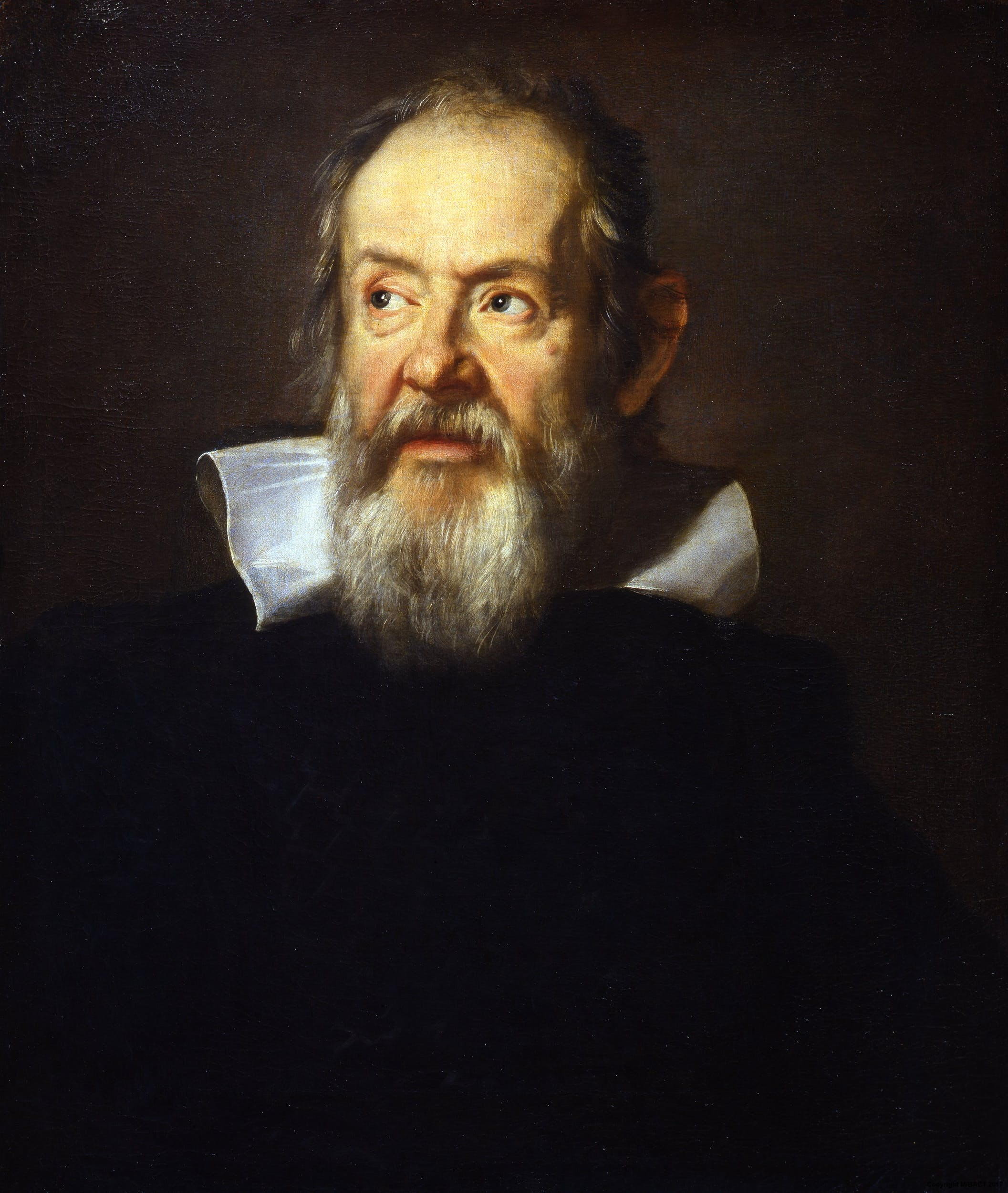
Galileo Galilei, a renowned Italian scientist and astronomer by Justus Sustermans, 1636.

=== Science and technology ===
There were several contributions to science and technology in Italy during the 17th century, which saw the development of tools, physics, astronomy and heliocentricism. Galileo Galilei's discovering of Saturn's rings, the Venus' phases, and several new technological inventions, such as his 1609 telescope and compass made for military reasons in 1604. All of this has made him renowned as one of the fathers of modern science, astronomy and technology. He also supported heliocentricism, a controversial issue, since it was viewed at the time that the planets and the Sun rotated around the Earth, not the other way round has he argued.

=== Literature and philosophy ===
According to Albert N. Mancini "while the preeminence of seventeenth-century art and music is a matter of common acceptance, the literary term secentismo [...] retains pejorative connotations that reflect a negative attitude of 18th and 19th century critics and historians". Thanks to the interest of Benedetto Croce and later that of Giovanni Getto, Carlo Calcaterra and Giovanni Pozzi, however, the fortunes of Italian baroque literature improved considerably in the postwar era. Contrary to widespread prejudice, dating back to the work of Jacob Burckhardt, authors such as Paul Grendler have documented Italy's continuing vitality in the Counter-Reformation period. Today the baroque period is widely considered "one of the most intriguing periods in modern Italy's literary and cultural history".

The seicento too saw several renowned philosophical figures. Giambattista Vico was one of the most famous. He was a Neapolitan writer and philosopher, and was known for his several books, usually regarding history, reasoning, philosophy and law. Such books include The New Science.

=== Music ===
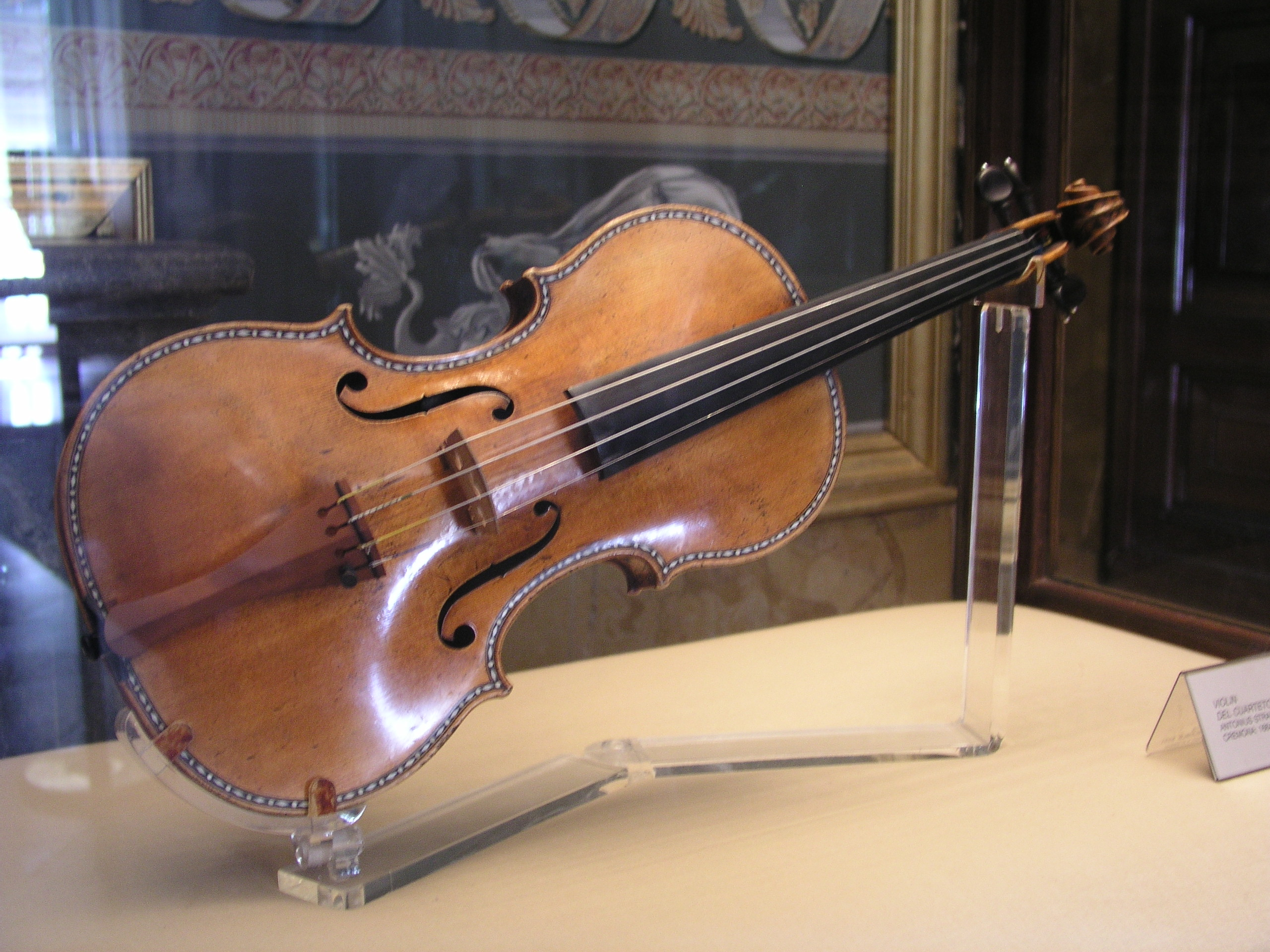
Stradivari's classical violin

Italy's musical contributions in the 17th century were amongst its greatest, including the invention of the piano in 1700, creation of new forms of the violin, and great contributions to opera, invented in Italy (Florence) in the 16th century, and the beginning of Baroque music in the country. During the 17th century, both opera and Baroque musical styles were developed. Church music was popular in this time, especially sponsored by the religiously-run musical academies and conservatories in Naples, the main centre of musical education along the peninsula. Opera composers at the time include Claudio Monteverdi. In the late-17th century, Cremona-based luthier Antonio Stradivari developed the classical violin, then called the Stradivarius after his name, and in 1700, Bartolomeo Cristofori invented the piano in Florence, Tuscany.

== See also ==
- Italian Baroque
- Early Modern Italy
- Duecento, the 13th century in Italian culture
- Trecento, the 14th century in Italian culture
- Quattrocento, the 15th century in Italian culture
- Cinquecento, the 16th century in Italian culture
- History of Italian culture (1700s), the Settecento, 18th century, in Italian culture
- Italian Neoclassical and 19th-century art, the Ottocento, 19th century, in Italian culture
- Novecento (disambiguation)
