= Cinquecento =

Italian culture and art from 1500 to 1599

The cultural and artistic events of Italy during the period 1500 to 1599 are collectively referred to as the Cinquecento (/ˌtʃɪŋkwɪˈtʃɛntoʊ/ CHING-kwih-CHEN-toh; Italian: [ˌtʃiŋkweˈtʃɛnto]), from the Italian for the number '500', in turn from millecinquecento, '1500'. Cinquecento encompasses the styles and events of the High Italian Renaissance, and Mannerism.

== Art ==
Especially in Northern Italy, artists began to use new techniques in the manipulation of light and darkness, such as the tone contrast evident in many of Titian's portraits and the development of sfumato and chiaroscuro by Leonardo da Vinci and Giorgione. The period also saw the first secular (non-religious) themes. Debate has ensued as to the secularism of the Renaissance emphasized by early 20th-century writers like Jacob Burkhardt due to the presence of these – actually few – mythological paintings. Botticelli was one of the main painters whose secular work comes down to us today, though he was deeply religious (a follower of Savonarola) and painted plenty of traditional religious paintings as well.

The period known as the High Renaissance represents the culmination of the goals of the earlier period, namely the accurate representation of figures in space rendered with credible motion and an appropriately decorous style. The most famous painters from this time period are Leonardo da Vinci, Raphael, and Michelangelo Buonarroti. Their images are among the most widely known works of art in the world. Leonardo's The Last Supper, Raphael's The School of Athens and Michelangelo's Sistine Chapel ceiling are the textbook examples of this period.

High Renaissance painting evolved into Mannerism (c. 1520–1580), especially in Florence. Mannerist artists, who consciously rebelled against the principles of High Renaissance, tend to represent elongated figures in illogical spaces. Contemporaries criticized this period as seeming artificial. Modern scholarship has recognized the capacity of Mannerist art to convey strong (often religious) emotion where the High Renaissance failed to do so. Some of the main artists of this period are Pontormo, Rosso Fiorentino, Parmigianino and Giulio Romano.

After 1580, the Carracci brothers, Annibale and Agostino, began to develop the Baroque style of painting focused on greater drama, rich colors and the use of extreme light and darkness. After 1590, Caravaggio developed a realistic approach to the human figure, painted directly from life and dramatically spotlit against a dark background having an even larger impact on painting moving the Baroque style to the forefront after 1600.

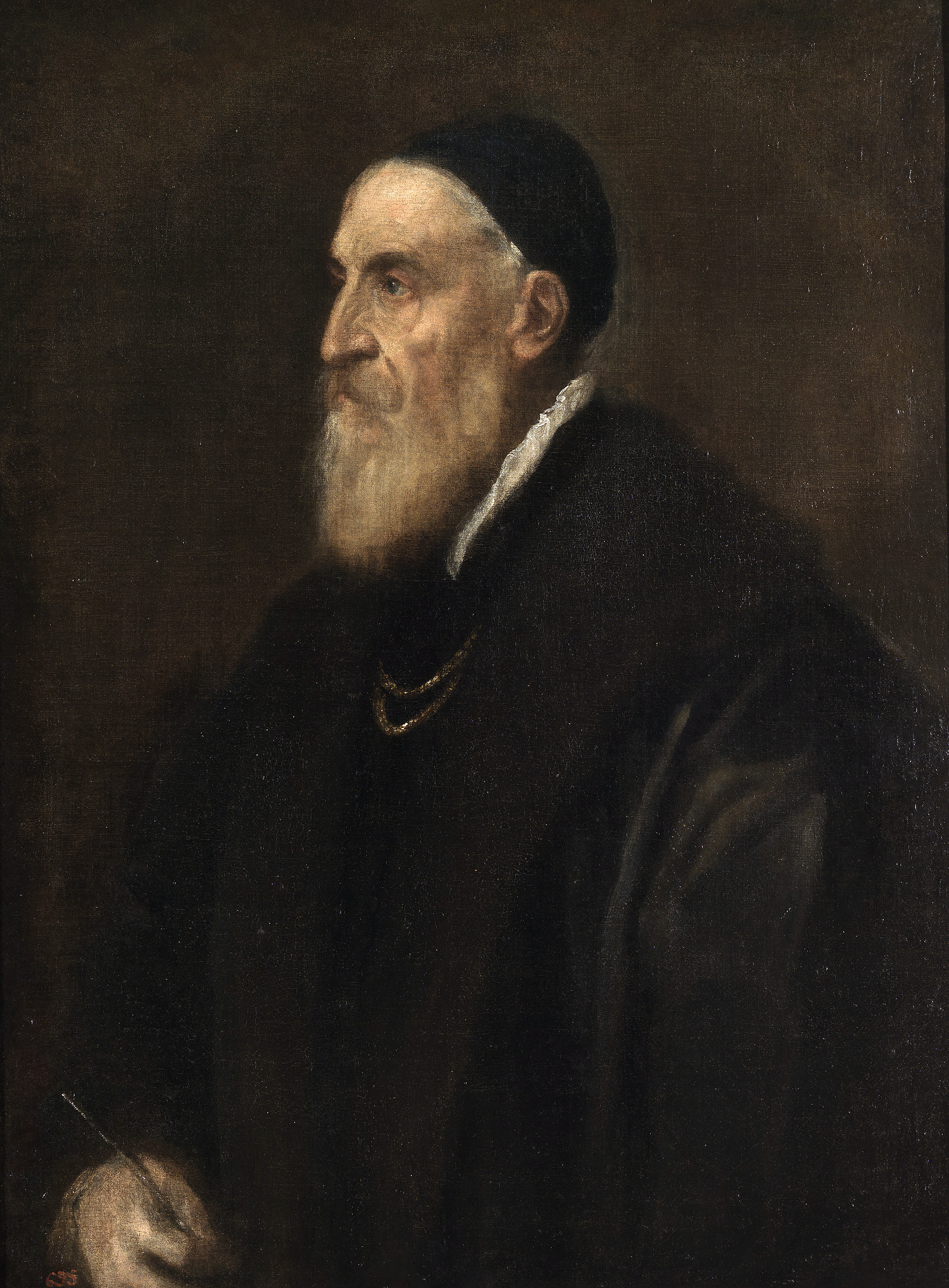
Tiziano

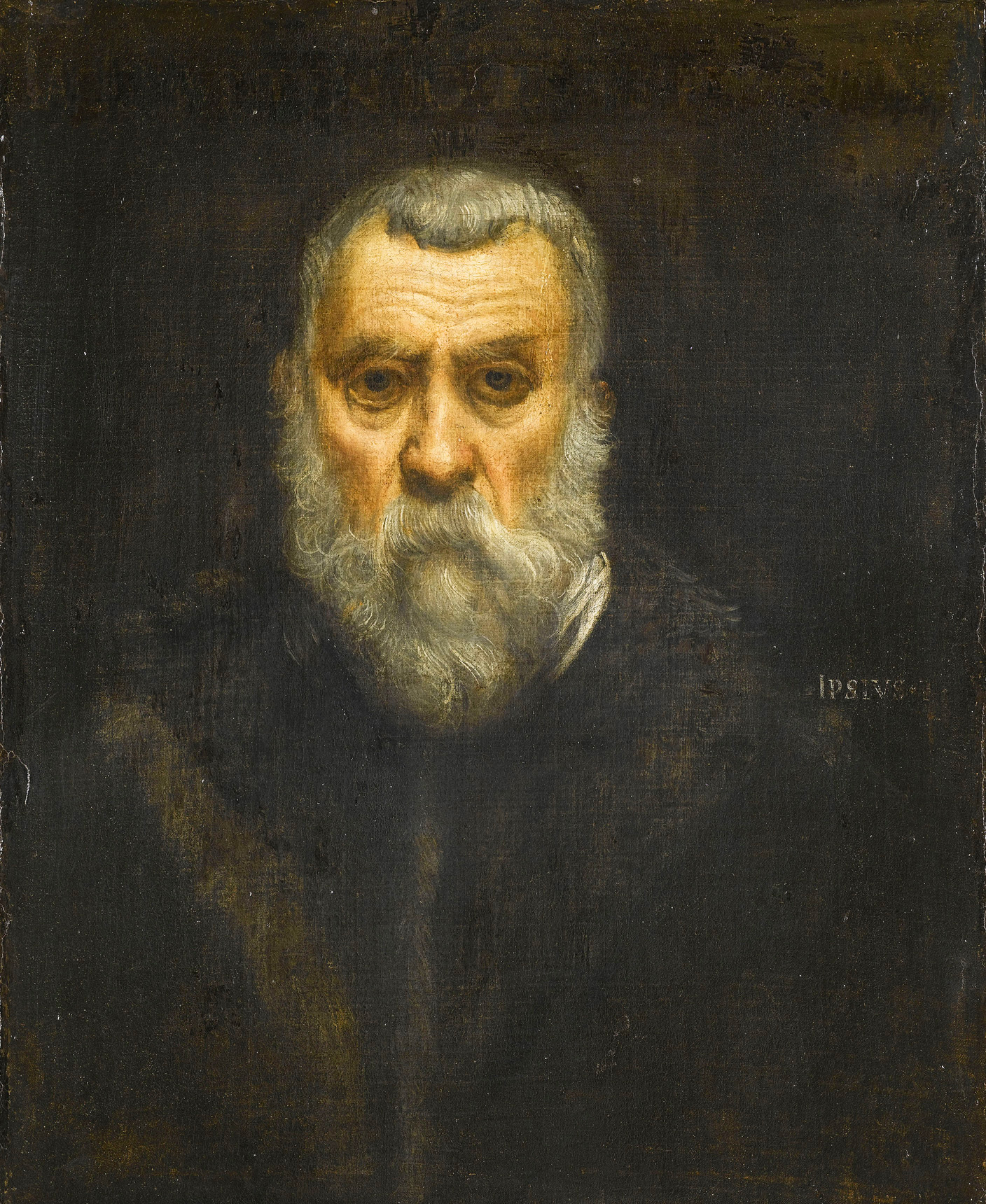
Tintoretto

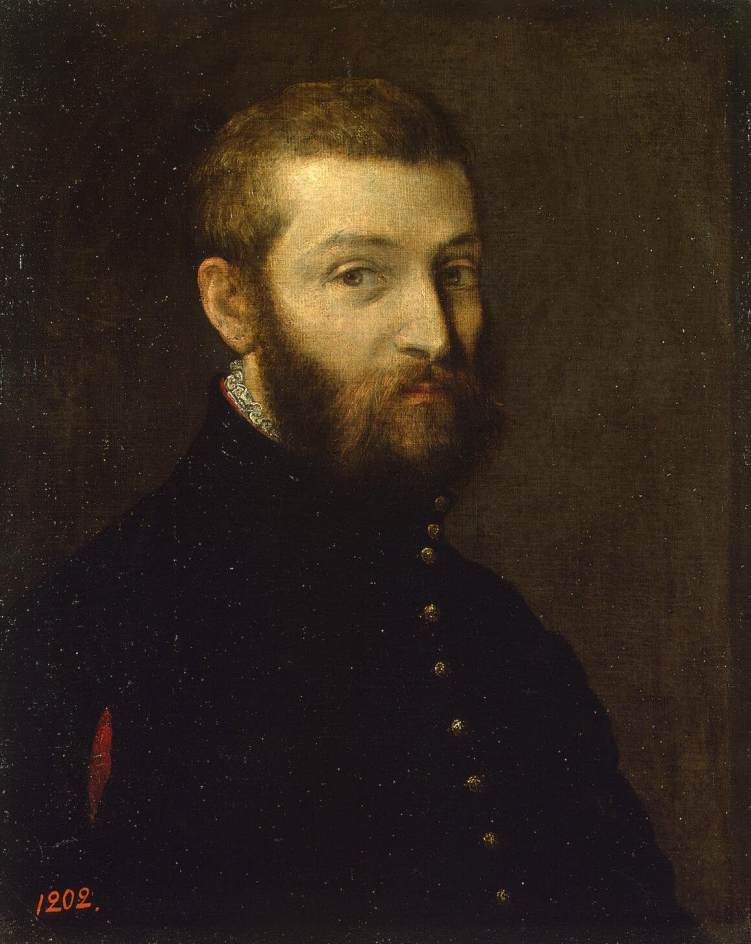
Paolo Veronese

The "great trio that dominated Venetian painting of the cinquecento"

== Music ==
The music of Giovanni Pierluigi da Palestrina is probably the most archetypical Cinquecento music. He simplified some of the complexities of the music of the time, and advocated a more homophonic style. He was partially reacting to the strictures of the Council of Trent, which discouraged excessively complex polyphony as inhibiting understanding the text. He was the foremost member of the Roman School, a group of composers of predominantly church music, in Rome, spanning the late Renaissance into early Baroque eras. Many of the composers had a direct connection to the Vatican and the papal chapel, though they worked at several churches, stylistically they are often contrasted with the Venetian School of composers, a concurrent movement which was much more progressive.

In Venice, from about 1534 until around 1600, an impressive polychoral style developed, which gave Europe some of the grandest, most sonorous music composed up until that time, with multiple choirs of singers, brass and strings in different spatial locations in the Basilica San Marco di Venezia (see Venetian School). These multiple revolutions spread over Europe in the next several decades, beginning in Germany and then moving to Spain, France and England somewhat later, demarcating the beginning of what we now know as the Baroque musical era.

In the late 16th century, as the Renaissance era closes, an extremely manneristic style develops. In secular music, especially in the madrigal, there was a trend towards complexity and even extreme chromaticism (as exemplified in madrigals of Luzzaschi, Marenzio, and Gesualdo). The term mannerism derives from art history.

== Literature ==
The most famous works of the Italian Renaissance by Boccaccio, and Petrarch were written in the 14th century, but continued to exert influence. Ludovico Ariosto (Orlando furioso), Baldassare Castiglione (The Book of the Courtier) and Niccolò Machiavelli (The Prince) were eminent writers of the Cinquecento.

== Architecture ==
It was the result of the revival of classic architecture known as Renaissance, but the change had commenced already a century earlier, in the works of Ghiberti and Donatello in sculpture, and of Brunelleschi and Alberti in architecture.

== See also ==
- Duecento – the 13th century in Italian culture
- Trecento – the 14th century in Italian culture
- Quattrocento – the 15th century in Italian culture
- Seicento – the 17th century in Italian culture
- Settecento – the 18th century in Italian culture
- Ottocento – the 19th century in Italian culture
- Novecento – the 20th century in Italian culture
