= Quattrocento =

Italian art and culture of 1400–1499

The cultural and artistic events of Italy during the period 1400 to 1499 are collectively referred to as the Quattrocento (UK: /ˌkwætroʊˈtʃɛntoʊ, -trə-/ KWAT-roh-CHEN-toh, -trə-, US: /ˌkwɒtroʊ-/ KWOT-roh-; Italian: [ˌkwattroˈtʃɛnto]), from the Italian word for the number '400', in turn from millequattrocento, '1400'. The Quattrocento encompasses the artistic styles of the late Middle Ages (most notably International Gothic), the early Renaissance (beginning around 1425), and the start of the High Renaissance, generally asserted to begin between 1495 and 1500.

== Historical context ==
In the late Middle Ages, the political structure of the European continent slowly coalesced from small, turbulent fiefdoms into larger, more stable nation states ruled by monarchies. In Italy, urban centers arose, populated by merchant and trade classes able to defend themselves. Money replaced land as the primary measure of wealth, and increasing numbers of serfs became freedmen. The changes in Medieval Italy and the decline of feudalism paved the way for social, cultural, and economic changes.

The Quattrocento is viewed as the transition from the Medieval period to the age of the Italian Renaissance, principally in the cities of Rome, Florence, Milan, Venice, Naples. The period saw the fall of Constantinople to the Ottoman Empire, and it has been compared with the Timurid Renaissance which unfolded at the same time in Central Asia.

== Development of Quattrocento styles ==
Quattrocento art shed the decorative mosaics typically associated with Byzantine art along with Christian and Gothic media, as well as styles in stained glass, frescoes, illuminated manuscripts and sculpture. Instead, Quattrocento artists incorporated the more classic forms developed by classical Roman and Greek art.

== List of Italian Quattrocento artists ==
Since the Quattrocento overlaps with part of the Renaissance, it would be inaccurate to say that a particular artist was Quattrocento or Renaissance. Artists of the time probably would not have identified themselves as members of a school or period.

- Andrea del Castagno
- Andrea del Verrocchio
- Andrea della Robbia
- Andrea Mantegna
- Antonello da Messina
- Antoniazzo Romano
- Antonio del Pollaiuolo
- Antonio Rossellino
- Benozzo Gozzoli
- Bertoldo di Giovanni
- Carlo Crivelli
- Cosimo Tura
- Desiderio da Settignano
- Domenico di Bartolo
- Domenico Ghirlandaio
- Domenico Veneziano
- Donatello
- Ercole de' Roberti
- Filippo Brunelleschi
- Filippo Lippi
- Fra Angelico
- Fra Carnevale
- Francesco del Cossa
- Francesco di Giorgio
- Francesco Squarcione
- Gentile Bellini
- Gentile da Fabriano
- Giovanni Bellini
- Giovanni di Paolo
- Jacopo de' Barbari
- Jacopo Bellini
- Justus of Ghent
- Leonardo da Vinci
- Lorenzo Ghiberti
- Luca della Robbia
- Luca Signorelli
- Luciano Laurana
- Masaccio
- Masolino
- Melozzo da Forlì
- Michelangelo
- Nanni di Banco
- Paolo Uccello
- Pedro Berruguete
- Piero della Francesca
- Pietro Perugino
- Pisanello
- Sandro Botticelli
- Il Sassetta
- Troso da Monza
- Vecchietta
- Vittore Carpaccio
- Vittore Crivelli

Also see the list of 27 prominent 15th century painters made contemporaneously by Giovanni Santi, Raphael Sanzio's father as part of a poem for the Duke of Urbino.

== See also ==
- Duecento – the 13th century in Italian culture
- Trecento – the 14th century in Italian culture
- Cinquecento – the 16th century in Italian culture
- Seicento – the 17th century in Italian culture
- Settecento – the 18th century in Italian culture
- Ottocento – the 19th century in Italian culture
- Novecento – the 20th century in Italian culture
