= Zavattari =

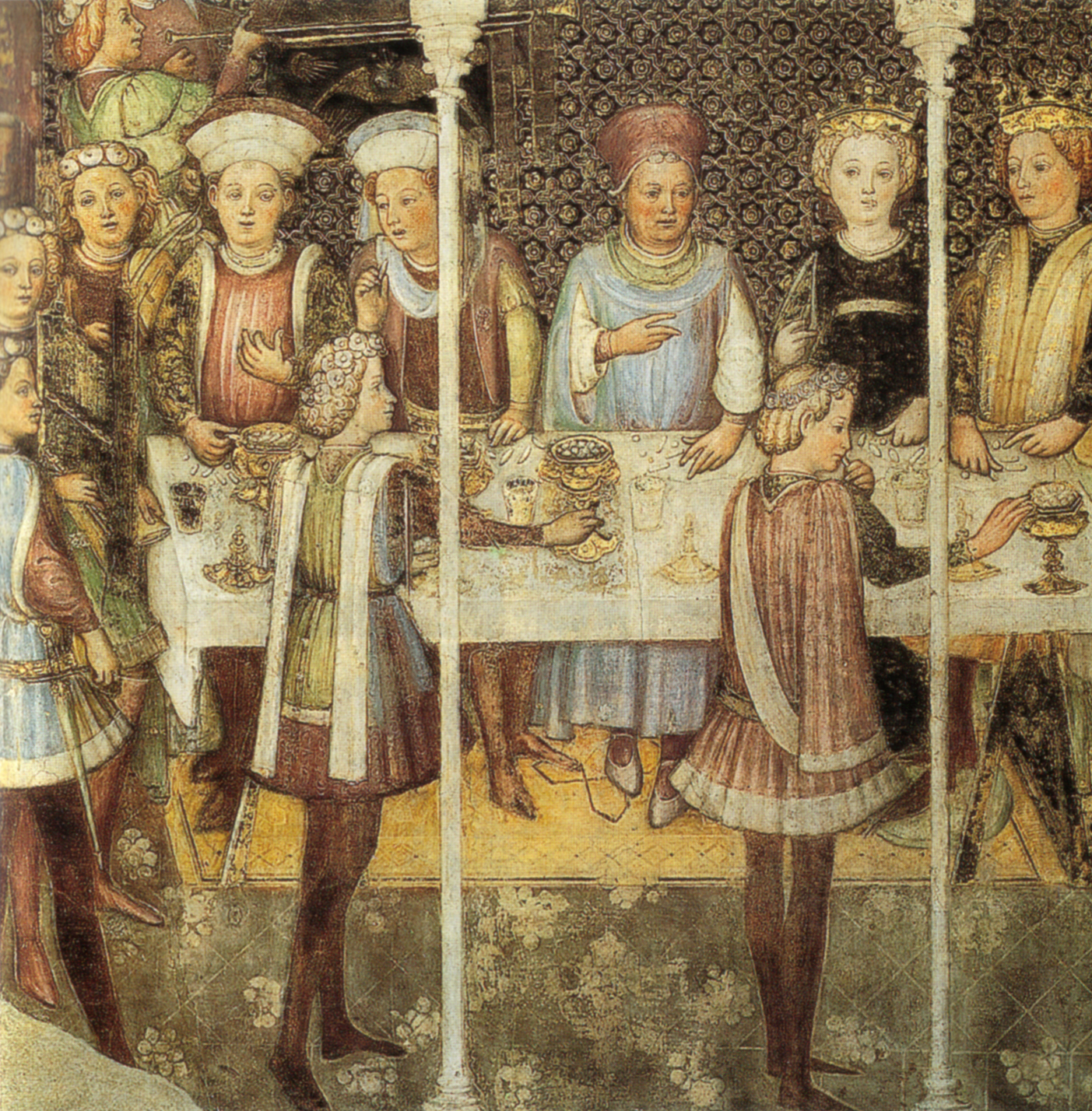
Detail of the frescoes in the Theodelinda Chapel in the Cathedral of Monza

The Zavattari were a family of Italian painters active in Lombardy from the 14th to the 16th century.

Cristoforo and Franceschino Zavattari are known as collaborators to the decoration of the Duomo of Milan in the early 15th century. The family's masterwork are the frescoes in the Theodelinda Chapel in the Cathedral of Monza, work by Ambrogio and Gregorio Zavattari (1444). Unusually in fresco, the gold sky is patterned in relief pastiglia plasterwork. Some attribute this work to Troso da Monza. Subsequently, Franceschino and his sons worked at the Certosa di Pavia, where they conserve a fresco depicting the Madonna, and the church of San Lanfranco in Pavia.

To the Zavattari are attributed some of the cards in the Visconti-Sforza tarot deck, usually referred to as Bonifacio Bembo.
