= Military Arsenal of Turin =

Building in Turin, Italy

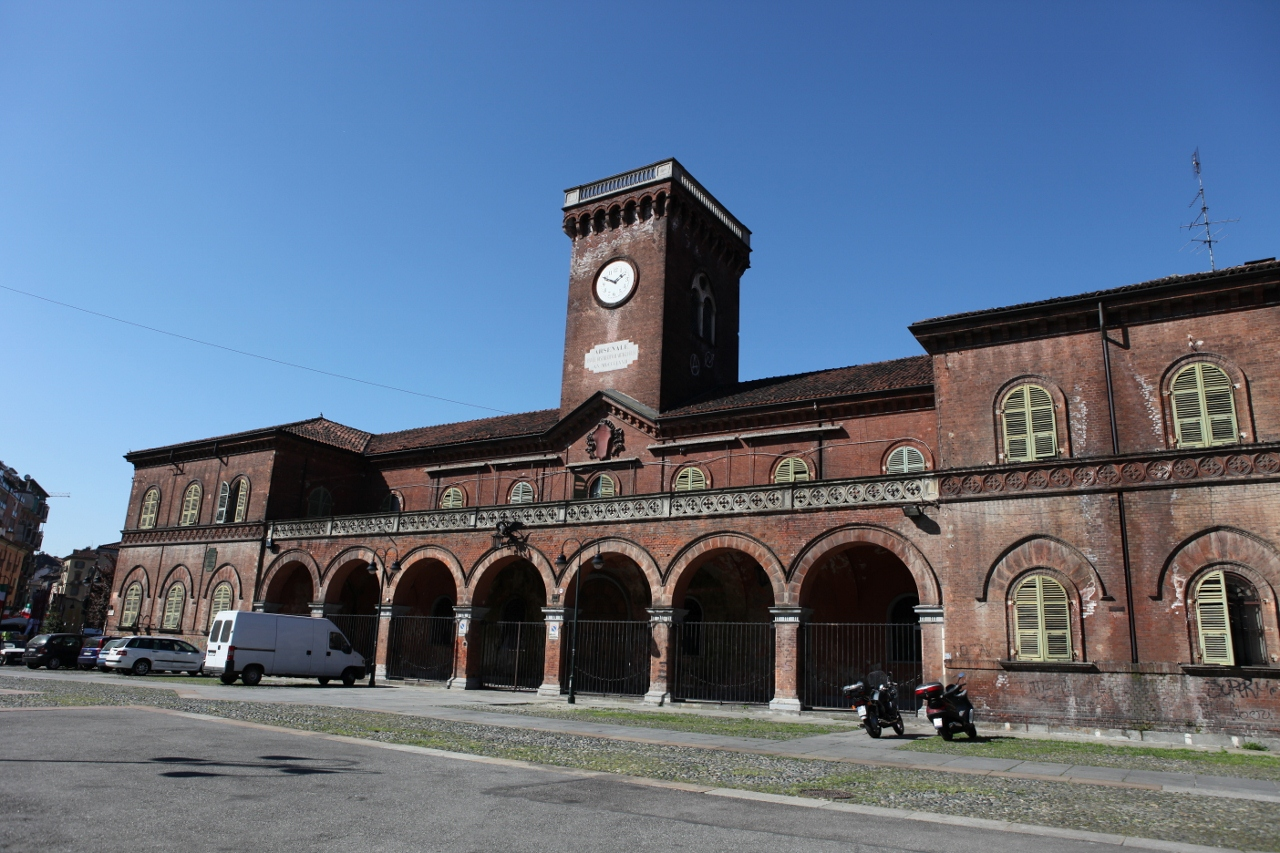
The Arsenal's Caserma Cavalli.

The Military Arsenal (Arsenale militare) is a building in the Borgo Dora of the Italian city of Turin. As its name suggests, it formerly housed the city's military arsenal from the sixteenth to the twentieth centuries.

In the mid-nineteenth century it was rebuilt after a devastating fire, with workshops, magazines for military materiel, one barracks and a porticoed 'Caserna Cavalli' (literally 'cavalry barracks') all added. These nineteenth-century buildings were badly damaged by the air raids of 8 December 1942 and 13 July 1943 during the Second World War, with these and the subsequent demolition leaving only two nineteenth-century survivors, the Caserna Cavalli (now housing the Scuola Holden) and part of the former arsenal (housing the Servizio missionario giovani or SERMIG).

== History ==
=== Magazine ===
The area was first used for military purposes in 1582 when Antonio Ponte converted an existing building there into a powder magazine. Between 1775 and 1778 the Savoy government rebuilt that magazine to a design by Antonio Quaglia.

The magazine was gradually expanded until on 26 April 1852 a fire spontaneously broke out within it. Sergeant Paolo Sacchi was stationed there and his heroic intervention prevented more serious damage, but around 25,000 kilos of gunpowder still exploded and almost immediately destroyed most of the machinery and buildings, killed twenty people and left nineteen injured, of whom three later died in hospital.

=== Arsenal ===
When Italy unified its military engineers began rebuilding the complex and its adjoining barracks in 1862to plans by Giovanni Castellazzi. The Arsenal was moved there from its old site in the Palazzo dell'Arsenale at 22 via dell'Arsenale and the Borgo Dora site renamed the 'Arsenal for Artillery-making'.

The new buildings included storage warehouses, barracks, workshops and a monumental entrance known as the Caserma Cavalli. The total size of the complex was 60 square kilometres and it reached its maximum productivity during the First World War.

=== Damage and reconstruction ===
Incendiary and explosive bombs dropped during the Second World War air raids destroyed the sheds and workshops, cracking vaults and collapsing walls. In total forty-five buildings were destroyed and sixty more damaged. The Arsenal did resume production after the war but this ended in the 1970s and the surviving part of the Arsenal building was abandoned until 1983, when SERMIG began to rebuild it to house its headquarters, converting several spaces and renaming it the 'Arsenal of Peace'. The Caserma Cavalli was abandoned until the city council began rebuilding works in 2012, the same year as it transferred it to the Scuola Holden, its present occupier.

== Bibliography (in Italian) ==
- "museo Torino (ex Caserma Cavalli)".
- "museo Torino (Arsenale della Pace)".
- "i canali di Torino".
- "Architelling".
- "bando comune Torino" (PDF).
- "comune di Torino".
