= Silk (novel) =

1996 novel by Alessandro Baricco

- First edition (Italian)
- Author: Alessandro Baricco
- Original title: Seta
- Translator: Guido Waldman
- Language: Italian
- Genre: Novel
- Publisher: Rizzoli editore
- Publication date: 1996
- Publication place: Italy
- English publication date: October 1997
- Media type: Print (Hardcover & Paperback)
- Pages: 100 pp (First edition, hardcover)
- ISBN: 88-17-66059-0
- OCLC: 34657857

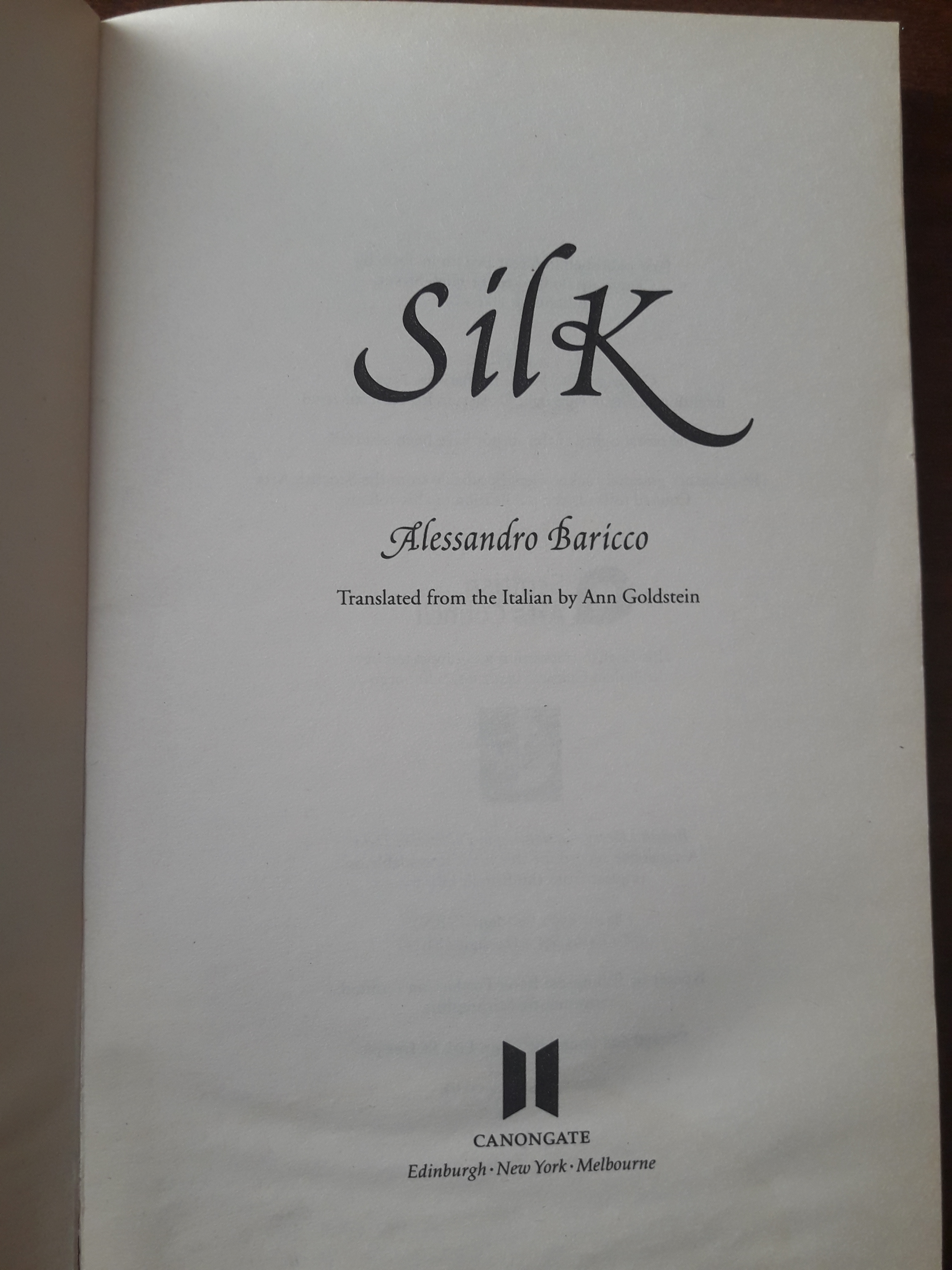
Silk Alessandro Barico Translated by Ann Goldstein

Silk (Italian: Seta) is a 1996 novel by the Italian writer Alessandro Baricco. It was translated into English in 1997 by Guido Waldman. A new English translation by Ann Goldstein was published in 2006.

== Plot ==
The novel tells the story of a French silkworm merchant-turned-smuggler named Hervé Joncour in 19th century France who travels to Japan for his town's supply of silkworms after a disease wipes out their African supply. His first trip to Japan takes place in the Bakumatsu period, when Japan was still largely closed to foreigners. During his stay in Japan, he becomes obsessed with the concubine of a local baron. His trade in Japan and his personal relationship with the concubine are both strained by the internal political turmoil and growing anti-Western sentiment in Japan that followed the arrival of Matthew C. Perry in Edo Bay.

== Adaptations ==
Silk has been adapted for stage and film:

- A theater adaptation was made in 2005 by Mary Zimmerman
- Silk, a 2007 film

== Editions ==
Silk (English edition) by Alessandro Baricco; translated by Guido Waldman.

- Hardcover - ISBN 1-86046-258-8 published in (ISBN 978-1-86046-258-0) October 1997 by The Harvill Press
- Paperback - ISBN 1-86046-366-5 published in May 1998 by The Harvill Press
