= Scuola Holden =

School of creative writing in Torino (Italy)

Coordinates: 45°04′53″N 7°41′02″E

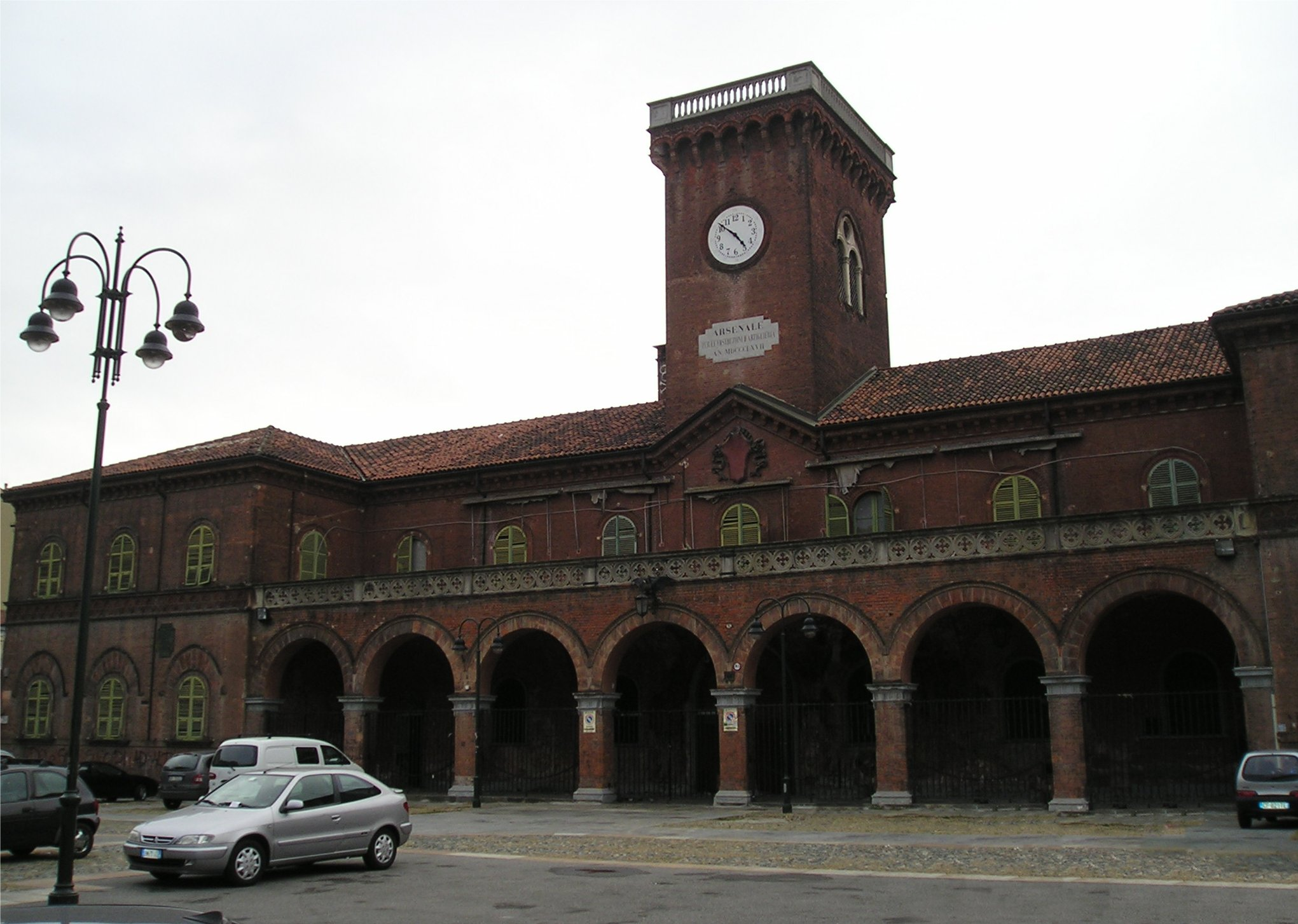
The school's current home in the former arsenal

The Scuola Holden is a storytelling school in Turin, Italy founded in 1994 by noted writer Alessandro Baricco. Initially it was based in an Art Nouveau palazzina on Corso Dante but in 2013 it moved to the former cavalry barracks in Turin's former Military Arsenal in piazza Borgo Dora, reopening on 14 September that year, where it is still based. It is part of the International 826-Inspired Organizations network (which links writing and editing centres for young people).

== History ==
It was founded in 1994 in Turin by Baricco (also its first principal and teacher), Antonella Parigi, Dalia Oggero, Marco San Pietro and Alberto Jona, as Italy's first school for storytellers. It is named after the protagonist in J.D. Salinger's The Catcher in the Rye, a boy who hates school, setting it up as a place where everyone can find their story. Baricco coined the term 'Contemporary Humanities', which is an umbrella term covering many disciplines studying and interpreting society and human culture.

In September 2019 it set up the 'Academy' course - it takes three years and awards a diploma equivalent to the DAMS (discipline delle arti, della musica e dello spettacolo). The school also runs a two-year 'Original' course, with its five colleges of Writing, Cinema, Drama, Story Design and International, which awards the equivalent of a masters degree.

Since February 2024 it has been completely owned by the Feltrinelli Group (also owners of the publisher of the same name); previously the Scuola's founder Alessandro Baricco owned 25.5 %, Eataly 16 % and Andrea Guerra 7 %.

== External links (in Italian) ==
- "Official site".
- "La stampa".
