= Palazzo dell'Arsenale =

Coordinates: 45.0666°N 7.6778°E

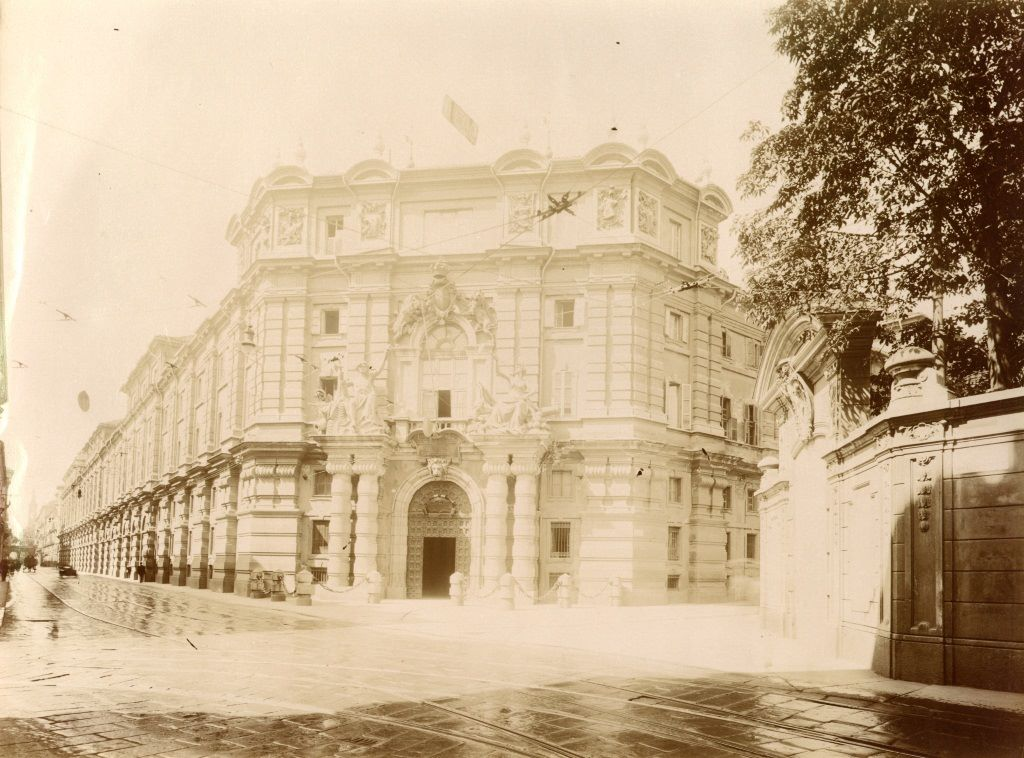
1920s photograph of its monumental entrance.

The Palazzo dell'Arsenale is a military complex at 22 via Arsenale in Turin, Italy. It originally housed both a training school and an arsenal, but the latter function was moved to the Military Arsenal in 1861. It still provides officers' basic training.

It is a square-shaped palazzo-style building, covering an entire block of 190 by 165 metres. It has all the features of an arsenal - grandiose underground rooms linked to the surface by ramps wide enough for bulky artillery trains or trailers, sturdy closely-spaced pillars supporting considerable weight, vast rooms with domed vaults.

== History ==
It was built according to two plans by Filippo Juvara (dated to 1728 and 1730), but construction work only began in 1738, headed by captain Antonio Felice De Vincenti, a military architect. It opened as a military arsenal in 1752 and as a training school, the Regie Scuole Teoriche e Pratiche di Artiglieria e Fortificazione (Royal Theoretical and Practical School of Artillery and Fortification) of the Kingdom of Sardinia. Work on the complex was finally completed in 1783.

It was transferred to the army of unified Italy, which added a precision laboratory for testing new weapons. Sited on a corner, its monumental entrance was rebuilt in 1890. It was renamed the Scuola di Applicazione di Artiglieria e Genio (Artillery and Engineering Training School) in 1928 and badly damaged in the 1942 air raid on Turin.

The Italian Army's training schools for infantry, cavalry, artillery and engineers were merged into a single command in 1976 - this was named the Training School and Institute of Military Studies, based in the same Turin building. It has also housed the staff training course for senior officers since 2003 and the headquarters of the Training and Training Schools Command since 2009. Its large internal courtyard was restored in 2021.
