= San Lanfranco, Pavia =

Church in Pavia, Italy

Coordinates: 45.193707°N 9.128455°E

- Church San Lanfranco
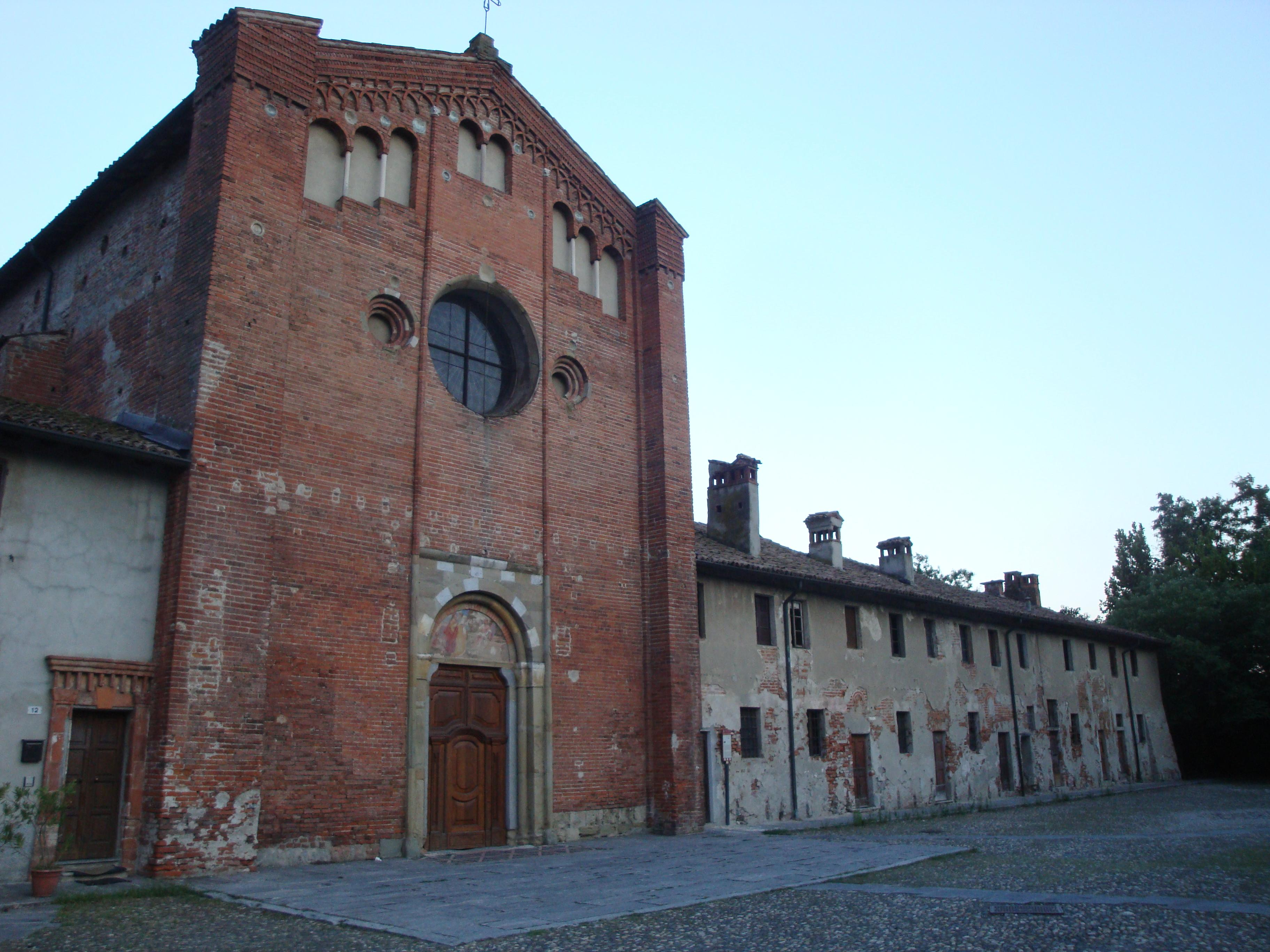
- Façade of the building

- Location within Northern Italy
- Country: Italy
- Denomination: Catholic
- Website: Home

History
- Founded: 1090
- Dedication: Saint Lanfranc
- Consecrated: 1236

Architecture
- Functional status: Active
- Architectural type: Cathedral
- Style: Romanesque

Specifications
- Materials: Brick, sandstone

Administration
- Diocese: Diocese of Pavia

San Lanfranco is a Romanesque-style Catholic church and former abbey, located on via San Lanfranco Vescovo, 4/6, just west of the town center of Pavia, region of Lombardy, Italy.

== History ==
A paleochristian church at the site, dedicated to the Holy Sepulcher (Santo Sepolcro) was located near here, and the first documentation of a monastery here date to 1090. The monastery became associated with the Vallumbrosan Order, and hosted the bishop Lanfranco Beccaria, till his death in 1198. Pope Alexander III elevated Lanfranco to sainthood the next year. This church, which held his relics, was rebuilt starting about this time, and leading to consecration in 1236, with the bell-tower dating to 1237, and the facade to 1257. The small cloister was designed in 1476 by the architect Giovanni Antonio Amadeo. Amadeo also designed and sculpted the elements of the Arca di San Lanfranco which serves as funereal monument and tomb to the saint.

Located outside the walls of Pavia, the abbey was frequently requisitioned by armies besieging the town. Over the years a number of events, including floods and fires, damaged the church and abbey. During the Siege of Pavia in 1524, which ended in the Battle of 1525, the King of France Francis I established his headquarters in the monastery. Soon after 1782, the monastery was suppressed and the church was transformed into a parish.

== Architecture ==
The facade is tripartite and narrow on the sides by two voluminous buttresses. In the middle there are circular openings, in the center the portal riquadrato stone. The front is surmounted by a blind loggia, typical of Romanesque Pavia. The upper part is decorated with ceramic plates (examples of Pavese archaic majolica). The bell tower dates back to 1237 the structure is slender. On each side there are five mirrors with a row of six simple arches. On the top the bell cell framed by a three-hour window. Under the band of arches the white plaster contrasts with the red of the terracotta. There are also majolica plates, also present on the facade, as evidence of relations with the Near East. The interior of the church is a Latin cross. The nave is punctuated by thin pillars and covered by cross vaults. The dome is octagonal. The presbytery, with a small polygonal apse, dates back to the interventions of the late 15th century. In the right transept, inside a rich baroque frame in stucco, there is a fresco dating back to the mid-fifteenth century with the Madonna and Child, God, a holy abbot with the monk and a patron saint monk recently attributed to Franceschino Zavattari.

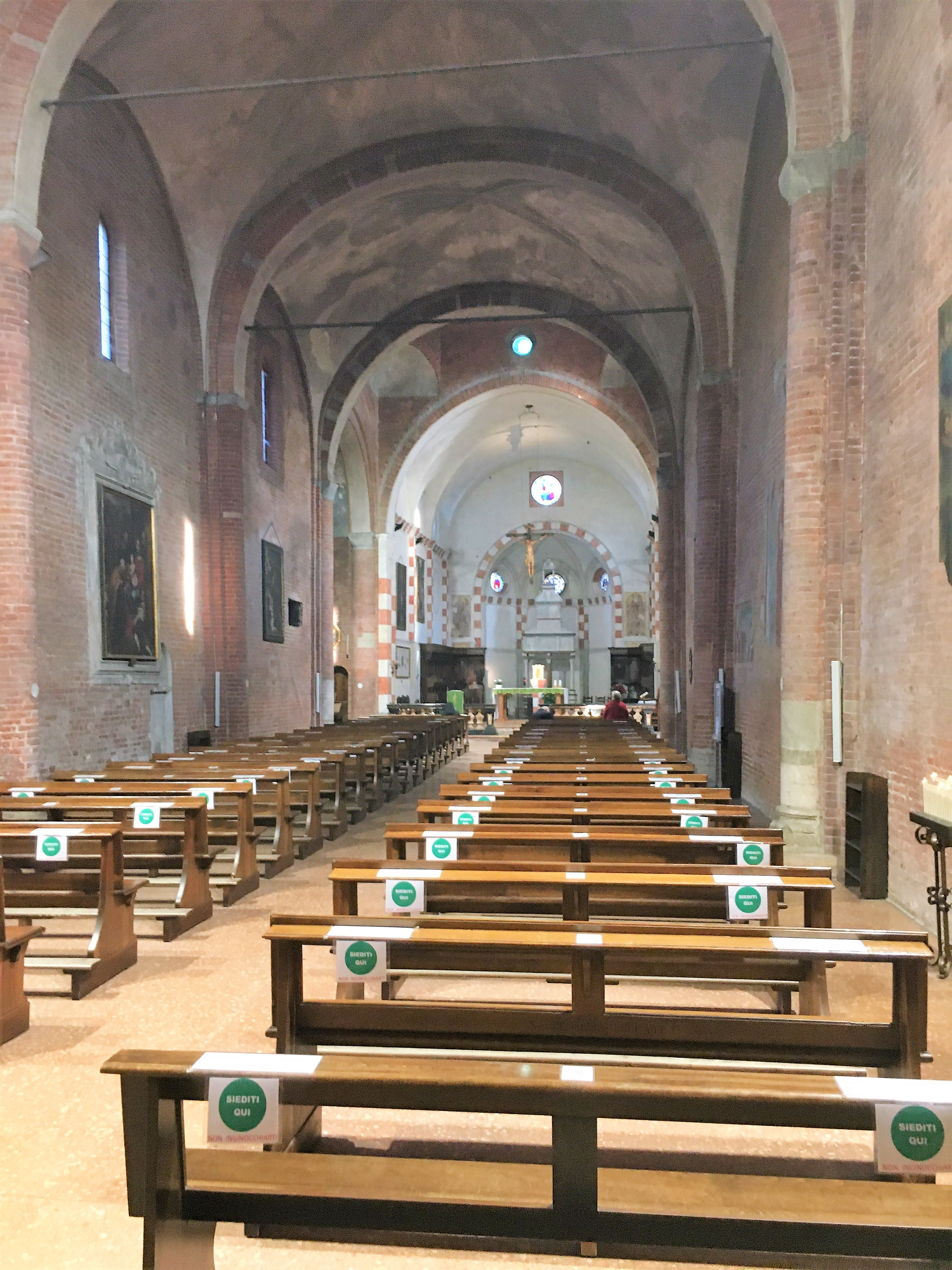
Interior.

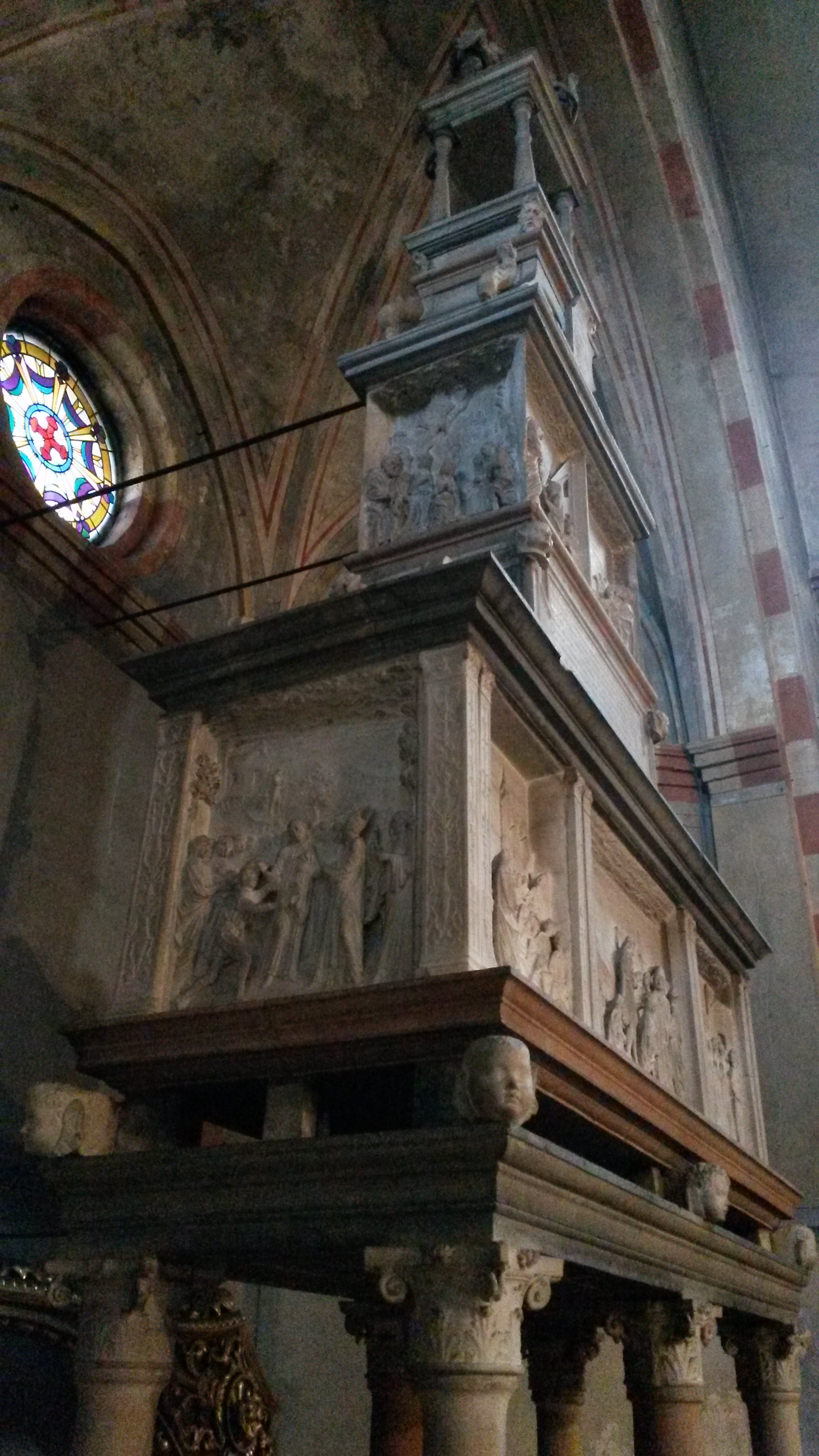
Giovanni Antonio Amadeo, Ark of San Lanfranco (1489).

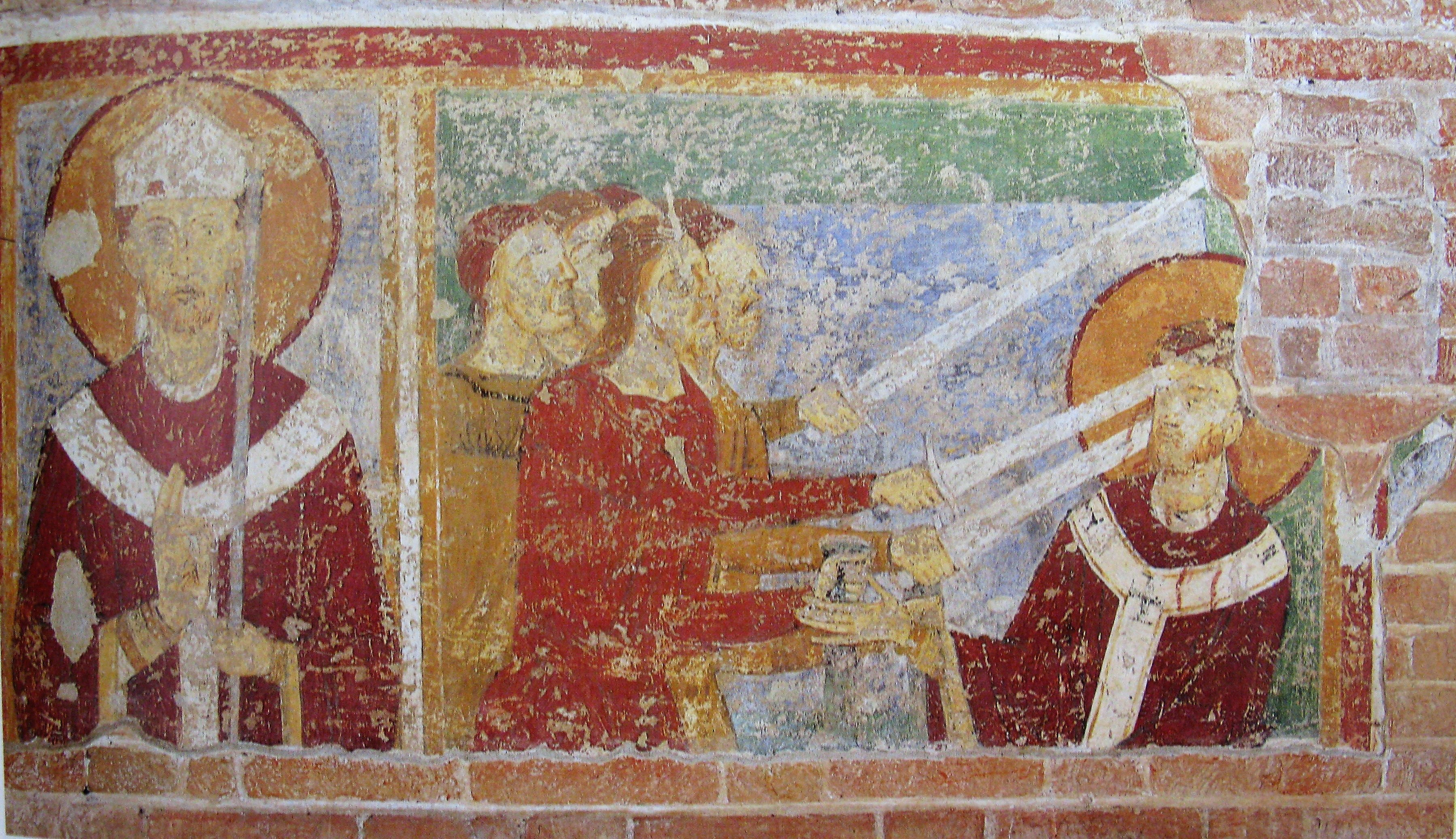
Assassination of Thomas Becket. Fresco, first half of the 13th century.

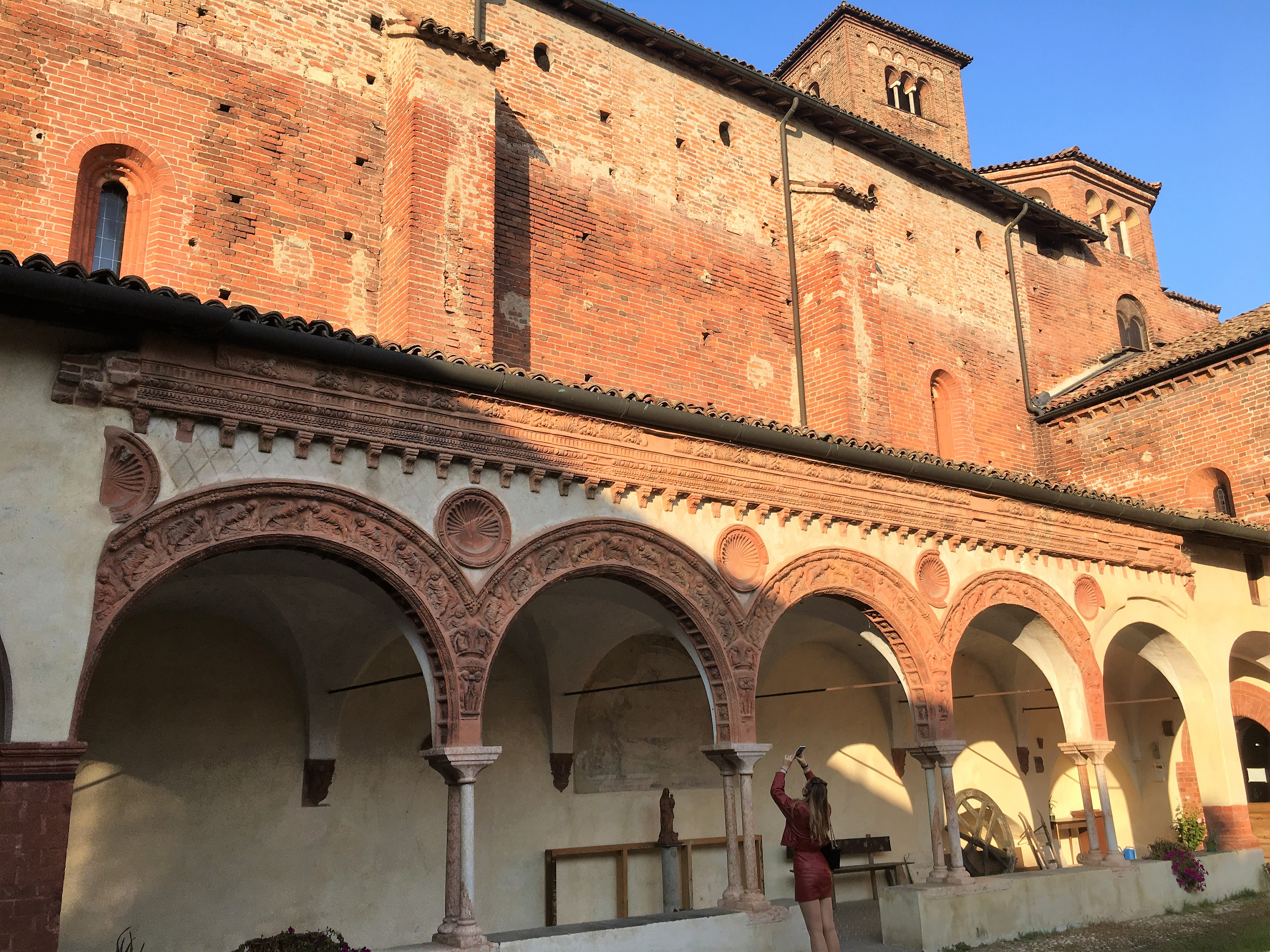
Small cloister (1467).

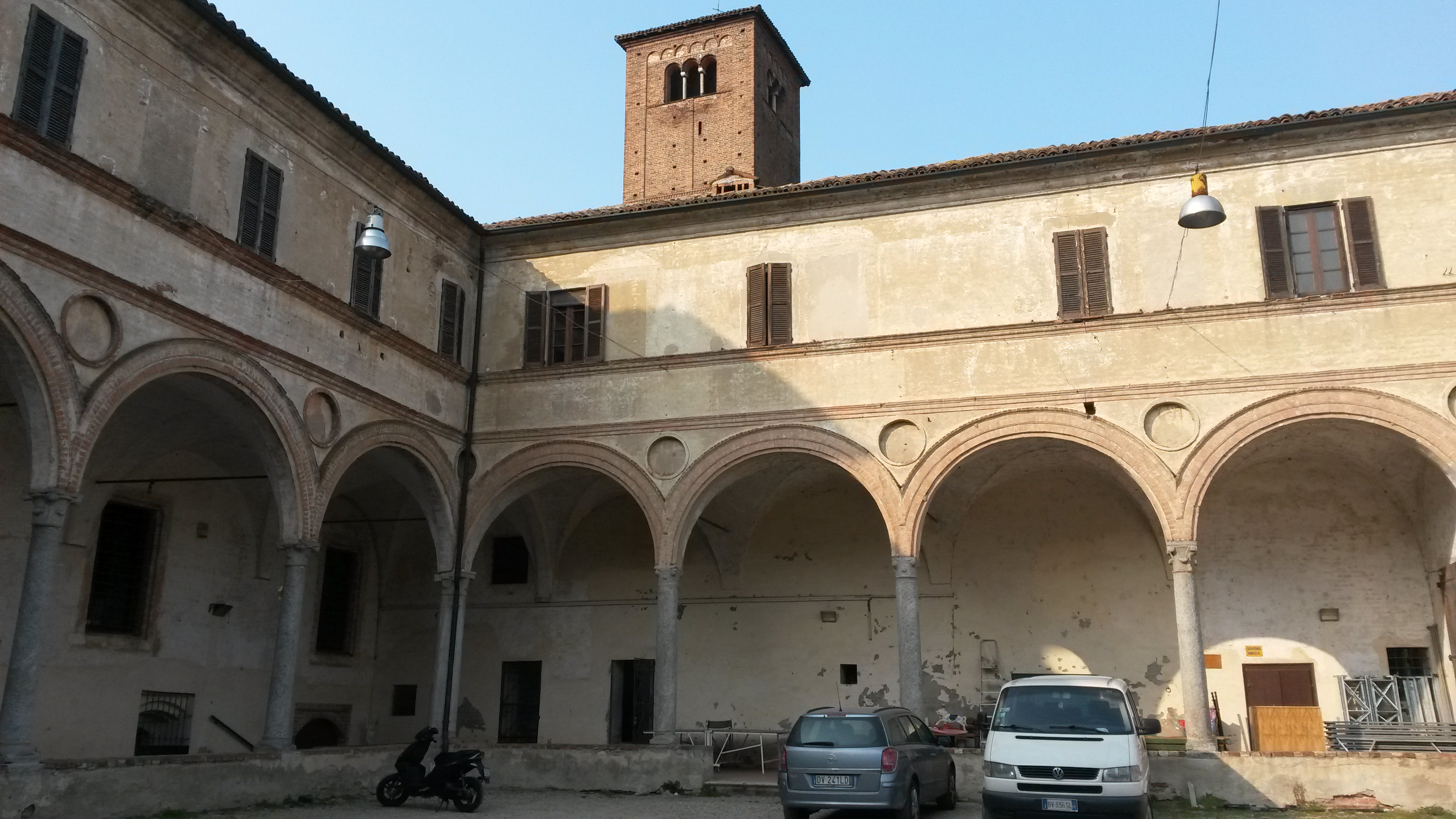
Great cloister (circa 1480).

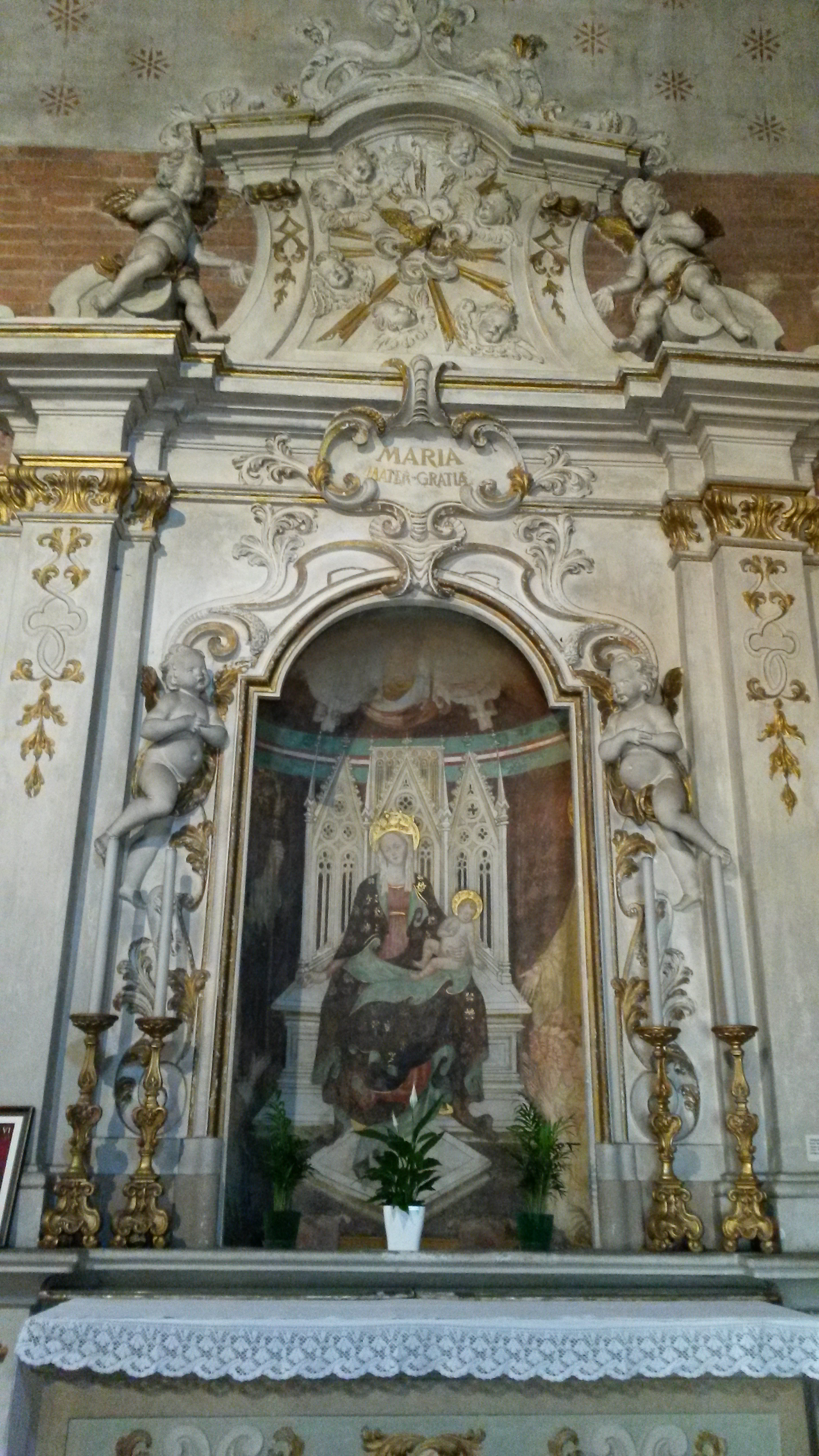
Franceschino Zavattari, Madonna Enthroned.

The wooden choir in carved walnut, made between the second half of the fifteenth century and the very first years of the next, bears the coat of arms and the name "Luca" (name of the abbot Luca Zanachi). The choir, located along the side walls of the presbytery, consists of two bodies of nine stalls each, separated by perforated barriers, with cockpit seats and smooth back panels on the top framed by a lobed motif.

While the exterior of the church is mainly plain brick, the interior still contains frescoes from the 13th to 15th centuries. Among the most notable, is a fresco depicting the murder of St Thomas Becket, whose life had parallels with San Lanfranco. The remains of the small cloister include Romanesque carvings on the columns. The larger cloister has 15th century Renaissance style decorations in the capitals. The tomb of the Saint (Arca de San Lanfranco) was completed from 1498-1508 with designs by Amedeo, and is notable for the carved bas-reliefs by Amedeo and his followers depicting the life of the Saint.

== Biography ==
- Giovanna Forzatti Golia, Istituzioni ecclesiastiche pavesi dall'età longobarda alla dominazione visconteo- sforzesca, Roma, Herder, 2002.
- L. Giordano, M. Visioli, R. Gorini, L. Baini, P. L. Mulas, C. Fraccaro, L'architettura del Quattrocento e del Cinquecento, in Storia di Pavia, III/3, L’arte dall'XI al XVI secolo, Milano, Banca Regionale Europea, 1996.
