= Troso da Monza =

Italian painter

Troso da Monza, also called Troso di Giovanni Jacobi, was an Italian painter of the Quattrocento, active around 1444 in Monza and Bergamo.

Some frescoes originally in the church of Santa Marie delle Grazie in Bergamo have been attributed to Troso, where he appears to have collaborated with Giacomo Georgi de' Scannardi. Giovanni Paolo Lomazzo, in his Treatise on Painting, Sculpture and Architecture, has a chapter on the composition of grotesques, stating Troso da Monza has drawn a book full of so many different and powerful grotesque figures that I believe that there are no longer any more left to invent. In that book is actually recorded anything is possible in this kind of specialty. The frescoes depicting the History of Queen Thedolinda for a chapel in the Cathedral of Monza have been attributed by some to Troso, others have ascribed the frescoes to the brothers Zavattari.
