= Novecento =

Novecento may refer to:

- Novecento (group), an Italian music group
- Novecento Italiano, a style begun in Italy in the 1920s
- Nik Novecento (1964–1987), Italian actor and television personality
- 1900 (film), a 1976 Italian epic film directed by Bernardo Bertolucci
- Novecento, a soundtrack album to the film by Ennio Morricone
- Novecento, a taxidermied horse sculpture by Maurizio Cattelan
- Novecento (monologue), a theater monologue by Alessandro Baricco

== See also ==
- Museo del Novecento, or Museum of the Twentieth Century, a museum in Milan, Italy
- The Legend of 1900, a 1998 Italian drama film, after the monologue by Baricco
