= Alessandro Baricco =

Italian writer, director and performer

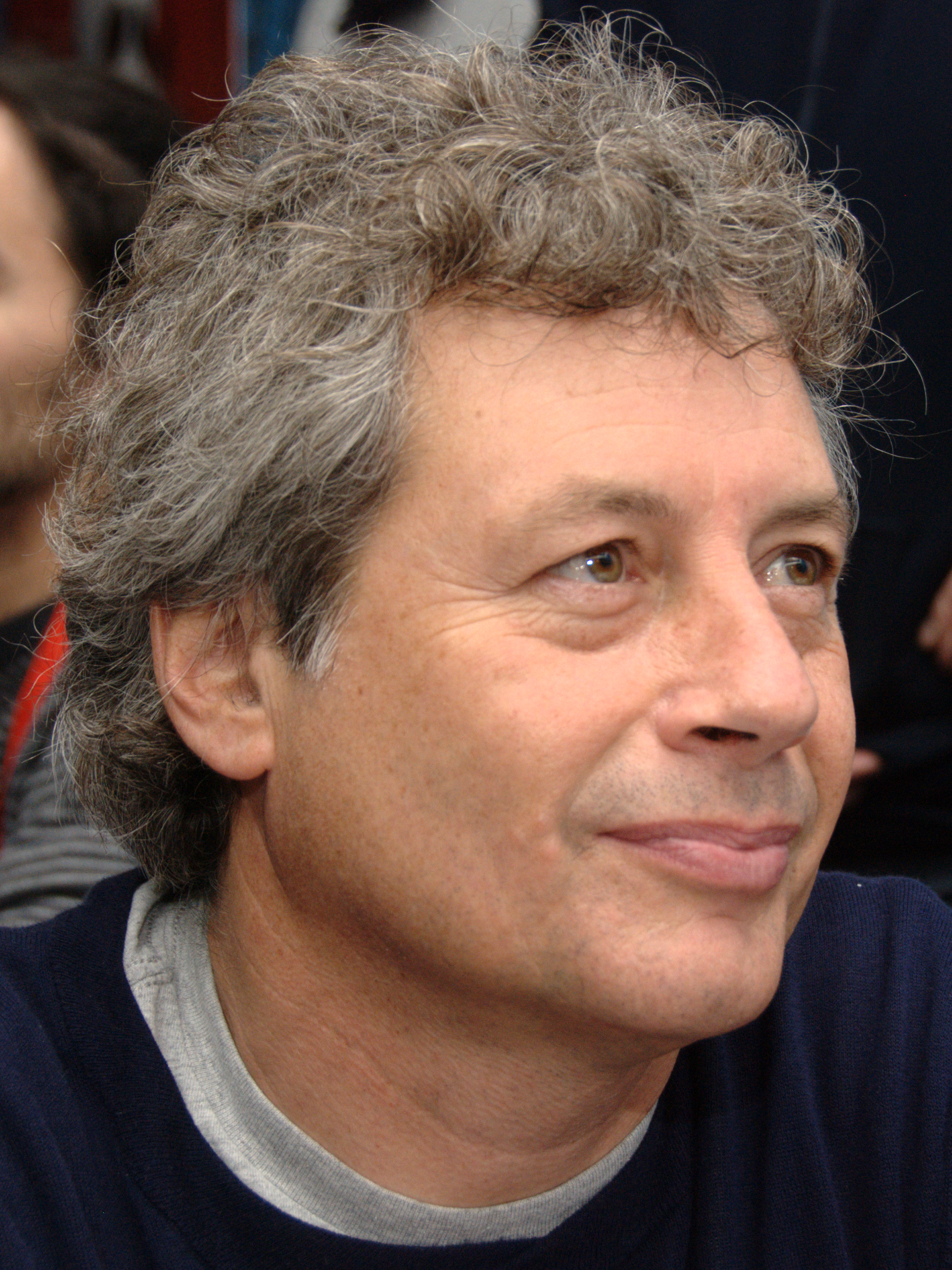
Baricco at Lucca Comics & Games in 2010

Alessandro Baricco (Italian pronunciation: [ale's:andro baˈrik:o]; born 25 January 1958) is an Italian writer, director, and performer. His novels have been translated into a number of languages.

== Early life, family and education ==
Baricco was born in Turin, Italy.

He has earned degrees in philosophy (under Gianni Vattimo) and in piano.

== Career ==
Baricco published essays on music criticism: Il genio in fuga (1988) on Gioachino Rossini, and L'anima di Hegel e le mucche del Wisconsin ("Hegel's Soul and the Cows of Wisconsin", 1992) on the relation between music and modernity. He subsequently worked as music critic for La Repubblica and La Stampa, and hosted talk shows on Rai Tre.

Baricco debuted as a novelist with Castelli di rabbia (translated as Lands of Glass) in 1991.

In 1993, he co-founded a creative writing school in Turin, naming it Scuola Holden after J. D. Salinger's Holden Caulfield. The Scuola Holden hosts a variety of courses on narrative techniques including screenwriting, journalism, novels, and short stories.

In the following years, his fame grew throughout Europe, with his works topping the Italian and French best-seller lists. Larger recognition followed the adaptation of his theatrical monologue Novecento into the film The Legend of 1900, directed by Giuseppe Tornatore.

He has also worked with the French band Air, releasing "City Reading", a mix of the band's music with Baricco's reading of his novel City.

Baricco directed the critically acclaimed film Lezione 21 on Beethoven's Ninth Symphony.

== Personal life ==
Baricco resides in his hometown, Turin. He has two sons. He and his girlfriend Gloria Campaner live together.

In January 2022, Baricco announced he had been diagnosed with chronic myelomonocytic leukemia.

== Bibliography ==
=== Novels ===
- Castelli di rabbia, Rizzoli 1991, Tascabili Bompiani 1994; Lands of Glass, Penguin 1992. Awarded with Prix Médicis étranger – France
- Oceano Mare, Rizzoli 1993; Ocean Sea, ISBN 0-375-70395-0, 1993. Awarded with 'Palazzo al Bosco' — Italy
- Novecento. Un monologo, Giangiacomo Feltrinelli Editore, Milan, 1994; Novecento, 1994.
- Seta, Rizzoli 1996; Silk, ISBN 978-0-307-27797-8, 1996 (See Silk for the film adaptation.)
- City (original title), ISBN 978-0-375-72548-7 (edition in English), Rizzoli 1999
- Constellations (original title), 1999
- Senza sangue, Rizzoli 2002; Without Blood ISBN 1-4000-3478-7, 2002 (Also published in revised form in The New Yorker)
- Questa storia, Fandango 2005
- Emmaus, Feltrinelli 2009
- Mr Gwyn, Feltrinelli 2011
- Tre volte all'alba, Feltrinelli 2012
- Smith & Wesson, Feltrinelli 2014
- La Sposa giovane, Feltrinelli 2015; The Young Bride ISBN 9781609453343, Europa Editions 2016
- Abel, Feltrinelli 2023

=== Theatre ===
- Totem, a literary and musical happening staged in various locations throughout Italy with varying structure and contents. Mostly it consisted of a two-night theatrical event in which Baricco himself, helped by director Gabriele Vacis, actor Eugenio Allegri and musician Daniele Sepe, would read and comment on bits of literature from all centuries and countries, accompanying them with music. In 2001 Rizzoli published the video of Totem recorded in Milan in 1997.
- Novecento, Feltrinelli 1994; The Legend of 1900 (1994) – originally a monologue for theatre staged by director Gabriele Vacis, adapted in 1998 into a film by Giuseppe Tornatore, La leggenda del pianista sull'oceano, with music composed by Ennio Morricone.
- Davila Roa, staged only once by director Luca Ronconi. Reportedly a huge fiasco, it was never published in written form.
- Omero, Iliade, Feltrinelli 2004; An Iliad, Vintage International 2004 ( ISBN 978-0-307-27539-4 ) – a rewriting of Homer's Iliad consisting of 24 chapters, each telling a part of the story through the eyes and words of a prominent character in the poem. The theatrical event from which the book originated was staged only twice due to its logistic difficulties: it spanned over three nights during which the best contemporary Italian actors would impersonate one character each, eight per night.
- Palamedes - the cancelled hero, 2016; a theatrical event about Palamedes translated from ancient Greek by Andrea Marcolongo and staged by Baricco himself and the Italian actress Valeria Solarino.

=== Cinema ===
- Partita Spagnola, Audino Editore 2003 (screenplay never shot).
- Lecture 21, 2008 (written and directed).

=== Collected short writings ===
- Barnum. Cronache dal Grande Show, Feltrinelli 1995
- Barnum 2. Altre cronache del Grande Show, Feltrinelli 1998
- Next. Piccolo libro sulla globalizzazione e il mondo che verrà, Feltrinelli 2002
- Il nuovo Barnum, Feltrinelli 2016

=== Essays ===
- Il genio in fuga. Sul teatro musicale di Rossini, Il Melangolo 1988, Einaudi 1997
- L'anima di Hegel e le mucche del Wisconsin, Garzanti 1992
- I Barbari, La Repubblica 2006
- The Game, 2018

== Awards ==
- Prix Médicis étranger — France
- Selezione Campiello — Italy
- Viareggio – Italy
- Palazzo al Bosco – Italy
