= Jean-Louis Fournier =

French writer

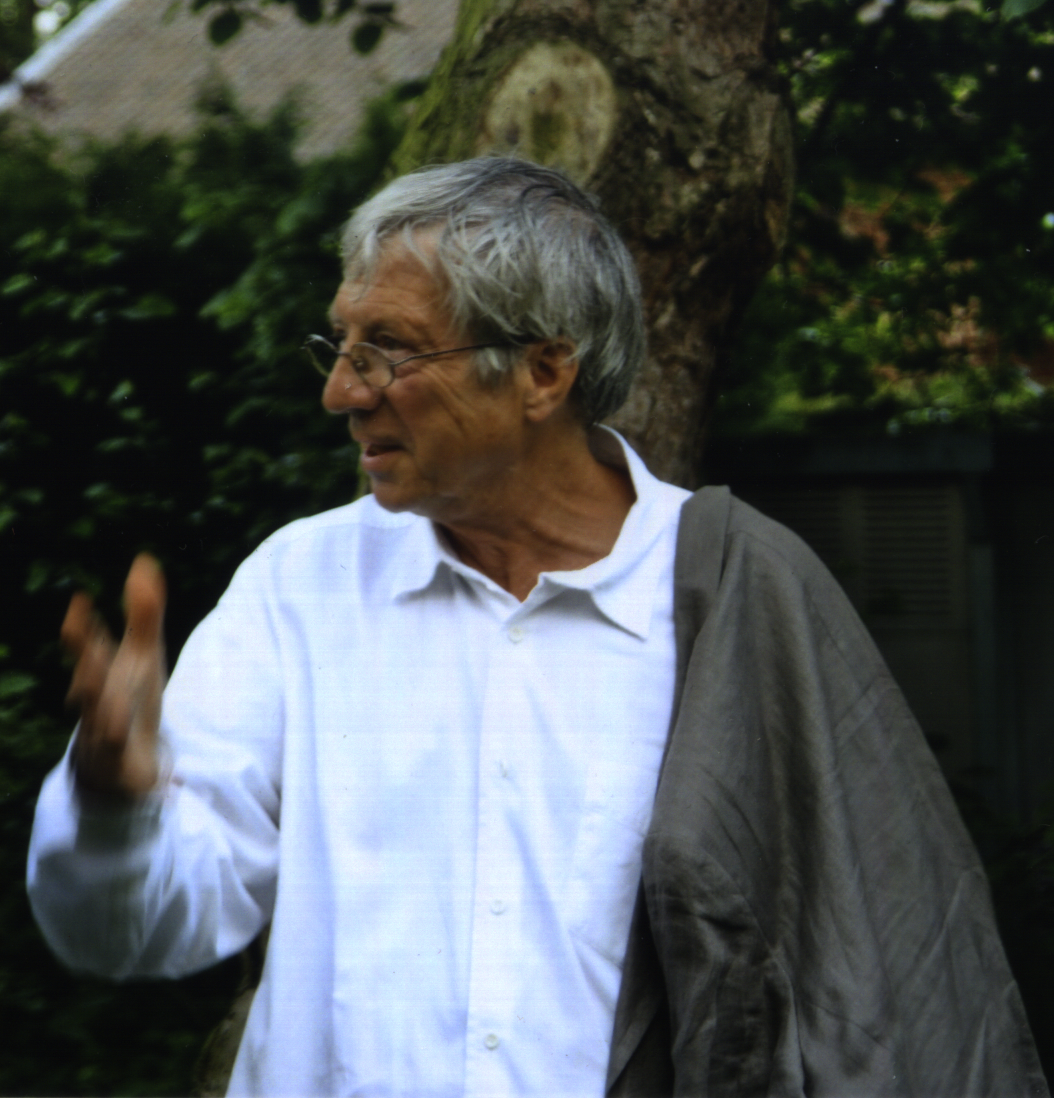
- Jean-Louis Fournier (2007)
- Born: 19 December 1938 (age 87); Calais
- Occupation: Writer
- Writing career
- Language: French
- Notable works: Où on va, papa?
- Notable awards: Prix Femina

Jean-Louis Fournier (born 19 December 1938, Calais) is a French writer, and winner of the Prix Femina, 2008, for Où on va, papa?.

== Biography ==
Jean Louis Fournier is the son of Dr Paul Léandre Emile Fournier and his wife Marie-Thérèse Françoise Camille Fournier née Delcourt. He studied at the Institut des hautes études cinématographiques (IDHEC), but left before finishing. In 2009, Fournier published his book Où On Va Papa?, in which he writes about the relationship between him and his two handicapped sons, Mathieu and Thomas. The book won him the Prix Femina; however, its controversial nature meant it had many critics, including the mother of the two boys.

== Works ==
- Grammaire française et impertinente, Payot, 1992, ISBN 978-2-228-88516-4
- Le curriculum vitae de Dieu, Seuil, 1995, ISBN 978-2-02-022019-4
- Les mots des riches, les mots des pauvres, Anne Carrière, 2004, ISBN 978-2-84337-253-7
- Le Petit Meaulnes, LGF/Le Livre de Poche, 2004, ISBN 978-2-253-10960-0
- Où on va, papa?, Stock, 2008, ISBN 9782234061170
  - Where We Going, Daddy?: Life with Two Sons Unlike Any Other, Translator Adriana Hunter, Other Press, 2010, ISBN 978-1-59051-338-5
- Veuf, Stock, 2011, ISBN 978-2-234-07089-9
