= The Legend of 1900 =

1998 film by Giuseppe Tornatore

- Italian theatrical film poster
- Directed by: Giuseppe Tornatore
- Screenplay by: Giuseppe Tornatore
- Based on: Novecento by Alessandro Baricco
- Produced by: Francesco Tornatore
- Starring: Tim Roth; Pruitt Taylor Vince; Mélanie Thierry; Bill Nunn; Peter Vaughan; Niall O'Brien; Gabriele Lavia; Alberto Vazquez; Clarence Williams III
- Cinematography: Lajos Koltai
- Edited by: Massimo Quaglia
- Music by: Ennio Morricone
- Production companies: Sciarlò; Medusa Film
- Distributed by: Medusa Film (Italy); Fine Line Features (International)
- Release date: 28 October 1998 (Italy)
- Running time: 165 minutes (original cut); 125 minutes (US cut)
- Country: Italy
- Languages: English; French; Italian
- Budget: $9 million
- Box office: $4 million (Italy) $20.6 million (2019 re-release)

The Legend of 1900 (Italian: La leggenda del pianista sull'oceano, lit. 'The Legend of the Pianist on the Ocean') is a 1998 Italian drama film written and directed by Giuseppe Tornatore, and starring Tim Roth, Pruitt Taylor Vince and Mélanie Thierry. Based on Alessandro Baricco's monologue Novecento, the film follows a foundling aboard an ocean liner in the first years of the 20th century, who grows up to be a musical prodigy without ever setting foot on land. The score was composed by Ennio Morricone.

The film was Tornatore's first English-language production. It premiered in Italy on 28 October 1998. It received several national and international awards, including six David di Donatello Awards and six Nastro d'Argento Awards. Morricone's soundtrack received multiple accolades, including the Golden Globe Award for Best Original Score.

== Plot ==
Musician Max Tooney goes to sell his prized Conn trumpet to a music shop, where he plays the instrument one last time. The shopkeeper recognises the song he plays as one on a record matrix he found and asks who the piece is by. Max tells him the story of a baby boy who was found abandoned in the first class dining room of the four stacker ocean liner SS Virginian on 1 January 1900. Danny Boodman, a coal-man from the boiler room, names the boy Danny Boodman T. D. Lemon 1900, after himself, the fruit crate the boy was found in, and the year, and raises him as his own.

Years later, Danny dies in a workplace accident and 1900 hides when the police come to place him in an orphanage; he is next seen playing the piano, despite never having been taught. 1900 shows a gift for music as he grows up and joins the ship's orchestra, which Max joined in 1927 and became friends with him. 1900 never leaves the vessel, claiming the outside world is too "big" for his imagination, and he learns about the outside world and new music trends from the ship's passengers. His reputation as a pianist becomes so renowned that famed New Orleans jazz musician Jelly Roll Morton boards the ship to challenge him to a piano duel. After hearing Morton's first tune, 1900 plays "Silent Night", a piece so simple and well known that Morton feels mocked and retaliates with "The Crave", so impressive it brings tears to 1900's eyes. 1900 then plays the same tune from memory, along with his original piece "Enduring Movement", with such virtuosity and speed that the metal piano strings become hot enough to light a cigarette, which he hands to Morton as a gesture of victory.

Hearing of 1900's prowess, a record producer comes aboard the Virginian to cut a demo record of one of his original compositions. 1900 creates a piece inspired by "The Girl", a young female passenger with whom he becomes enamored, and the only person he considers leaving the ship for. After making the recording, 1900 decides he does not want anyone to hear his music unless he performs it live, and attempts to give the master disc to The Girl. However, he is unable to give it to her before she departs, and is unable to leave the ship to join her, and so discards the record, which Max later finds and stores inside a piano.

Max leaves the orchestra in 1933. More than a decade later, the Virginian has been discontinued, the hull deserted and sunk offshore and scheduled to be scuttled. Hearing this, and that 1900's whereabouts are unaccounted for, Max persuades the demolition company in charge of the destruction to let him search the hull for him. After initially being unable to find him, Max locates the record with 1900's composition for sale; believing it would lure out 1900 from hiding, he attempts to steal it. He is however discovered, but when Max explains, the seller lends him the record and phonograph to play it. Max returns to the hull and plays the record throughout, eventually discovering 1900, who is immovable about sinking with the ship, being daunted by the immenseness of the world and unable to bring himself to leave the only home he has ever known. The two friends part ways and 1900 spends his final moments playing an imaginary piano as the hull explodes.

Having finished the story, Max begins to leave the store when the shopkeeper gives him back the trumpet, saying that "a good story is worth more than an old trumpet".

== Cast ==
- Tim Roth as 1900 (Danny Boodman T.D. Lemon 1900)
  - Roman Kuznietcov as 2-year-old 1900
  - Easton Gage as 4-year-old 1900
  - Cory Buck as 8-year-old 1900
- Pruitt Taylor Vince as Max Tooney
- Mélanie Thierry as The Girl
- Bill Nunn as Danny
- Heathcote Williams as Dr. Klauserman
- Clarence Williams III as Jelly Roll Morton
- Peter Vaughan as The Shopkeeper
- Niall O'Brien as Harbor Master
- Gabriele Lavia as Farmer
- Sidney Cole as Musician
- Harry Ditson as Captain Smith
- Kevin McNally as Senator Wilson
- Luis Molteni as First Class Passenger
- Amedeo Tommasi as Piano Tuner

== Production ==
The film was shot on-location in Odesa, Ukraine and Rome. The interior of the ocean liner RMS Virginian (patterned after the real liners RMS Lusitania and RMS Mauretania) were sets constructed at Cinecittà Studios.

== Reception ==
The Legend of 1900 received mixed critical reviews. On Rotten Tomatoes the film has an approval rating of 56% based on 41 reviews. On Metacritic, the film has a 58/100 rating based on 28 critics, indicating "mixed or average reviews".

The film grossed $4 million in Italy and $259,127 in the United States. On 15 November 2019 the film was given a wide release in China and made 130 million yuan (the equivalent of about $18.4 million) in its first two weeks.

=== Awards and nominations ===
Year	Institution	Category	Nominee	Result
1999	Camerimage	Best Cinematography	Lajos Koltai	Nominated
1999	David di Donatello	Best Cinematography	Lajos Koltai	Won
1999	David di Donatello	Best Costume Design	Maurizio Millenotti	Won
1999	David di Donatello	Best Director	Giuseppe Tornatore	Won
1999	David di Donatello	Best Music	Ennio Morricone	Won
1999	David di Donatello	Best Production Design	Francesco Frigeri	Won
1999	David di Donatello	Best Film	The Legend of 1900	Nominated
1999	David di Donatello	Best Screenplay	Giuseppe Tornatore	Nominated
1999	David di Donatello	Scholars Jury David	Giuseppe Tornatore	Won
1999	European Film Awards	Best Cinematographer (also for Sunshine)	Lajos Koltai	Won
1999	Italian National Syndicate of Film Journalists	Best Costume Design	Maurizio Millenotti	Won
1999	Italian National Syndicate of Film Journalists	Best Director	Giuseppe Tornatore	Won
1999	Italian National Syndicate of Film Journalists	Best Producer	Francesco Tornatore	Won
1999	Italian National Syndicate of Film Journalists	Best Production Design	Francesco Frigeri	Won
1999	Italian National Syndicate of Film Journalists	Best Screenplay	Giuseppe Tornatore	Won
1999	Italian National Syndicate of Film Journalists	Special Award	Ennio Morricone	Won
2000	Golden Globe Awards	Best Original Score	Ennio Morricone	Won
2000	Guild of German Art House Cinemas	Best Foreign Film	Giuseppe Tornatore	Won
2000	Satellite Awards	Best Art Direction and Production Design	Francesco Frigeri, Bruno Cesari	Nominated
2000	Satellite Awards	Best Original Score	Ennio Morricone	Nominated
