= Novecento (monologue) =

1994 theatrical monologue by Alessandro Baricco

- Author: Alessandro Baricco
- Original title: Novecento
- Translator: Ann Goldstein
- Language: Italian
- Publisher: Feltrinelli
- Publication date: October 1994
- Publication place: Italy
- English publication date: 2023
- Pages: 64
- ISBN: 978-8807895746

Novecento is a theatrical monologue written by Alessandro Baricco and published by Feltrinelli in 1994. The text was meant to be the script for a play directed by Gabriele Vacis and performed by Eugenio Allegri, which was first staged at the Asti Festival in July of the same year. The author described it as something between "a true staging and a story to be read aloud."

The book has been a commercial success in Italy and abroad, selling more than one million copies in the first sixteen years after publication and in 1998 it was adapted into a film titled The Legend of 1900, directed by Giuseppe Tornatore, with the characters Novecento and Tooney (named Max in the film) portrayed by Tim Roth and Pruitt Taylor Vince, respectively.

In 2022, Baricco launched an NFT derived from the work, called Novecento. The Source Code, which consists of a recording of the author reading the piece.

== Plot ==
The monologue is narrated by Tim Tooney, a trumpeter who played on the ocean liner Virginian. He tells the story of Danny Boodmann T.D. Lemon Novecento, a baby found abandoned on the ship on 1 January 1900, in a crate of lemons and secretly raised by a stoker who named him after himself, the year he was found—"Novecento" literally meaning "nine hundred"(or '900) in Italian—and the inscription (T.D.) on the crate. Novecento becomes a world-famous piano prodigy but never leaves the Virginian, living his entire life aboard the ship. With his music, he entertains first-class passengers and soothes the poor emigrants packed in third-class cabins, eagerly listening to their stories from dry land and transforming them into soulful compositions. Despite a fleeting desire to disembark and see the world, he fails to cope with its vastness, which cannot be encompassed, unlike his music, by a finite combination of keystrokes. Novecento chooses to remain on the ship until the very end, when the vessel, which has been his entire world, is set to be destroyed.

== See also ==
- Italian literature
