= Fra Fee =

Irish actor and singer (born 1987)

- Born: Francis Martin Fee; 20 May 1987 (age 39); Killyman, Northern Ireland
- Education: University of Manchester; Royal Academy of Music (2009)
- Occupation: Actor
- Years active: 2009–present
- Known for: Les Misérables; Lost Boys and Fairies
- Spouse: Declan Bennett (m. 2024)

Francis Martin "Fra" Fee (born 20 May 1987) is a Northern Irish actor and singer. He is best known for playing Courfeyrac in Tom Hooper's 2012 film adaptation of Les Misérables, and for his role as Kazi in the Disney+ series Hawkeye, which is set in the Marvel Cinematic Universe. Fee also played the role of Michael Carney in Jez Butterworth's The Ferryman at the Royal Court Theatre, West End, and Broadway, directed by Sam Mendes. For his performance, he won the 2018 WhatsOnStage Award for Best Supporting Actor in a Play.

== Early life and education ==
Fee was born in Dungannon, County Tyrone, Northern Ireland, and raised in rural Killyman. He attended St Patrick's Academy in Dungannon for his schooling. He began performing regularly with Bardic Theatre in his early days before pursuing music at the University of Manchester. Fee later went on to study at the Royal Academy of Music, where he graduated in 2009. In 2014, he was honoured as an Associate of the Royal Academy of Music.

== Career ==
Fee appeared in numerous productions at Belfast's Grand Opera House in conjunction with the Welsh National Opera, including The Beggar's Opera, The Mikado, Sweeney Todd, as well as a production of The Elixir of Love as Nemorino, directed by John Doyle. In 2004, he was a guest soloist for Irish tenor Ronan Tynan in Tynan's Dublin concert, titled "The Impossible Dream". Immediately following his graduation from the Royal Academy of Music, Fee was cast as Billy Kostecki in the West End production of Dirty Dancing.

He played Schlomo in the RTÉ Irish tour of Fame, before essaying the title role in Aladdin at Dublin's Gaiety Theatre. From June 2011 to 2012 he played Jean Prouvaire, and covered the roles of Marius and Enjolras in Les Misérables at the Queens Theatre, London. During his time in the West End production, Fee was cast as Courfeyrac in Tom Hooper's film Les Misérables, starring alongside Hugh Jackman as Jean Valjean and Russell Crowe as Javert.

From November to December 2012, Fee played Florizel in Howard Goodall's professional world premiere of A Winter's Tale.

Fee played Young Buddy in Stephen Sondheim's Follies at the Toulon Opera in March 2013, before playing Robbie in A Man of No Importance for Salisbury Playhouse.

On 16 June 2013, he portrayed Henrik Egerman in a special concert performance of Sondheim's A Little Night Music at the Yvonne Arnaud Theatre in Guildford, starring alongside Janie Dee, David Birell and Joanna Riding. On 2 August 2013, Fee was a guest soloist for BBC Radio 2's Friday Night Is Music Night singing America's Greatest Broadway Hits.

Fee starred in the title role of Candide at the Menier Chocolate Factory in London, alongside Scarlett Strallen as Cunegonde and David Thaxton as Maximillian, from 23 November 2013 to 22 February 2014. He later starred as Philip Ashley in Dublin's Gate Theatre production of Dame Daphne du Maurier's My Cousin Rachel, adapted for the stage by Joseph O'Connor at the Dock Street Theatre in Charleston, South Carolina as part of the Spoleto Festival USA from 22 May to 8 June 2014. In September 2014, he filmed the role of Kieran in Tom Lawes' forthcoming psychological thriller Monochrome, starring Jo Woodcock, Cosmo Jarvis and James Cosmo.

On 26 January 2015, Fee reprised the role of Henrik Egerman in A Little Night Music for one night only at the Palace Theatre in London's West End, reunited with previous co-stars Janie Dee as Desiree, David Birell as Frederick, Joanna Riding as Countess Malcolm as well as new cast members Jamie Parker as Carl Magnus and Anne Reid as Madame Armfeldt.

Fee made his Shakespeare debut as Romeo in Dublin's Gate Theatre's production of Romeo and Juliet directed by Wayne Jordan from March 2015 to May 2015.

In June 2015, Fee returned to Belfast to take up the role of Jamie in a production of Jason Robert Brown's The Last Five Years directed by Stephen Whitson, working alongside fellow West End actress Amy Lennox.

From September 2015 to 5 March 2016, Fee played the role of Amiens in Polly Findlay's production of As You Like It at the National Theatre in London starring Rosalie Craig as Rosalind. During this period he also played Man 2 in Stephen Sondheim's revue Putting It Together at the Lyric Theatre, Belfast, directed by Stephen Whitson (December 2015).

Fee played the role of Mole in the new musical adaptation of The Wind in the Willows with music by George Stiles, lyrics by Anthony Drewe and a book by Julian Fellowes in a production that starred Rufus Hound as Toad from August to November 2016.

In April 2017, he originated the role of Michael Carney in The Ferryman at the Royal Court Theatre, ahead of a transfer to the Gielgud Theatre in the West End. Fee played his final performance in the West End production on 6 January 2018. For his performance as Michael Carney in The Ferryman, Fee was awarded the 2018 WhatsOnStage Award for Best Supporting Actor in a Play.

In the spring of 2018, he filmed the role of Jim in the movie adaptation of Emma Jane Unsworth's novel Animals, directed by Sophie Hyde, starring alongside Holliday Grainger and Alia Shawkat. Filming took place in Dublin. The film premiered at the 2019 Sundance Film Festival.

He performed the role of Chip in John Wilson's production of Leonard Bernstein's On The Town on 25 August 2018 at the Royal Albert Hall, having performed two weeks earlier in the same venue as one of the Jets in John Wilson's production of West Side Story.

Fee reprised his role in the Broadway transfer of The Ferryman in New York alongside most of the original cast as well as newcomer to the play Fionnula Flanagan. The play won the Tony Award for Best Original Play at the 2019 Tony Awards. During his time in New York, Fee made his New York cabaret debut at 54 Below performing his show Seisún.

Fee plays William Bogue in Irish horror-comedy Boys From County Hell written and directed by Chris Baugh, due to premiere at TriBeCa Film Festival 2020. He plays Fergus in Irish Western Thriller Pixie, alongside Alec Baldwin, Olivia Cooke, and Ben Hardy.

In June 2019, Fee took part in a semi-staged concert version of The Clockmaker's Daughter, a musical by Michael Webborn and Daniel Finn, in which Fee also plays the same character in the studio cast recording, performing alongside Christine Allado and John-Owen Jones.

From October to December 2019, Fee replaced actor Colin Morgan in the role of Owen in the National Theatre's production of Brian Friel's Translations, directed by Ian Rickson, alongside Ciarán Hinds, Seamus O'Hara and Judith Roddy.

On 21 March 2022, Fee took over the role of The Emcee in Cabaret at the Playhouse Theatre, starring alongside Amy Lennox.

In June 2024, Fee starred as Andy in a miniseries for the BBC, Lost Boys and Fairies, where he and his partner Gabriel, played by Siôn Daniel Young, look to adopt a child.

== Reception ==
Reviewing Candide for The New York Times, Ben Brantley wrote that "Mr. Fee proved himself a most ingenious practitioner of ingenuousness, with a glorious tenor voice." Also reviewing for Candide Libby Purves noted that "Fra Fee from Dungannon is a real find: innocent elfin face but a voice so deep, honeyed and flawless that your heart melts." Reviewing My Cousin Rachel at the Dock Street Theatre, Charleston, Debra Charlton wrote "Playing the protagonist of this taut drama, Fra Fee portrays Philip's tormented journey through desire, guilt and suspicion with keen sensitivity and detail. His tour de force performance demonstrates immense emotional range and admirable control." "Fra Fee as Philip Ashley does most of the heavy lifting in My Cousin Rachel. Rarely offstage during the entire two-plus-hour performance, Fee's stamina is incredible. Without melodrama, he convincingly portrays his character's appropriately gothic emotional swings and perfectly captures Philip's tragic flaw of youthful impulsiveness."

== Personal life ==
Fee is gay and is married to actor and singer Declan Bennett, with whom he lives in rural Oxfordshire. The two married on 15 November 2024.

== Filmography ==
Year	Title	Role	Notes
2012	Les Misérables	Courfeyrac	National Board of Review Award for Best Cast; Satellite Award for Best Cast – Motion Picture; Washington D.C. Area Film Critics Association Award for Best Ensemble; Nominated – Broadcast Film Critics Association Award for Best Acting Ensemble; Nominated – Phoenix Film Critics Society Award for Best Cast; Nominated – San Diego Film Critics Society Award for Best Performance by an Ensemble
2016	Monochrome	Kieren	
2016	National Theatre Live: As You Like It	Amiens	
2018	Troubles	Liam	
2018	On the Town: BBC Proms	Chip	Televised Live Performance at the Royal Albert Hall
2019	Animals	Jim	Sundance Feb 2019 premiere; Adelaide Film Festival pop-up April 2019
2020	Boys from County Hell	William	
2020	Pixie	Fergus	
2021	Cinderella	Hench	
2021	The Laureate	Geoffrey Phibbs	Motion picture
2021	Hawkeye	Kazimierz "Kazi" Kazimierczak	Miniseries; 6 episodes
2021	Dalgliesh	Dominic Swayne	2 episodes
2022	Scrooge: A Christmas Carol	Harry Huffman	voice
2023	Rebel Moon	Regent Balisarius	
2024	Rebel Moon – Part Two: The Scargiver	Regent Balisarius	
2024	Lost Boys and Fairies	Andy	Miniseries for the BBC; 3 episodes
2025	Prime Target	Adam Mellor	Miniseries; 5 episodes
2026	Unchosen	Sam	6 episodes
2026	The Last Photograph	TBA	

== Theatre credits ==
Year	Title	Role	Theatre	Location
2009	Dirty Dancing	Billy Kostecki	Piccadilly Theatre	West End
2009–2010	A Man of No Importance	Robbie	Arts Theatre	West End
2010	Fame	Schlomo	—N/a	Irish National Tour
2011	Aladdin	Aladdin	Gaiety Theatre, Dublin	Dublin
2011–2012	Les Misérables	Jean Prouvaire u/s Marius & Enjolras	Queen's Theatre	West End
2012	A Winter's Tale	Florizel	Greenwich Theatre	Off-West End
2013	Follies	Young Buddy	Toulon Opera	Toulon
2013	A Man of No Importance	Robbie	Salisbury Playhouse	Salisbury
2013	A Little Night Music	Henrik Egerman	Yvonne Arnaud Theatre	Guildford
2013–2014	Candide	Candide	Menier Chocolate Factory	Off-West End
2014	My Cousin Rachel	Phillip Ashley	Gate Theatre	Off-West End
2015	A Little Night Music	Henrik Egerman	Palace Theatre	West End
2015	Romeo & Juliet	Romeo	Gate Theatre, Dublin	Dublin
2015	The Last Five Years	Jamie	Lyric Theatre, Belfast	Belfast
2015–2016	As You Like It	Amiens	National Theatre	London
2016	Putting It Together	Man 2	Lyric Theatre, Belfast	Belfast
2016	The Fix	Cal	Union Theatre	London
2016	The Wind in the Willows	Mole	—N/a	UK National Tour
2017–2018	The Ferryman	Michael Carney	Royal Court Theatre / Gielgud Theatre	Off-West End / West End
2018	West Side Story	A-Rab	Royal Albert Hall	London
2018	On The Town	Chip	Royal Albert Hall	London
2019	The Ferryman	Michael Carney	Bernard B. Jacobs Theatre	Broadway
2019	The Clockmaker’s Daughter	Will	Cadogan Hall	London
2019	Translations	Owen	National Theatre	London
2022	Cabaret	The Emcee	Playhouse Theatre	West End
2024	King Lear	Edmund	Almeida Theatre	Off-West End
2025	The Pillowman	Katurian	Gate Theatre	Dublin
2026	I'll Be Seeing You	Writer	Pitlochry Festival Theatre	Pitlochry, Scotland

== Awards ==
Year	Award	Category	Film	Result
2012	National Board of Review of Motion Pictures	Best Acting by an Ensemble	Les Misérables	Won
2012	National Board of Review of Motion Pictures	Best Ensemble	Les Misérables	Won
2012	San Diego Film Critics Society	Best Ensemble Performance	Les Misérables	Nominated
2012	Satellite Awards	Best Ensemble, Motion Picture	Les Misérables	Won
2012	Washington D.C. Area Film Critics Association	Best Acting Ensemble	Les Misérables	Won
(Source: IMDb.com)
