= Daf James =

Welsh playwright, screenwriter, composer, performer and translator

Dafydd James is a Welsh playwright, screenwriter, composer, performer, translator and academic working across theatre, radio, television and film in English and Welsh.

== Early life and education ==
James was raised in Cowbridge, Vale of Glamorgan and lives in Cardiff. He studied English literature at the University of Edinburgh where he graduated with a first-class degree in 2001. James then went on to train as a theatre-maker at the London International School of Performing Arts (LISPA) where the teaching style is influenced by the Jacques Lecoq school in Paris. He undertook a Doctor of Philosophy (PhD) in theatre studies at the University of Warwick under the supervision of Professor Baz Kershaw: his doctoral thesis was titled "Queer moments: the profound politics of performance" and was submitted in 2011.

== Theatrical works ==
In 2008 James performed, composed and co-wrote (with Ben Lewis) My Name is Sue at the Chapter Arts Theatre, Cardiff. He took the show to the Edinburgh Festival, 2009, where it was critically acclaimed and won a Total Theatre Award for Music and Theatre. It was described by the Guardian as "an exciting and original piece of work that boasts a laugh rate that would be the envy of most stand ups" and the "most bizarrely original, unexpected, and funny show currently playing in London. Maybe anywhere."

In 2010, James' first full-length play Llwyth [Tribe] was produced by the Sherman. A flamboyant fantasy on gay identity and Welshness it "announced James as a major new voice and pioneered a bold new Welsh-language theatrical vernacular". In an introduction to the play in Contemporary Welsh Plays it was described as a watershed play, which 'changed the landscape of Welsh-language theatre forever'. It won a Theatre Critics Wales Award and was selected for the Tapiei Arts Festival in Taiwan. A documentary following its journey – Llwyth: The Journey to Taiwan – was broadcast on S4C in 2013.

In 2016, James wrote Wonderman, an adaption of Roald Dahl's short stories as part of the Dahl centenary celebrations. It was co-produced by Gagglebabble and National Theatre Wales. He also composed the songs and wrote the lyrics for City of the Unexpected, Wales' largest ever cultural event, which more than 120,000 attended as part of the same celebrations.

Co-produced by Cape Town Opera and the Wales Millennium Centre, directed by Mellie Still, and written by Michael Williams, James was commissioned to compose the music to Tiger Bay: the musical. It received its world premiered in Artscape Opera House in Cape Town, South Africa, October 2017 before making its way to the Millennium Centre in Cardiff. Its cast included Dom Hartley-Harris, John Owen-Jones, Suzanne Packer, Noel Sullivan and Vikki Bebb. It received mixed reviews from the English and Welsh press; whilst South African reviews were positive.

In 2019, he was commissioned by Paines Plough to write a play for their Roundabout season, directed by Stef O'Driscoll, On the Other Hand, We're Happy. The play had a run at the Edinburgh festival where The Scotsman reported that "rarely amid this year's Fringe programme will such an uplifting and positively joyful play come with such a thick side order of tragedy' that 'lands in the heart of the audience like a hammer blow."

Later that year, Tylwyth, his follow up to Llwyth, was announced as a major new play. It premiered at the Sherman Theatre, Cardiff, co-produced with Theatr Genedlaethol Cymru. James was hailed as "One of Wales's most exciting playwrights" and the "best modern Welsh dramatist we have."

In 2022, On the Other Hand, We're Happy received its U.S. premiere in LA (produced by Rogue Machine Theatre and directed by Cameron Watson) where Charles McNulty in the LA Times opened his review of the piece stating the play "has my vote for best title" and went on to describe the show as that "proverbial needle in the theatrical haystack." The play won best production in the LA Drama Critics Circle award for theatrical excellence in 2023.

In 2023, James returned in a brand-new Sue show co-written with Ben Lewis called Songs from Across the Sueniverse for three sold-out previews. It was described as a life-affirming state of the nation musical about loneliness, transcendent joy, and small acts of kindness. James was described as an incredible performer and a master of physical comedy.

== Radio work ==
James's first work for radio in 2012 was the short-form comedy-drama Driving Home For Christmas an innovative collaboration between five writers across five different locations telling the story of a dysfunctional family battling their way towards the festivities. It was written in collaboration with Rachel Tresize, Philip Ralf, Kevin Dyer and Niall Griffiths and produced by Emma Bodger.

In 2014, he wrote Terrace for The Wire on Radio 3, directed by James Robinson.

My Mother Taught Me How to Sing in 2017, starring James as himself, was a docu-drama about losing a parent whilst becoming an adoptive Dad, was aired on BBC Radio 4 in February 2017. It was Julie Hesmondalgh's 'Pick of the Week' that following Sunday and was broadcast again in August 2020.

His follow up docu-drama, Graveyards in my Closet, the true story of a dark family secret, was broadcast on Radio 4 in August 2020. It starred Fflyn Edwards, Siw Hughes, Carys Eleri, Ifan Huw Dafydd, James' father, and the International Rugby Referee, Nigel Owens.

== Screenwriting ==
Broadcast between 2012 and 2015, James wrote ten episodes of Gwaith/Cartref for Fiction Factory and S4C.

Directed by Jeremy Dyson, James co-wrote sketches with Ben Lewis for the second series of Sky Arts Series Psychobitches, produced by Tiger Aspect in 2014.

In 2015, James wrote 'Abbatnoir' for Crackanory, Series 3, produced by Tiger Aspect and read by Sarah Millican.

James was part of the first generation of "Welsh Voices", a writers group for invited Welsh, or Wales-based, writers with the BBC Writers' Room.

In 2019 James developed Lost Boys and Fairies as part of the BBC Writers' Room's TV Drama Writers' Programme 2019 with Duck Soup. In 2023, with James as an executive producer and directed by James Kent, it was announced that filming had begun in and around Cardiff. The cast includes Sion Daniel Young, Fra Fee, Elizabeth Berrington, Sharon D Clarke and Maria Doyle Kennedy. Lost Boys and Fairies was first broadcast on Monday 3 June on BBC1 and iPlayer. The series has won the Seriencamp Official Competition Award.

== Translating work ==
James translated into Welsh Spring Awakening: a new musical by Steven Sater and Duncan Sheik for Theatr Genedlaethol Cymru in 2010 and 2011.

In 2013, Y Nyth, his translation of Jesper Wamsler's play The Flock was published by Gwasg Gomer.

He adapted Fabrice Melquiot's French play, Yuri, into Welsh and English in 2015. It was produced in both languages by August 2012, directed by Mathilde López. It was first performed at Chapter Arts Centre, Cardiff and was then performed at the Underbelly at the Edinburgh Festival in 2016.

In 2021, Un Bore Mawrth, his translation of Alison Carr's Tuesday was published by Nick Hern Books as well as Etifeddiaeth, his translation of his own play Heritage.

In 2021, it was announced that his translation of Wanted Petula by Fabrice Meqluiot – which mixes Welsh, English and French – would be produced by August 2021, Theatre Genedlaethol Cymru and National Theatre Wales. It was short-listed for the Best Show for Children and Young People in the UK Theatre Awards, 2022.
