= C'mon C'mon (film) =

- Theatrical release poster
- Directed by: Mike Mills
- Written by: Mike Mills
- Produced by: Chelsea Barnard; Lila Yacoub; Andrea Longacre-White
- Starring: Joaquin Phoenix; Gaby Hoffmann; Scoot McNairy; Molly Webster; Jaboukie Young-White; Woody Norman
- Cinematography: Robbie Ryan
- Edited by: Jennifer Vecchiarello
- Music by: Bryce Dessner; Aaron Dessner
- Production company: Be Funny When You Can
- Distributed by: A24
- Release dates: September 2, 2021 (Telluride); November 19, 2021 (United States)
- Running time: 108 minutes
- Country: United States
- Language: English
- Budget: $8.3 million
- Box office: $4.5 million

C'mon C'mon is a 2021 American drama film written and directed by Mike Mills, and starring Joaquin Phoenix, Gaby Hoffmann, Scoot McNairy, Molly Webster, Jaboukie Young-White, and Woody Norman. It had its world premiere at the 48th Telluride Film Festival on September 2, 2021, and was given a limited theatrical release by A24 starting on November 19, 2021. The film received critical acclaim, with praise for its performances, direction, and black-and-white cinematography.

== Plot ==
Johnny is a single, middle-aged radio journalist who is currently working on a project that entails traveling the country with his producing partners to interview children and teenagers about their lives and thoughts about the future. While in Detroit, he calls his sister Viv, with whom he has not spoken since their mother's death from dementia a year earlier. They have a nice conversation, and Viv asks Johnny if he can come to Los Angeles and watch her nine-year-old son Jesse, as she has to travel to Oakland to help Paul, her estranged husband and Jesse's father who struggles with bipolar disorder, get settled there. Johnny agrees, and he and Jesse quickly forge a bond as they get to know each other and Johnny shows Jesse how to operate his audio equipment.

Viv discovers Paul is doing worse than she had thought and feels she should stay in Oakland until she can convince him to seek medical attention, so Johnny, who needs to return to work, convinces Viv to let him take Jesse with him to his home in New York City. He finds caring for Jesse while trying to work increasingly difficult, and one night, after Jesse disappears at a store, Johnny snaps at his nephew. While trying to apologize, he lets slip that Viv is trying to help Paul, rather than just for a visit, but, eventually, Viv and Johnny are able to smooth things over with Jesse. From time to time, Jesse asks Johnny questions about his relationship with Viv and his personal life, and it is revealed that Johnny and Viv fought over how to care for their mother as her health deteriorated, that Johnny told Viv to leave Paul the first time Paul had issues with his mental health, and that Johnny was once in a long-term relationship with a woman, Louisa, whom he still loves.

Paul checks himself into a treatment center, but asks Viv if she will stay nearby until he is better, so Johnny, feeling confident, agrees to keep watching Jesse. When his producing partners begin to pressure him about an opportunity to interview some children in New Orleans and he loses Jesse on the street, however, he realizes he is in over his head and buys Jesse a plane ticket back to L.A. On the way to the airport, Jesse says he needs to use the bathroom, but then locks himself inside, saying he does not want to go home yet.

Johnny takes Jesse with him to New Orleans. He apologizes for wanting to send Jesse away, and the pair get back on good terms as Johnny works and they explore the city. When Viv calls with the news that Paul is doing much better and the doctors are sending him home, so she is coming to get Jesse, Jesse becomes upset and runs off. At first, he will only say that he is "fine", but Johnny helps him vent his frustrations by yelling and kicking the air. Jesse asks Johnny if he will be like his father when he grows up, and Johnny says he does not think so, as Viv has taught him how to deal with his emotions in a healthier way.

Viv flies to New Orleans and takes Jesse home. Back in New York, while listening to the recordings from New Orleans, Johnny hears a message from Jesse, in which he says that Johnny is probably his best friend. Johnny later sends Jesse a voice recording recounting their time together and reiterates a promise to remind Jesse about anything he forgets as he grows up.

== Cast ==
- Joaquin Phoenix as Johnny, a radio journalist
- Gaby Hoffmann as Viv, Johnny's sister, Jesse's mother, and Paul's wife
- Woody Norman as Jesse, Viv and Paul's son and Johnny's nephew
- Scoot McNairy as Paul, Viv's husband and Jesse's father
- Molly Webster as Roxanne, Johnny's co-worker
- Jaboukie Young-White as Fern, Johnny and Roxanne's assistant
- Deborah Strang as Carol, Johnny and Viv's mother
- Sunni Patterson as Sunni, who sets up the interviews in New Orleans

== Production ==
In September 2019, it was announced Joaquin Phoenix had been cast in the film, which Mike Mills would direct from a screenplay he wrote, and that A24 would handle distribution. Gaby Hoffmann joined the cast the following month, and Woody Norman's involvement was announced in February 2020.

Principal photography began in November 2019 and ended in January 2020. The film was shot, largely in sequence, in Detroit, Los Angeles, New York City, and New Orleans. In December 2019, Robbie Ryan revealed that he was working as the film's cinematographer.

In the film, Joaquin Phoenix's character, Johnny, works as a radio journalist. Co-star Molly Webster, who plays Roxanne, is a real-life public radio journalist and Senior Correspondent for WNYC's Radiolab. The children who appear in the interview scenes were not actors, and their authentic responses to Phoenix and Webster's questions were recorded for inclusion in the film.

== Music ==
The National's Aaron Dessner and Bryce Dessner, contributed to the film's score; the former made his feature film scoring debut. A soundtrack to the film, consisting of their score, released as their first album from A24 Music, the subsidiary music label of the producers, a week before the film's release, and preceded with "I Won't Remember?" as the lead single.

== Release ==
C'mon C'mon had its world premiere at the Telluride Film Festival on September 2, 2021. It screened at the Chicago International Film Festival, the Hamptons International Film Festival, the Mill Valley Film Festival, the New York Film Festival, the Rome Film Festival and the San Diego International Film Festival, among others. The film was given a limited theatrical release in the U.S. by A24 starting on November 19, 2021.

== Reception ==
=== Box office ===
In its opening weekend the film made $134,000 from five theaters, with its per-venue average of $26,800 being the best for a limited release since February 2020. Its second weekend, the film made $293,800 from 102 theaters, and its third, the film earned $462,022 from 565 theaters.

=== Critical response ===
On review aggregator website Rotten Tomatoes, the film has an approval rating of 94% based on 212 reviews, with an average score of 8.1/10; the site's critics consensus reads: "The sweet chemistry between Joaquin Phoenix and Woody Norman is complemented by writer-director Mike Mills' empathetic work, helping C'mon C'mon transcend its familiar trappings." On Metacritic, the film has a weighted average score of 82 out of 100, based on 43 critics, indicating "universal acclaim".

Filmmaker Kirsten Johnson praised the film, saying that it "inspires us all to be braver, more playful and more inventive in our quest to face the mess of this world we all share."

=== Accolades ===
Award	Date of ceremony	Category	Recipient(s)	Result	Ref.
Camerimage	November 20, 2021	Main competition	Robbie Ryan	Won	
Gotham Independent Film Awards	November 29, 2021	Outstanding Lead Performance	Joaquin Phoenix	Nominated	
Gotham Independent Film Awards	November 29, 2021	Outstanding Supporting Performance	Gaby Hoffmann	Nominated	
Detroit Film Critics Society	December 6, 2021	Best Breakthrough Performance	Woody Norman	Won (Note: Tied with Emma Seligman for Shiva Baby)	
Washington D.C. Area Film Critics Association Awards	December 6, 2021	Best Youth Performance	Woody Norman	Won	
Washington D.C. Area Film Critics Association Awards	December 6, 2021	Best Original Screenplay	Mike Mills	Nominated	
National Board of Review	December 3, 2021	Top 10 Independent Films	C'mon C'mon	Won	
Greater Western New York Film Critics Association	January 1, 2022	Best Picture	C'mon C'mon	Nominated	
Greater Western New York Film Critics Association	January 1, 2022	Best Lead Actor	Joaquin Phoenix	Nominated	
Greater Western New York Film Critics Association	January 1, 2022	Best Original Screenplay	Mike Mills	Nominated	
San Francisco Bay Area Film Critics Circle	January 10, 2022	Best Original Screenplay	Mike Mills	Won	
Austin Film Critics Association	January 11, 2022	Best Original Screenplay	Mike Mills	Nominated	
London Film Critics Circle Awards	February 6, 2022	Young British/Irish Performer of the Year	Woody Norman	Won	
Independent Spirit Awards	March 6, 2022	Best Feature	Chelsea Barnard, Lila Yacoub, and Andrea Longacre-White	Nominated	
Independent Spirit Awards	March 6, 2022	Best Director	Mike Mills	Nominated	
Independent Spirit Awards	March 6, 2022	Best Screenplay	Mike Mills	Nominated	
British Academy Film Awards	March 13, 2022	Best Actor in a Supporting Role	Woody Norman	Nominated	
Satellite Awards	April 2, 2022	Best Actor in a Motion Picture – Drama	Joaquin Phoenix	Nominated	
Satellite Awards	April 2, 2022	Best Original Screenplay	Mike Mills	Nominated	
Satellite Awards	April 2, 2022	Best Cinematography	Robbie Ryan	Nominated	
