= Sukkwan Island (film) =

- Promotional poster
- Directed by: Vladimir de Fontenay
- Written by: Vladimir de Fontenay
- Based on: Sukkwan Island by David Vann
- Produced by: Carole Scotta; Eliott Khayat; Caroline Benjo
- Starring: Swann Arlaud; Woody Norman; Ruaridh Mollica; Alma Pöysti
- Cinematography: Amine Berrada
- Edited by: Nicolas Chaudeurge
- Music by: Florent Chronie-De Maria; Jeremy Villecourt
- Production companies: Haut et Court; Maipo Film; Good Chaos; Versus Production; Aurora Studios
- Release dates: January 25, 2025 (Sundance); July 3, 2026 (United Kingdom)
- Countries: United Kingdom; Norway; France
- Language: English

Sukkwan Island (alternate title My Father’s Island in the United Kingdom) is a 2025 drama film directed by Vladimir de Fontenay and starring Swann Arlaud and Woody Norman. It is based on the novella of the same name by David Vann.

== Cast ==
- Swann Arlaud
- Woody Norman
- Ruaridh Mollica
- Alma Pöysti

== Production ==
In January 2024, it was announced that Arlaud, Norman, Mollica and Pöysti were cast in the film.

== Release ==
The film premiered at the 2025 Sundance Film Festival.

== Reception ==
On the review aggregator website Rotten Tomatoes, 46% of 13 critics' reviews are positive, with an average rating of 5.0/10.

Adam Solomons of IndieWire graded the film a C.

Jordan Mintzer of The Hollywood Reporter gave the film a positive review and wrote as a bottom line: “Immersive and well-acted, if finally underwhelming.”
