= Thomas Eccleshare =

English playwright

Thomas Eccleshare is an English playwright. He won the 2011 Verity Bargate Award for his debut play Pastoral.

He is also the founder and co-artistic director of Dancing Brick, a visual theatre company.

== Work ==
- Pastoral (2013)
- I'm Not Here Right Now (2015)
- Heather (2017)
- Instructions for Correct Assembly (2018) Royal Court Theatre
- Witness Number 3 (2022)
