= Too Rough =

Scottish short film

- Directed by: Sean Lìonadh
- Written by: Sean Lìonadh
- Produced by: Alfredo Covelli, Ross McKenzie
- Starring: Ruaridh Mollica; Joshua Griffin; Neshla Caplan; Kevin O'Loughlin; Oliver Wright; Jane McCarry
- Edited by: Sean Lìonadh
- Music by: Eloise Kretschmer
- Distributed by: Peccadillo Pictures
- Release dates: 25 January 2022 (Australia); 12 March 2022 (U.S.); 26 March 2022 (UK)
- Running time: 15 minutes
- Country: United Kingdom
- Language: English

Too Rough is a 2022 Scottish short film written and directed by Sean Lìonadh and starring Ruriadh Mollica and Joshua Griffin. The film is set in Glasgow, Scotland and follows the character of Nick who, following a night of partying and intoxication, wakes up next to his boyfriend Charlie and must conceal him from his own homophobic and dysfunctional family.

Following its world premiere at the Flickerfest International Short Film Festival in Sydney, Australia on 25 January 2022, the film went on to receive international recognition and has achieved awards including the 2022 BAFTA Scotland award for Best Short Film, Best British Short Film at the 2022 British Independent Film Awards and the 2022 Berlin Interfilm Festival award for Best Live Action.

== Plot ==
The film follows the story of Nick (Ruaridh Mollica), a gay, working class young adult, and his boyfriend Charlie (Joshua Griffin).

After a night of heavy drinking at a house party in Glasgow's West End, Nick invites Charlie to stay over at his parents’ house. When they wake up the following morning, Nick panics and attempts to conceal Charlie from his alcoholic parents and dysfunctional life at home.

== Production ==
The film was written and directed by Glasgow-born filmmaker and musician Sean Lìonadh and is based on experiences from his own life and upbringing.

The film was shot on location in Glasgow, Scotland.

== Awards and nominations ==
Awards

- Berlin Interfilm Festival 2022 - Award for Best Live Action (Sean Lìonadh)
- BAFTA Scotland Awards 2022 - Award for Best Short Film (Sean Lìonadh, Alfredo Covelli and Ross McKenzie)
- British Independent Film Awards 2022 - Award for Best British Short (Sean Lìonadh, Alfredo Covelli and Ross McKenzie)
- Galway Film Fleadh 2022 - Award for Best International Short Fiction (Sean Lìonadh)
- Provincetown International Film Festival 2022 - Award for Best Queer Short (Sean Lìonadh)
- Ale Kino! International Young Audience Film Festival 2022 - Award for Best Short Film for Young People (Sean Lìonadh)
- Glasgow Short Film Festival 2022 - Scottish Short Film Award Special Mention (Sean Lìonadh) & Scottish Audience Award (Sean Lìonadh)
- London Short Film Festival 2023 - Award for Best UK Short (Sean Lìonadh)
- Festival International Du Film De Vebron 2022 - Grand Prize (Sean Lìonadh)
- Scottish Mental Health Arts and Film Festival 2022 - Festival Award Best Short Drama (Sean Lìonadh) & Grand Jury Prize International Film Competition (Sean Lìonadh)
- This is England Film Festival Rouen 2022 - Special Mention Best Film (Sean Lìonadh)
- Contis International Film Festival 2022 - Prix Spécial du Jury European Competition (Sean Lìonadh) & Mention Spéciale du Jury Jeunes European Short Film Competition (Sean Lìonadh)
- LesGaiCineMad, Madrid International LGBT Film Festival 2022 - Best International Short (Sean Lìonadh) & Audience Award Best Short Film (Sean Lìonadh)
- Edinburgh Short Film Festival - Award for Best Scottish Short Film (Sean Lìonadh)
- Ibicine 2023 - Best Foreign Short Film (Sean Lìonadh)
- Sicilia Queer Filmfest 2022 - Special Mention Palermo Pride Queer Shorts (Sean Lìonadh)
- Magma: Mostra di Cinema Breve 2022 - Special Mention International Competition (Sean Lìonadh)
- Fenêtres sur Courts 2022 - Jury Special Mention European Competition (Sean Lìonadh)
- Festival Internacional de Cine de Cartagena 2022 - City of Cartagena Silver Caravel Award for Best Short Film (Sean Lìonadh)

Nominations

- SXSW Film Festival 2022 - Nomination for SXSW Grand Jury Award for Narrative Short (Sean Lìonadh)
- Merlinka Festival 2022 - Nomination for Best Short Film Jury Prize
