= Electric Cinema, Notting Hill =

Cinema in Notting Hill, London, England

The Electric Cinema
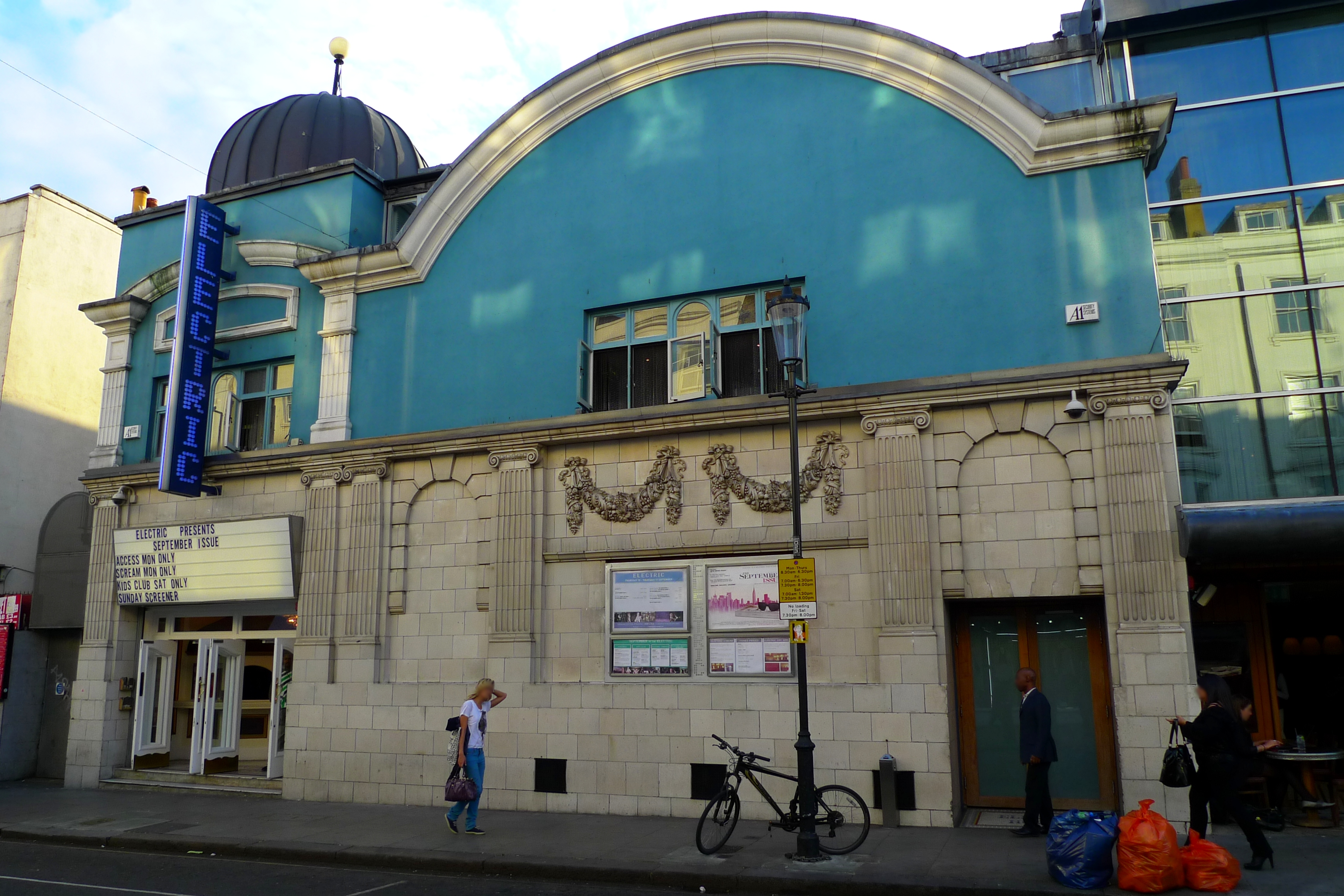
- The Electric Cinema
- Interactive map of the The Electric Cinema area
- Alternative names: Electric Screen, Imperial Playhouse Theatre, Electric Cinema Club

General information
- Type: Cinema
- Architectural style: Edwardian Baroque
- Location: 191 Portobello Road, London, United Kingdom
- Coordinates: 51.5155°N 0.2050°W
- Opened: February 1910
- Closed: 1993 (re-opened in 2001)
- Management: Soho House

Design and construction
- Architect: Gerald Seymour Valentin

Other information
- Seating capacity: 83

Website
- electriccinema.co.uk

The Electric Cinema is a cinema in Notting Hill, London.

One of the oldest working film theatres in Britain, it became Britain's first black-owned cinema in 1993, and remained so until it was sold in 2000.

As of 2022, after several changes in ownership, the cinema is also known as the Electric Portobello, with a second screen at the old Television Centre at White City called the Electric White City.

== History ==
The Electric Cinema first opened in London's Portobello Road on 24 February 1910. It was one of the first buildings in Britain to be designed specifically for motion picture exhibition, and one of the first in the area to be supplied with electricity. It was built shortly after its namesake the Electric Cinema in Birmingham, which predates it by around two months. Its first film was Henry VIII, screened on 23 February 1911.

The venue opened 18 years before sound films (talkies) became standard, so had no facilities to broadcast sound. The cinema was soon eclipsed by the huge picture palaces that became fashionable during the 1930s but, despite being shuttered for brief periods, it has remained in almost continual use until the present day.

Designed by architect Gerald Seymour Valentin in the Edwardian Baroque style, it originally opened as the Electric Cinema Theatre, with 600 seats. During World War I an angry mob attacked the Electric, believing that its German-born manager was signalling to Zeppelin raiders from the roof, after nearby Arundel Gardens was hit by a bomb dropped from a Zeppelin.

Later, in 1932, the Electric became the Imperial Playhouse cinema, though by this time the Portobello Road area had become run down, along with the rest of Notting Hill. During this time, the venue's nickname among locals was "The Bughole".

During the Second World War the venue was attended by up to 4000 per week, despite the Luftwaffe's night-time bombing raids. During the late 1940s the notorious mass murderer John Christie (1899–1953) of nearby 10 Rillington Place is said to have worked at the Electric as a projectionist

In the late 1960s the venue changed its name to the Electric Cinema Club, showing mostly independent and avant garde films. In 1984 the then-owners Mainline Pictures proposed to turn the venue into an antiques market; a petition against these plans reached over 10,000 signatures, including those of Audrey Hepburn and Anthony Hopkins.

Thereafter it opened and closed several times without finding commercial success. In 1992 it went into voluntary receivership and tried to find a buyer. In July 1993 Paul Bucknor assembled a consortium including Choice FM and The Voice that moved in, with the aim of promoting black film effectively making it the first black-owned cinema in the UK. They were said to have paid almost £1 million to prepare the building for the Notting Hill Carnival in August 1993.

== Modern era and revival ==
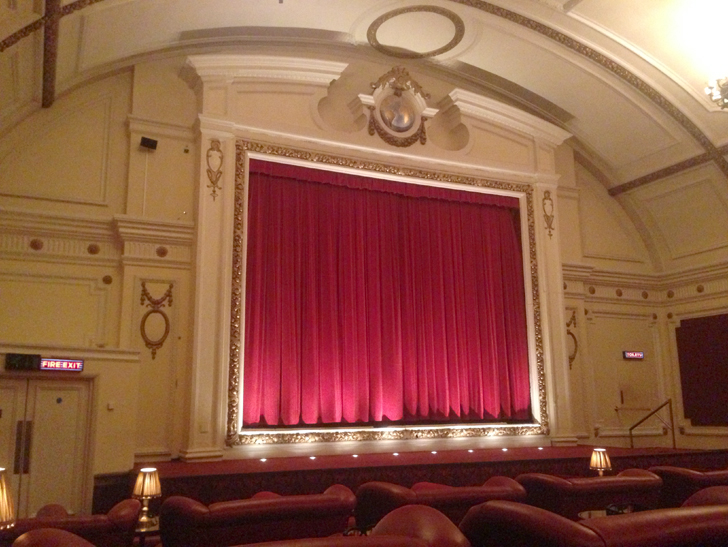
Interior of the Electric Cinema Notting Hill, May 2013

In the late 1990s the site was acquired by local property developer, European Estates and architects, Gebler Tooth. Four years of planning followed in which Gebler Tooth developed the plan that would re-establish the commercial viability of the theatre. The critical element was acquiring the shop next door which would provide space for upgraded toilets, an air conditioning plant and restaurant.

In 2000 the site was acquired by its current owner, the retail entrepreneur Peter Simon, who at the beginning of his career had traded from a market stall outside. Simon invested £5m in the restoration of the Edwardian façade and interior before leasing the site to Soho House.

It is a Grade II* Listed building. On 9 June 2012, the building was evacuated due to a fire, and remained closed until it reopened on 3 December 2012.
