= Detroit Film Critics Society Award for Best Breakthrough Performance =

Annual US film award

This is a list of the annual winners of the Detroit Film Critics Society Award for Best Breakthrough Performance.

== 2010s ==
- 2017: Jordan Peele, Get Out
  - Timothée Chalamet
  - Gal Gadot
  - Tiffany Haddish. Girls Trip
  - Caleb Landry Jones
- 2018: Bo Burnham, Eighth Grade
  - Rafael Casal and Daveed Diggs, Blindspotting
  - Elsie Fisher, Eighth Grade
  - Lady Gaga, A Star Is Born
  - Boots Riley, Sorry to Bother You
- 2019: Florence Pugh
  - Ana de Armas, Knives Out
  - Jessie Buckley
  - Kaitlyn Dever
  - Aisling Franciosi, The Nightingale
  - Paul Walter Hauser
  - Lulu Wang, The Farewell
  - Olivia Wilde, Booksmart

== 2020s ==
- 2020: Maria Bakalova, Borat Subsequent Moviefilm
  - Jasmine Batchelor, The Surrogate
  - Radha Blank, The Forty-Year-Old Version
  - Orion Lee, First Cow
  - Wunmi Mosaku, His House
- 2021: Woody Norman, C'mon C'mon and Emma Seligman, Shiva Baby
  - Alana Haim, Licorice Pizza
  - Emilia Jones, CODA
  - Agathe Rousselle, Titane
