= Dreamland (TV series) =

- Genre: Comedy-drama
- Created by: Sharon Horgan
- Based on: Morgana Robinson's Summer by Sharon Horgan
- Written by: Gabby Best; Sarah Kendall; Emma Jane Unsworth; Sharma Angel-Walfall
- Directed by: Ellie Heydon
- Starring: Freema Agyeman; Lily Allen; Frances Barber; Gabby Best; Aimee-Ffion Edwards; Sheila Reid; Kiell Smith-Bynoe
- Country of origin: United Kingdom
- Original language: English
- No. of seasons: 1
- No. of episodes: 6

Production
- Executive producers: Clelia Mountford; Sharon Horgan; Alex Moody
- Producer: Jane Bell
- Production company: Merman

Original release
- Network: Sky Atlantic
- Release: 6 April – 11 May 2023

Dreamland is a British comedy drama television series created by Sharon Horgan and based on her 2017 Sky Arts short Morgana Robinson's Summer. It premiered on 6 April 2023 on Sky Atlantic.

== Premise ==
Set in the British seaside town of Margate, three sisters are about to have their world turned upside down when their other sister suddenly returns.

== Cast and characters ==
=== Main ===
- Freema Agyeman as Trish
- Lily Allen as Mel
- Frances Barber as Cheryl/Mum
- Gabby Best as Clare
- Aimee-Ffion Edwards as Leila
- Sheila Reid as Nan
- Kiell Smith-Bynoe as Spence

=== Supporting ===
- Samantha Bond as Orla
- Jamie Bisping as Sammy
- Eddison Burch as Jordan
- Hugh Coles as Dom
- Emily Barber as Eva
- Sam Fletcher as James
- Nigel Planer as Hamish
- Martina Laird as Diane
- Joy Richardson as Elizabeth
- Ed Macarther as Liam
- Alistair Green as the Mayor
- Angela Sims as Simone Willmott
- Colin Hurley as Giant Rabbit man
- Charlie Coletta as Jemina
- Dean Kirby as Barman
- Halema Hussain as Doctor Pranto
- Hywel Simons as Doctor Bencoe
- Kevin Yates as Iona Muff
- Madeleine Bowyer as Doctor Yvonne Halcrow
- Nick Wilton as Doctor Beany
- Stephanie Fayerman as Sue
- Toby Longworth as Cabbie

== Episodes ==
No.	Title	Directed by	Written by	Original release date
1	"Episode 1"	Ellie Heydon	Emma Jane Unsworth, Sarah Kendall, Gabby Best	6 April 2023
2	"Episode 2"	Ellie Heydon	Gabby Best	13 April 2023
3	"Episode 3"	Ellie Heydon	Emma Jane Unsworth	20 April 2023
4	"Episode 4"	Ellie Heydon	Gabby Best	27 April 2023
5	"Episode 5"	Ellie Heydon	Sharma Angel-Walfall	4 May 2023
6	"Episode 6"	Ellie Heydon	Sarah Kendall	11 May 2023

== Production ==
=== Development ===
A television adaptation of Horgan's short was in development as of July 2019. Ellie Heydon serves as lead director. Dreamland is produced by Horgan and Celia Mountford's Merman Films in association with Sky Studios. Jane Bell produces, with Alex Moody of Sky as executive producer, and Emma Jane Unsworth was named showrunner and associate producer. Gabby Best, Sharma Walfall and Sarah Kendall joined Unsworth in the writers' room.

In June 2022, it was revealed Lily Allen would make her television acting debut in Dreamland. The following month, Freema Agyeman was announced as Allen's co-lead. Gabby Best, Aimee-Ffion Edwards, and Frances Barber would reprise their roles from Morgana Robinson's Summer. Also joining the cast were Kiell Smith-Bynoe and Sheila Reid; Samantha Bond would guest star.

Principal photography began on location in Margate, Kent in summer 2022. Among the locations used were the town's tidal pool, the Dalby Cafe, and the Winter Gardens. Allen was spotted on set in July. Filming also took place in London.

== Broadcast ==
The series premiered on 6 April 2023 on Sky Atlantic.

== Reception ==
Rachel Aroesti in The Guardian remarked that "Stretched out over a series arc, Dreamland is a paler, flabbier and altogether sunnier proposition than the lean, mean, spiky short it is based on. Brutal naturalism is out, misty-eyed warmth is in" and awarded it three out of five stars. Isobel Lewis in The Independent also awarded three out of five stars.
