= The Uprising (2026 film) =

Historical action drama film by Paul Greengrass

- Theatrical release poster with the original release date
- Directed by: Paul Greengrass
- Written by: Paul Greengrass
- Produced by: Jason Blum; Paul Greengrass; Gregory Goodman; Joanna Kaye; Joe Neurauter; Lars Sylvest
- Starring: Andrew Garfield; Jamie Bell; Stephen Dillane; Tom Hollander; Cosmo Jarvis; Thomasin McKenzie; Jonny Lee Miller; Woody Norman; Katherine Waterston
- Cinematography: Pål Ulvik Rokseth
- Edited by: William Goldenberg
- Music by: Volker Bertelmann
- Production companies: Blumhouse Atomic Monster; Thank You Pictures; Supernix
- Distributed by: Entertainment Film Distributors (United Kingdom); Leonine Distribution (Germany); Focus Features (United States)
- Release dates: 10 September 2026 (United States); 9 October 2026 (United Kingdom)
- Running time: 128 minutes
- Countries: United Kingdom; Germany; United States
- Language: English
- Budget: $20 million
- Box office: $10.2 million

The Uprising (briefly marketed in the US as The Uprising: The Rise of Robin Hood) is a 2026 historical action drama film written, produced and directed by Paul Greengrass. It stars Andrew Garfield, Jamie Bell, Stephen Dillane, Tom Hollander, Cosmo Jarvis, Thomasin McKenzie, Jonny Lee Miller, Woody Norman and Katherine Waterston. It dramatises the 1381 Peasants' Revolt in England, with Bell and Jarvis portraying the revolt's main leaders, John Ball and Wat Tyler, respectively, with Garfield portraying a fictitious unnamed ploughman.

The film was released theatrically in the US on 10 September 2026 and released in the UK on 9 October. It received mixed reviews from critics, who praised its performances, action sequences, and contemporary social relevance, but criticised its bleak tone and aesthetics, Greengrass's signature handheld shaky camera style, and the Robin Hood-inspired epilogue.

== Plot ==
In 1381, in the wake of the Black Death that killed half the population, England is ruled by the council of Richard II, who at 14 years old is too young and too disturbed by terrifying nightmares of mobs of demons to rule on his own. The kingdom needs more revenue, necessitating an increase in taxes. The council determines that taxing the Church or the merchant class is politically untenable, so they will increase taxes on the peasantry.

A ploughman, who lost his wife and two children to the plague while surviving it himself, comes to town to pay his annual taxes. The townspeople complain to the tax collector that taxes have been raised to the point that they can no longer survive on their remaining yield. The collector demands that the Ploughman pay death taxes again on his family since he lacks documentation of their death seven years prior. After seeing soldiers rape two girls, the Ploughman accosts the tax collector and kills a soldier who tries to arrest him.

The Ploughman's actions inspire peasant revolts across England, which come to be led by the Ploughman; Wat Tyler, who served the king's late father in the military; and John Ball, a priest with egalitarian views who was branded a heretic by the Church and imprisoned before being freed by the rebels.

The rebels decide they will march to London to petition the king, who they see as just and fair but held hostage by his council. At the advice of the council, the king, who sees the rebels as his nightmare come true, takes a boat down the River Thames to present himself to the rebels from a distance, but does not personally meet them or hear their petition, and in response the rebels march on and ransack London. With the king's armies still days away, having to be recalled from campaigns in Scotland and France, the council persuades him to accept the rebels' demands to convince them to disperse, and then have his armies slaughter them later.

The king meets the rebels and tells them he will grant them self-determination and clemency at the Priory of St John the next day, and in the meantime they may seek justice against his council, who they see as traitors. The members of the council are captured by a mob and beheaded in the streets. The night progresses into looting and the beheading of merchants, to the horror of the Ploughman, Tyler, and Ball, who struggle to control the mob.

In the morning, the rebels go to meet the king. The king secretly has Tyler killed, and persuades the rebels to lay down their arms and follow him into a trap. The Ploughman learns of the king's treachery but is unable to warn the rebels in time. Ball and most of the rebels are slaughtered, while the Ploughman and Alyce escape with a few survivors.

One year later, the king is travelling through a forest when he is ambushed by a group of archers. The Ploughman, now dressed in a green-hooded garb, reveals himself as their leader before deciding to spare the king as killing him would not solve anything; the Ploughman instead says that he and his gang live beyond the king's rule, and that their defiance will torment the king forever. Some time later, the king's palace is shown under a cloudy thundering sky while the king is heard screaming wildly.

== Cast ==
- Andrew Garfield as The Ploughman
- Jamie Bell as John Ball
- Stephen Dillane as Simon Sudbury
- Tom Hollander as Sir Robert Hales
- Cosmo Jarvis as Wat Tyler
- Thomasin McKenzie as Alyce
- Jonny Lee Miller as William Walworth
- Woody Norman as Richard II of England
- Katherine Waterston as Joan of Kent
- Stanley Townsend as Robert Bealknap
- Gerald Tyler as Thomas Beauchamp, 12th Earl of Warwick
- Simon Kunz as Sir John Newton
- Sky Yang as The Scribe
- Jamie Maclachlan as Walworth's lieutenant
- Dónal Finn as a village priest

== Production ==
In May 2022, Deadline Hollywood reported that Paul Greengrass would be writing and directing The Hood, with Benedict Cumberbatch cast to star in the film, and with FilmNation Entertainment producing it alongside Tyler Thompson, who would also serve as producer under the Cross Creek Pictures banner.

No further announcements were made on the project until February 2025, when it was announced that the film was retitled The Rage and Matthew McConaughey was set to star in the film instead of Cumberbatch. Jason Blum joined the project as a producer through his Blumhouse Productions banner, replacing Tyler Thompson and Cross Creek Pictures which had dropped the feature. By May, McConaughey had departed the film, and Andrew Garfield was in negotiations to take on the lead role while Focus Features was nearing a deal estimated at around $11 million for domestic distribution rights. In June 2025, Thomasin McKenzie was rumoured to have joined the cast. On September 4, it was officially announced that Katherine Waterston and Andrew Garfield had been cast. On October 13, the film was retitled The Uprising, and it was officially announced that Jamie Bell, Thomasin Mckenzie, Cosmo Jarvis, Jonny Lee Miller and Woody Norman had been cast. On October 20, it was officially announced that Stephen Dillane, Tom Hollander, Stanley Townsend and Sky Yang had been cast.

=== Filming ===
Principal photography took place from September to November 2025, utilising up to 5,000 extras in total.

Filming primarily was conducted across the Upper Bavaria and Franconia regions in Germany. Key filming locations included:

- Upper Bavaria
  - Penzing Studios
- Franconia
  - Nuremberg
  - Lichtenau Fortress (Festung Lichtenau)
  - Franconian Open-Air Museum
  - Bad Windsheim

== Marketing ==
The film was initially marketed in both the US and UK under the title The Uprising as a realistic historical drama based on the 1381 Peasants' Revolt, and the early promotional materials for the film gave no indication that it was about Robin Hood. Then, on 20 August (only three weeks before the film's scheduled US release date), the film's US distributor Focus Features released a new trailer that unexpectedly changed the title of the film to The Uprising: The Rise of Robin Hood and featured clips of Garfield's character dressed in green, wearing a mask, and wielding a bow, implying that he was Robin Hood. Alongside this trailer, Focus Features released a new synopsis: "Set against the true events of the Uprising that helped inspire the legend of Robin Hood, [Andrew Garfield's character] forms an army of the people to face the King's might in a fight for justice."

By contrast, the film's UK distributor, Entertainment Film Distributors, issued a conflicting statement: "The Uprising is a historical epic about the Peasants' Revolt of 1381, not Robin Hood. The UK marketing campaign does not make any reference to Robin Hood. Marketing materials posted by other countries that may appear in the UK online and on social media referencing Robin Hood are not issued or approved by us."

The conflicting marketing campaigns led to widespread confusion about the title and subject matter of the film. The Guardian labelled the situation a "marketing meltdown", while The Independent described the rebranding as "bizarre". Social media users and news outlets alike criticised the attempt to incorporate Robin Hood into the story. Some said that it would be anachronistic for Robin Hood to appear in a film set in 1381, since Robin Hood is already mentioned in the Piers Ploughman (which was most likely composed in the 1370s, before the Peasants' Revolt), and previous Robin Hood adaptations had generally set the story in the late twelfth century during the reign of Richard the Lionheart (nearly two centuries earlier). Others said that the Robin Hood connection was unlikely to help the film succeed, given that there had already been many previous Robin Hood adaptations, including The Death of Robin Hood, which had underperformed at the box office in June 2026. By contrast, many viewed the story of the Peasants' Revolt (which had never before received a film adaptation) as exciting and contemporarily relevant on its own.

== Release ==
The Uprising was released in the United States on 10 September 2026, pushed up by a day from its original date of 11 September. Originally scheduled for a theatrical release in the United Kingdom on 11 September as well, Entertainment Film Distributors subsequently postponed its release to 9 October instead.

== Reception ==
=== Box office ===
In the United States and Canada, The Uprising was released alongside Practical Magic 2, Hope, Runner, and Oasis: Don't Look Back in Anger, and was projected to gross around $5 million from 2,055 theaters in its opening weekend. It ended up debuting to $3.3 million, finishing in eighth.

=== Critical response ===
On the review aggregator website Rotten Tomatoes, 57% of 122 critics' reviews are positive, with an average rating of 6.0/10. The website's consensus reads: "Paul Greengrass' cinéma vérité-styled medieval epic draws most of its potency from the evergreen rage of wealth inequality, but its mingling of history and myth proves more awkward than enlightening." Metacritic, which uses a weighted average, assigned the film a score of 56 out of 100, based on 39 critics, indicating "mixed or average" reviews. Audiences polled by CinemaScore gave the film an average grade of "B–" on an A+ to F scale.

In a mixed review for Variety, Michael Phillips described The Uprising as "a well-acted blur of fits and starts"; he praised Garfield, Waterston, McKenzie, and Bell's acting, but criticized the attempt to tie the film into the Robin Hood legend and described Greengrass's "shaky" camera style and use of panoramic drone shots as distracting and unsuited to the historical subject of the film. In a review for Collider, Meredith Loftus described The Uprising as "a well-made historical drama with pertinent themes", but criticized Focus Features' decision to market it as a Robin Hood film, writing, "Rather than letting it stand on its own, the new tagline suggests that the studio doesn't trust its audience to see it without obvious IP at the forefront."

In a review for The Wrap, William Bibbiani characterised The Uprising as a strong film with a powerful emotional story arc and fitting initial conclusion that was completely ruined by its Robin Hood-inspired epilogue, which he perceived as having been spuriously tacked on to give the otherwise bleak film a more upbeat ending to appease studio executives, similar to the ending of F. W. Murnau's The Last Laugh, writing, "The Uprising is such a tragic rug pull, sullying its hard-earned good will at the last possible minute, that it's hard to appreciate anything that happened before the disappointment sank in." In a review for Daily Express, George Simpson echoed this sentiment, praising the main characters' acting and the action sequences, but describing the epilogue as "bizarre" and "anachronistic".

In a positive review for Deadline, Pete Hammond praised The Uprising as "crackerjack action film", with a "roaring" pace, a "well chosen" cast, and "top drawer" production values. He also highlighted the film's contemporary resonance, saying that the film's setting shortly after the Black Death parallels its release date shortly after the COVID-19 pandemic, while its depiction of corrupt oligarchs using their positions to enrich themselves while oppressing the peasantry echoes growing wealth inequality in the present day. In a largely positive review for CBR, Rachel Leishman praised the film's whole cast as "absolutely stellar", its action sequences as "elevat[ing]", and Greengrass's camera style as "feel[ing] like the HBO series Succession", but she criticized the film for not having enough Robin Hood in it, writing, "the movie overall could have benefited from more men in tights".

By contrast, in a negative review for The Guardian, Owen Myers described The Uprising as a "grim and depressingly generic period piece", "a disjointed slog through the mud with the emotional depth of a History Channel rerun", and "about as fun as trench foot". He specifically criticised Garfield's Ploughman character as generic and lacking "any particular magnetism or spice", the film's dreary aesthetic for its "sludge-grey sky, scratchy brown sacks that everyone wears and the fact that no one seems to have had a wash in weeks", and Greengrass's handheld camera style, writing, "the only uprising I felt during the seasick fight scenes was my breakfast threatening to return on me".

In a negative review for /Film, Jeremy Mathai described The Uprising as "a dull, dreary disappointment", criticising Greengrass's handheld camera style as "completely at odds with a historical period piece", the script as "half-baked", the characters as underdeveloped, and the action sequences as "perfunctory" and "never in focus".
