= Lost Boys and Fairies =

British television series

- Gabriel (Siôn Daniel Young) and Andy (Fra Fee) in the first episode
- Genre: Drama
- Created by: Daf James
- Directed by: James Kent
- Starring: Siôn Daniel Young; Fra Fee; Leo Harris; Elizabeth Berrington; Sharon D. Clarke; Maria Doyle Kennedy; William Thomas; Arwel Gruffydd
- Country of origin: United Kingdom
- Original languages: English; Welsh
- No. of episodes: 3

Production
- Producer: Adam Knopf
- Cinematography: Philipp Haberlandt
- Production company: Duck Soup Films

Original release
- Network: BBC One
- Release: 3 June – 17 June 2024

Lost Boys and Fairies is a 2024 three-part television drama created by Daf James. It is produced and distributed by the BBC and premiered on 3 June 2024.

== Plot ==
In Wales, Gabriel and Andy are a gay couple who have been together for eight years and are eager to adopt a child. They begin the process of adoption with the assistance of their social worker, Jackie. Andy is excited about the prospect of becoming a father, while his partner Gabriel, a drag queen, is hesitant, not only due to his past issues with drug addiction but also because of his unhappy childhood, which was marked by his mother's death and his father's homophobia. Although the couple initially wanted to adopt a girl, they meet and begin to grow fond of Jake, a child placed in foster care after being removed from his violent father.

== Cast and characters ==
- Siôn Daniel Young as Gabriel
- Fra Fee as Andy
- Leo Harris as Jake
- Elizabeth Berrington as Jackie
- Sharon D. Clarke as Claire
- Maria Doyle Kennedy as Sandra
- William Thomas as Emrys
- Arwel Gruffydd as Berwyn/Fanny Emple
- Shaheen Jafargholi as Celyn

== Production ==
The series was announced by the BBC in 2022. The show was also specified to be filmed and set in Wales in the same press release. It was produced by Leeds/Cardiff based production company Duck Soup Films.

== Reception ==
Lost Boys and Fairies opened to generally positive reviews. Rebecca Nicholson from The Guardian rated the show four out of five stars, praising its "huge heart and a clear eye on melodrama" and the show having "a lot of focus on language, and here, this is cerebral, emotional and genuinely fascinating". The series has also won the Seriencamp Official Competition Award. Amongst other awards, the show went on to win five Welsh Baftas and an International Emmy for Best mini-series.
