= Nina Toussaint-White =

English actress

- Born: England
- Occupation: Actress
- Years active: 2007–present

Nina Toussaint-White is a British actress, known for her roles as in the BBC soap opera EastEnders and in the ITV2 drama Switch.

== Career ==
In 2009, Toussaint-White was offered the part of nurse Syd Chambers, in the BBC soap opera EastEnders, making her first screen appearance in 2009. She played this character until her departure in October 2009. She has also appeared in Primeval, and acted in stage productions, including Race.

In 2012, she appeared as Mattie Grace in Holby City. In March 2012, it was announced that White would appear in the ITV2 supernatural drama Switch.

In 2015, Toussaint-White appeared as Tree in The Etienne Sisters at the Theatre Royal Stratford East. For this performance she was nominated for Best Performance in a Musical in the 2016 UK Theatre Awards alongside her co-cast members. In 2016, Toussaint-White appeared as Jane in the revival of The Libertine by Stephen Jeffreys at the Theatre Royal Bath. White portrayed DS Louise Rayburn. In 2021, Toussaint-White was cast in the action film Kandahar.

== Filmography ==
=== Film ===
Year	Title	Role	Notes
2011	The Missing Day		
2019	Ambition		Short film
2023	Kandahar	Luna Cujai	AKA: Mission Kandahar (Canadian title)
2024	The Primrose Railway Children	Sarah Robinson	
2025	Sleepover	Valerie	Short film

=== Television ===
Year	Title	Role	Notes
2007	Casualty	Bunmi	Episode: "Core Values"
2008	The Bill	Janice Pool	Episode: "Overkill"
2009	Primeval	Melanie	Episode: "Medical Mayhem"
2009	EastEnders	Syd Chambers	Recurring role (41 episodes)
2011	Doctor Who	Mels	Episode: "Let's Kill Hitler"
2011	Comedy Showcase	Beautician	Episode: "The Fun Police"
2012	Whitechapel	Tish Petersen	Episode 3.1
2012	Holby City	Matti Grace	Episode: "Fight the Good Fight"
2012	Scott & Bailey	Chantelle Deen	Episode: "Sidelines"
2012	Switch	Jude Thomas	Main role (6 episodes)
2014	Death in Paradise	Lena Bell	Episode: "Political Suicide"
2014	Doctors	Laverne Denton	Episode: "Not Waving"
2014	Holby City	Sophia Verlaine	Recurring role (6 episodes)
2014–2017	Uncle	Shelly	Recurring role (8 episodes)
2016	Emmerdale	Angie Bailey	Recurring role (15 episodes)
2017–2019	GameFace	Lucie	Main role (6 episodes)
2018	Bodyguard	DS Louise Rayburn	Main role (4 episodes)
2019	The Feed	Kate Hatfield	Main role (10 episodes)
2019	Midsomer Murders	Hannah Brookthorpe	Episode: "The Sting of Death"
2020	The Sister	DCI Jacki Hadley	Mini-series; 4 episodes
2022	Witness Number 3	Jodie Packer	4 episodes
2022	Mammals	Jane	3 episodes
2023	Shetland	Amma Calder	4 episodes
2024	Showtrial	Claudia Wood	5 episodes
2025	Murder Before Evensong	Jane Thwaite	2 episodes

== Awards and nominations ==
Year	Organisation	Category	Project	Result	Ref.
2025	Children's and Family Emmy Awards	Outstanding Lead Performer in a Preschool, Children's or Young Teen Program	The Primrose Railway Children	Nominated	
