= Ruaridh Mollica =

Scottish actor, writer and director (born 1999)

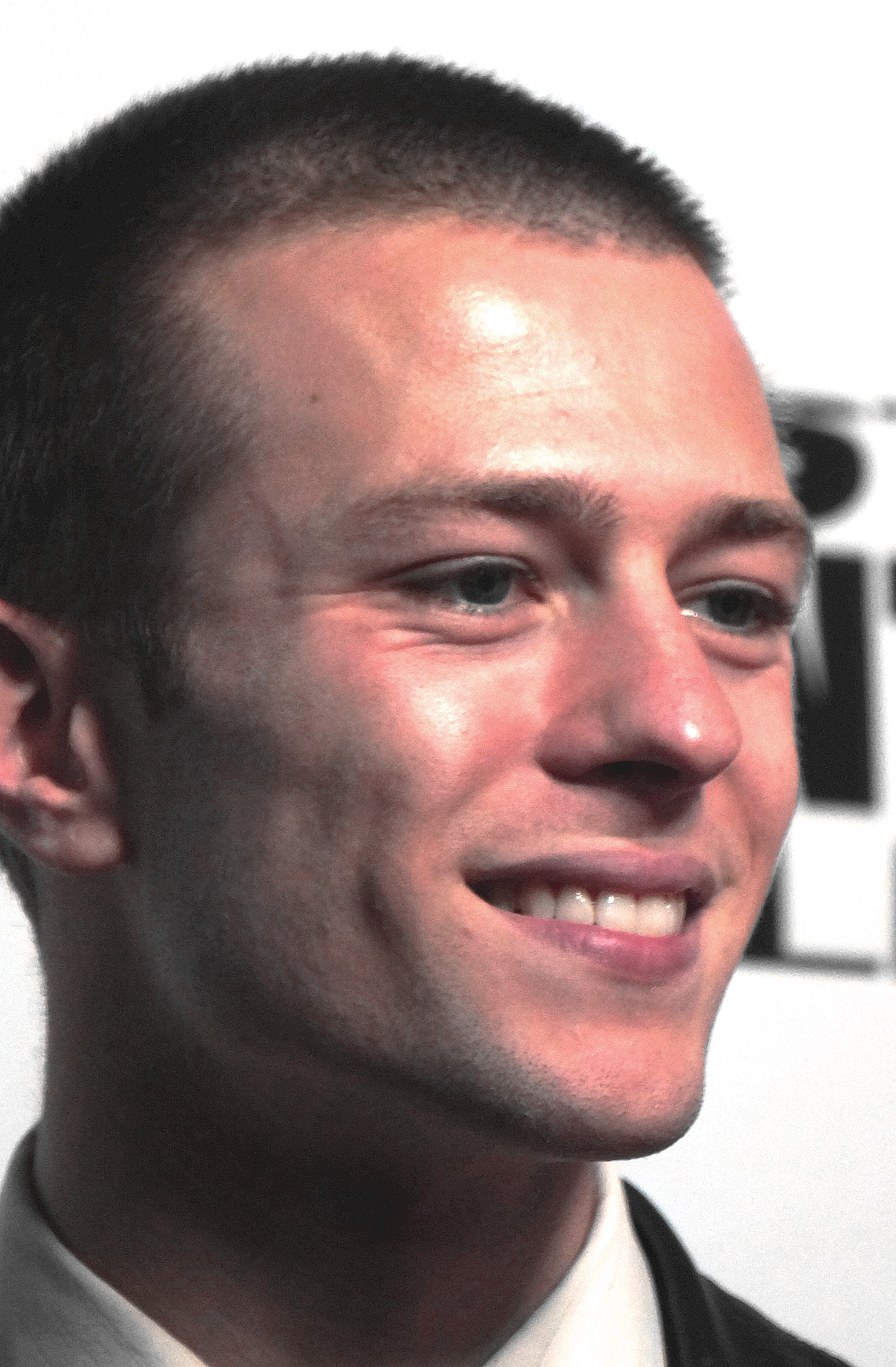
- Mollica in 2024
- Born: Ruaridh Silvio James MacGillivray-Mollica; 14 October 1999 (age 27); Prato, Italy
- Citizenship: United Kingdom; Italy
- Education: Heriot-Watt University
- Years active: 2013–present

Ruaridh Silvio James MacGillivray-Mollica (/rʊriː/; born 14 October 1999) is a Scottish actor, writer, and director. For his performance in the film Sebastian (2024) he was nominated for a British Independent Film Award. On television, he starred in the Disney+ series VisionQuest (2026). He also appeared in the Channel 5 series Witness Number 3 and the BBC Three series Red Rose (both in 2022).

Mollica was named one of Screen International's 2024 Rising Stars Scotland.

== Early life and education ==
Mollica was born in Prato, Italy, to a Scottish mother and an Italian father. Mollica attended Broughton High School in Edinburgh. He joined the Strange Town youth theatre company, where he met his agent Ruth Hollyman. Mollica graduated with a Bachelor of Science in computer science from Heriot-Watt University in 2021. During his time at university he participated in snowsports. He intended to do a master's degree in cybersecurity at a London university but declined the offer when he was cast in Red Rose.

== Career ==
Mollica began his career as a child actor, making his television debut aged 12 in an episode of the BBC One series Case Histories with Jason Isaacs and Mark Bonnar and his feature film debut as a background dancer in the Sunshine on Leith adaptation. He worked on-and-off for a number of years, appearing in the 2015 drama Stonemouth as a young version of Christian Cooke's character and the 2018 romance film Tell It to the Bees.

During his final year at university, Mollica returned to acting when his Strange Town agent Ruth Hollyman got him the lead role opposite Joshua Griffin in Sean Lionadh's 2022 short film Too Rough, which won a Scottish BAFTA. He then landed his first recurring television role as Patrick Hume in the BBC Three horror series Red Rose, which Mollica declined his postgraduate university place to film, and his first main role in the Channel 5 series Witness Number 3. He also appeared in Wasted at the Jack Studio Theatre.

In 2024, Mollica starred as the lead character Max Williamson in Mikko Mäkelä's second feature-film, Sebastian, which opened at the Sundance Film Festival. For his performance, Mollica was nominated for the British Independent Film Award for Breakthrough Performance. Mollica also played a young version of Stephen Moyer's character Teddy in the Paramount+ series Sexy Beast.

In 2025, he appeared in the film Sukkwan Island.

Mollica made his West End theatre debut alongside Joe Locke in Clarkston, a play by Samuel D. Hunter, from September to November 2025.

In October 2025, Mollica was added to the cast of Marvel's VisionQuest, playing Tommy Maximoff / Thomas Shepherd.

== Personal life ==
Mollica is queer. Regarding his sexuality, in a February 2024 interview with Queerty, Mollica said, "it was only when I moved to London and had the ability to be myself that I realised, 'Oh actually, no, I like men as well'". He explained in an interview with The Skinny in April 2025 that "The circles I moved in at school and uni were not really queer circles, so I only started to learn about queer culture as I was coming out in London." He said in his interview with Gay Times in February 2025, "I moved to London to also be more free and discover myself more. I wasn't completely out as queer in Edinburgh, and that was something that moving to London allowed me to be able to do, and fall into, and embrace. I went on my journey of becoming who I am and being openly queer alongside the film happening and the film coming out. It was actually really beautiful, and it couldn't have been more perfect."

== Filmography ==
=== Film ===
Key
†	Denotes films that have not yet been released

Year	Title	Role	Notes
2013	Sunshine on Leith	Dancer	
2018	Tell It to the Bees	Rose Attacker	
2022	Too Rough	Nick	Short film
2022	The Doomsday Clock	The Reader	Short film; director, writer
2023	Boys on Film: Dangerous to Know	Nick	
2024	Sebastian	Max Williamson	
2025	Sukkwan Island	Roy	
TBA	Isle of Man †	TBA	Filming
TBA	Bare †	TBA	Filming

=== Television ===
Key
†	Denotes television productions that have not yet been released

Year	Title	Role	Notes
2013	Victorian Villains	James Fleming	TV film
2013	Case Histories	Freddie Marshall	Episode: "Nobody's Darling"
2015	Stonemouth	Young Stewart	Part 1
2022	Witness Number 3	Po	4 episodes
2022	Red Rose	Patrick Hume	5 episodes
2024	Sexy Beast	Young Teddy Bass	1 episode
2024	The Jetty	Troy	2 episodes
2024	Ridley	Ryan Stanford	2 episodes
2024	The Franchise	Jaz Cox	5 episodes
2026	A Thousand Blows	Nicholas Grafton	2 episodes
2026	VisionQuest	Tommy Maximoff / Thomas Shepherd	8 episodes

=== Theatre ===
Year	Title	Role	Venue	Ref.
2025	Clarkston	Chris	Trafalgar Theatre, West End	

=== Music videos ===
- "Easter Road" (2020), Callum Beattie
