= The Electric, Birmingham =

Cinema in Birmingham, England

The Electric
- Select Cinema; Tatler News Theatre; The Jacey; The Classic; The Tivoli
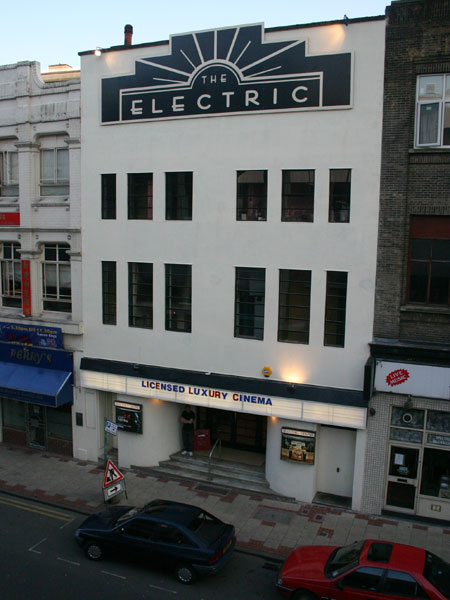
- The Electric in 2005
- Interactive map of The Electric
- Address: 47-49 Station Street; Birmingham; England
- Coordinates: 52.4766°N 1.8987°W
- Owner: Electric Cinemas Limited
- Current use: Cinema

Construction
- Opened: 1909
- Closed: 2024

Website
- www.theelectric.co.uk

The Electric is a cinema in Birmingham, England. It opened in Station Street in 1909, showing its first silent film on 27 December of that year. It was the first cinema in Birmingham, and was the oldest working cinema in the country until its closure on 29 February 2024. The Electric had two screens, both able to show digitally-shot films and one also able to show films in 35 mm.

Originally called the Electric Theatre, the cinema has undergone a number of name changes since its opening, but returned as The Electric in October 1993. It closed in December 2003 and was purchased by local film director and producer Tom Lawes, who initiated extensive renovations to the building in order to restore it to its 1930s Art Deco aesthetic. It reopened in December 2004. The cinema closed again at the start of the COVID-19 pandemic in 2020, with most of its staff being made redundant. In January 2022 the cinema reopened under new ownership.

As of February 2024, the cinema was closed again for the foreseeable future.

== History ==
=== 1900s ===
The Electric opened on the bank holiday of 27 December 1909 and was Birmingham's first film theatre. The architectural plans were designed by leading theatre architect of the time, Bertie Crewe (1860–1937) which are now a part of the Library of Birmingham's archives and collections.

Excerpts from newspapers at the time:

- "There has been a further addition to the number of places of amusement in Birmingham. Electric Theatre (1908), Ltd., of London has taken a commodious shop in Station-Street, right in the centre of the city, and the interior has been transformed into a cosy and attractive entertainment hall with a capacity of 376, in red plush tip-up seats. The machines here are also of the latest Edison type, and brilliantly steady pictures are shown at a throw of about 55 ft. The operating room is similarly equipped, and is one of the finest in the city."
- "The pictures displayed, some of which are in colours, are of an historical, dramatic, educational, as well as of a humorous character, and the entertainment is proving a decided attraction with young and old alike. Pictures showing this week are To Save Her Soul, Piedmont, The Shell, A Box of Chocolates, The Cabbage, Making Plate Glass, A Workman's Revenge, and That Skating Carnival, with a complete change on Thursday. Mr. George Putnam, is the energetic manager, and Mr. A. Hart chief man at the wheel."
- "It is estimated that upwards of two thousand persons paid for admission on the opening day, and from two o'clock until eleven there is a constant stream of fresh arrivals. Mr Putnam is arranging for a constant change of programme, and all the latest and most interesting pictures will be displayed from time to time."

Silent films were accompanied by piano music.

In 1910, the Electric Cinema in Notting Hill, London, opened, deriving its name from the Birmingham cinema.

=== 1920s and 1930s ===
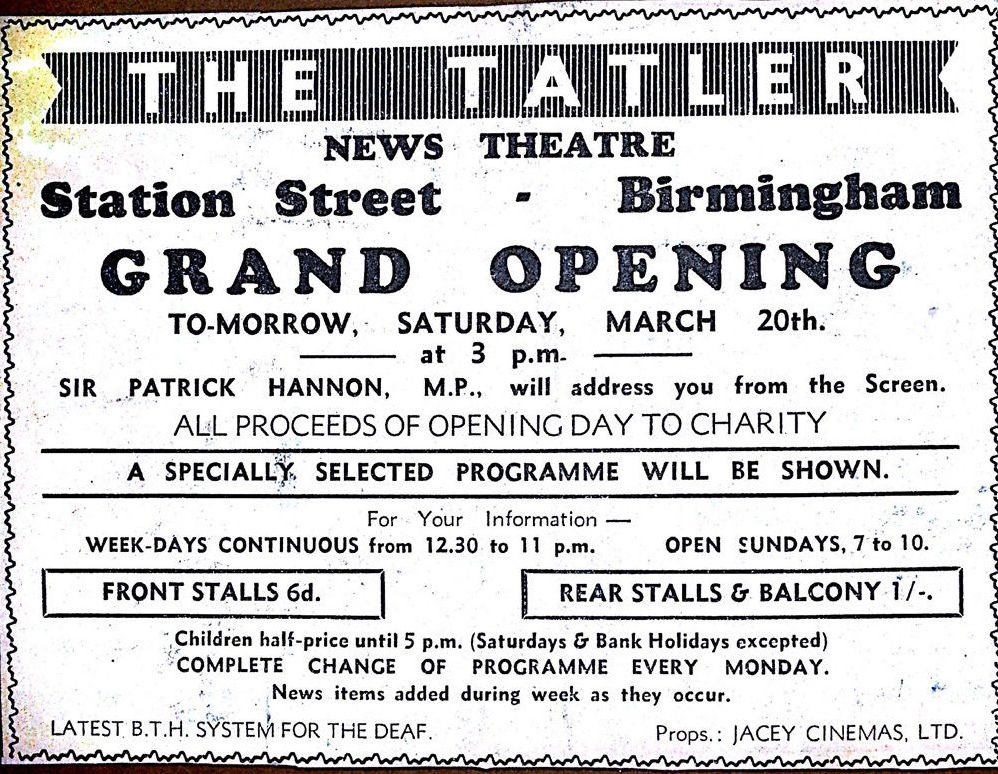
Opening notice for the Tatler Cinema, 19 March 1937

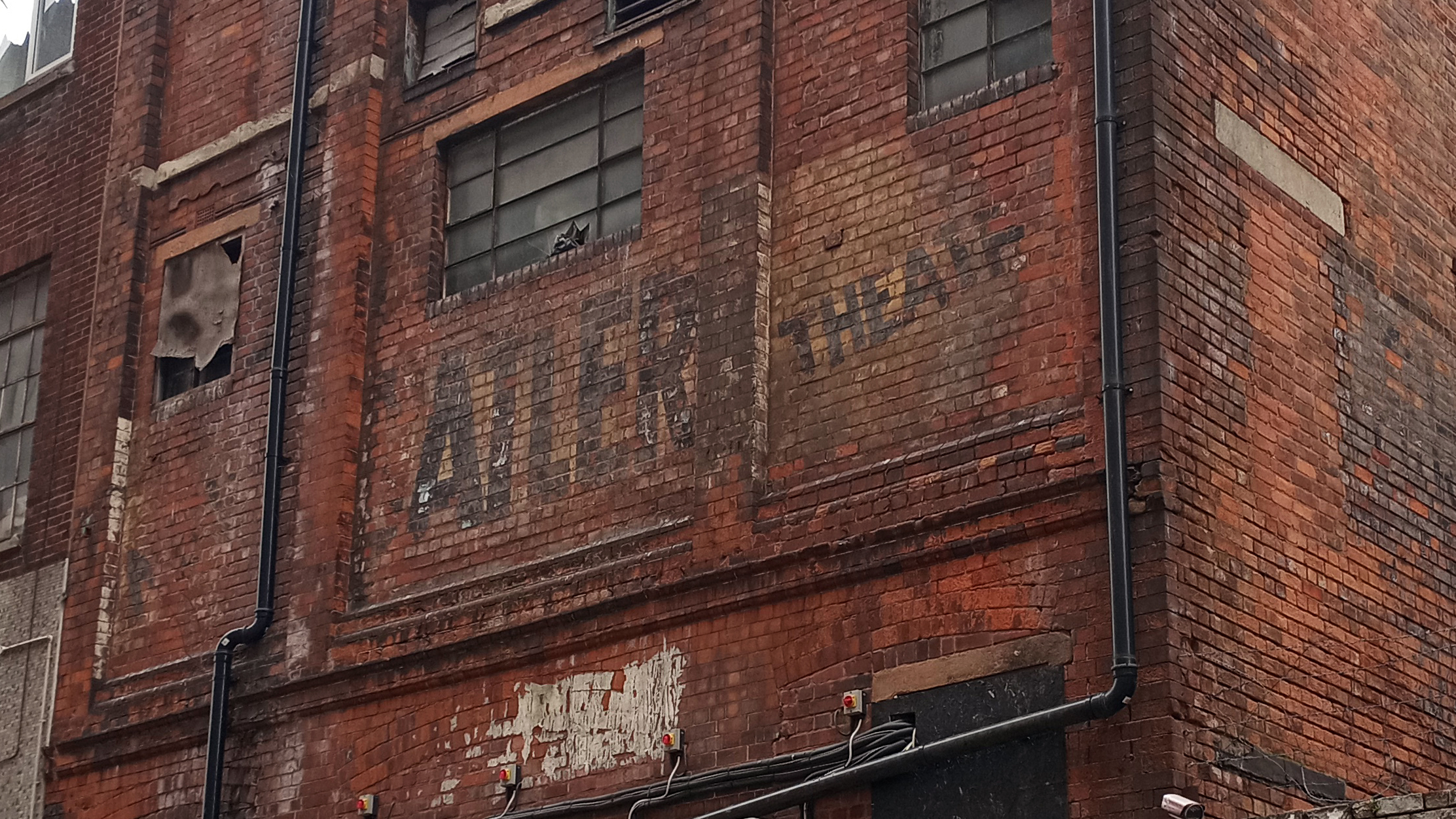
Faded text reading "Tatler Theatre" on the rear of the Electric in 2022

In the 1920s, the cinema was bought out and underwent the first of many name changes, becoming known as The Select showing a programme of silent movies.

In 1931 Joseph Cohen, a Birmingham entrepreneur, bought The Select and for a few months screened rep films, before closing the cinema in 1932 with a view to a complete refit. His plan was to obtain the uppers floors, then create a balcony and changing rooms for the staff. Architect Cecil E.M.Filmore was hired to help navigate these structural alternations and on 20 March 1937 the cinema reopened as The Tatler News Theatre, after being almost totally rebuilt. Rolling news reels from Pathé and British Movietone, along with short films and cartoons were presented.

=== 1950s to 1970s ===
After World War II, with television becoming increasingly popular, attendance at news theatres declined. In the 1950s, the cinema changed its focus and became The Jacey Cartoon Theatre (Jacey derived from Joseph Cohen's initials). This did not last for long and in the 1960s, it became the Jacey Film Theatre, mainly showing a programme of art house and continental pictures.

In the 1960s it started showing cartoons and then soft pornographic films. This continued through much of the 1970s.

=== 1980s revival and 1990s ===
The Electric in the 1990s, featuring the Thatcher's Children art installation by John Buckley in its windows

The early 1980s saw a revival, with the cinema taken over by Lord Grade's "Classic" chain and split into two screens. Many Art Deco features were destroyed when the second screen was added.

This incarnation did not last for long and in the mid-1980s it became the Tivoli, screening a mix of mainstream, arthouse, and exploitation films. In 1993 it was bought by Bill Heine and managed by Steven Metcalf. They also reverted it to being called The Electric.

A contemporary work of art called Thatcher's Children by artist John Buckley was installed in the windows on the front of the building, with the intent to shock and attract publicity to the opening of an art cinema in Birmingham.

=== 2000s ===
The Electric closed, however, on 12 December 2003. The cinema was put up for sale and was quickly purchased by local film director and producer Tom Lawes. After a £250,000 refit and renovation, the cinema reopened on 17 December 2004. The building was restored to its 1930s Art Deco look from photographs taken during that period.

In recognition of its centenary in December 2009, local MPs Tom Watson, Khalid Mahmood and Richard Burden raised a motion in the House of Commons stating that the House:

recognises the value of independent cinemas to the cultural and social life of local communities; celebrates the continued success of Britain's oldest working cinema, The Electric in Birmingham; notes that on 2 December 2009 a centenary celebration is taking place for the cinema that started life as a silent movie theatre, became a news theatre during the Second World War and succumbed to dereliction in 2003.

Josephine Ferguson became the first female projectionist to work at The Electric Cinema in 2010.

=== 2020s ===
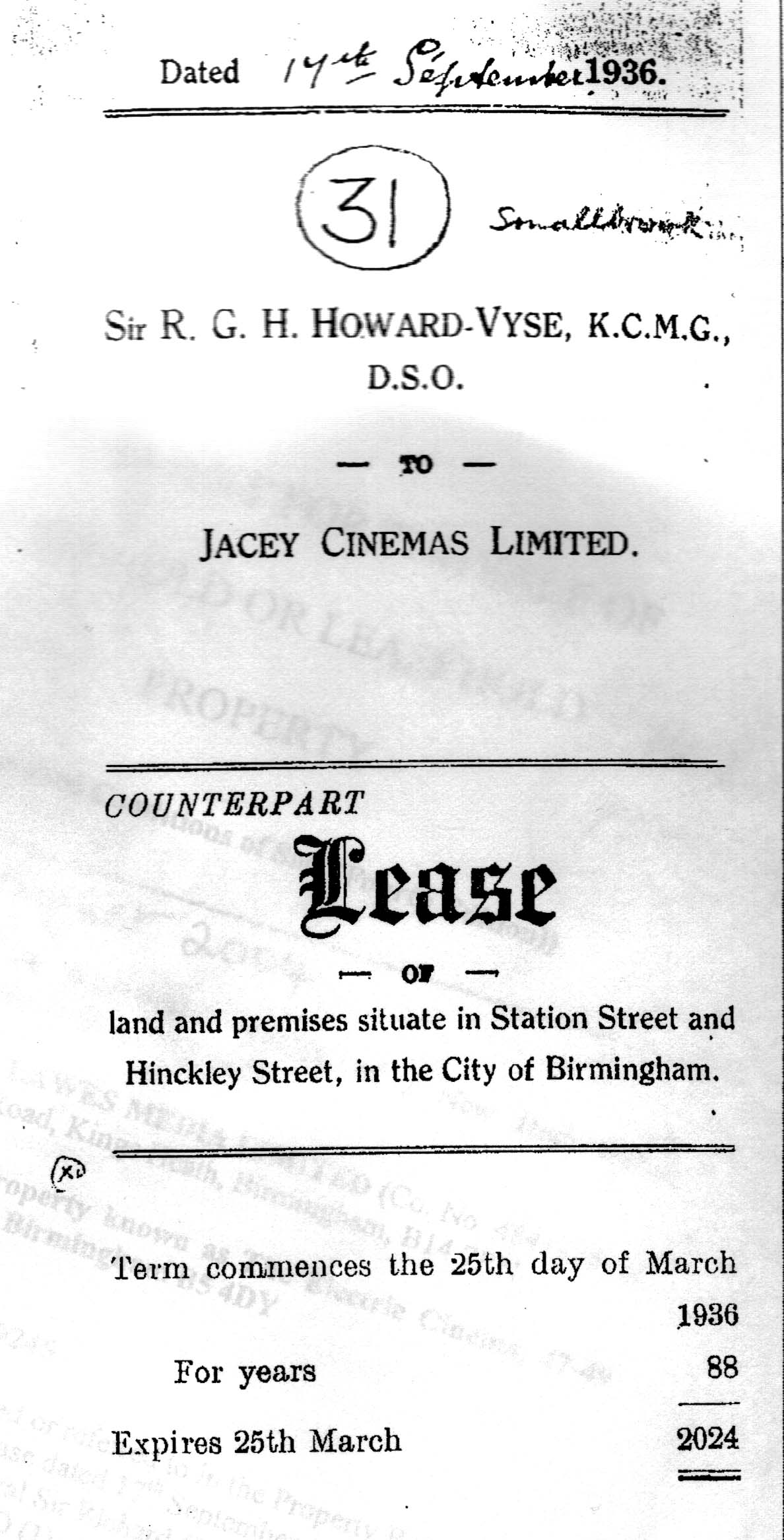
The Jacey Cinemas lease, dated 25 March 1936 – 25 March 2024

At the start of the COVID-19 pandemic in the United Kingdom, the cinema enacted a mass redundancy of its staff. Lawes informed the staff in March 2020 that most would be made redundant rather than furloughed, with just three employees put on to furlough. As of July 2021, the cinema's website stated: "The future of The Electric Cinema Birmingham faces an even bigger issue than that of Covid due to the impending end of its 88 year lease. As the freeholder has yet to make a decision about its plans for Station Street, we are not currently in a position to reopen the cinema. This uncertainty has also meant we have been unable to apply for the Cultural Recovery Fund or other financial support to assist us financially through the period of closure."

In November 2021, it was reported that the cinema would reopen under new ownership before Christmas, having been taken over by Kevin Markwick, who also runs the Picture House Cinema in Uckfield, East Sussex.

It reopened on 20 January 2022, after an estimated £100,000 had been spent on its refurbishment. It was managed by owner Kevin Markwick and his daughter Katie.

The cinema had two screens, both able to show digitally-shot films and one also able to show films in 35 mm.

On 29 February 2024, the cinema declared it was 'shutting for the foreseeable future'.
