= Witness Number 3 =

British television series

- Screenplay by: Thomas Eccleshare
- Directed by: Diarmuid Goggins
- Starring: Nina Toussaint-White; Sion Daniel Young; Sue Johnston
- Country of origin: United Kimgdom
- Original language: English
- No. of series: 1
- No. of episodes: 4

Production
- Executive producers: David Nath; David Collins
- Producer: Alex Jones
- Production company: Story Films

Original release
- Network: Channel 5
- Release: 18 July – 21 July 2022

Witness Number 3 is a 2022 British mystery thriller television series. Directed by Diarmuid Goggins, it was written by Thomas Eccleshare. The cast is led by Nina Toussaint-White and Sion Daniel Young. It was broadcast on Channel 5 in July 2022.

== Premise ==
A single mother is pursued by a gang after witnessing a crime and giving evidence.

== Cast ==
- Nina Toussaint-White as Jodie
- Sion Daniel Young as PC Ivan Barkas
- Sue Johnston as Cathy
- Cole Martin as Kyle
- Clare Dunne as Detective Whelan
- Ruaridh Mollica as Po

== Production ==
The four-part series was written by Thomas Eccleshare and directed by Diarmuid Goggins. The series was commissioned by Channel 5 in November 2021. It is produced by Story Films with Alex Jones as producer with David Nath and David Collins as executive producers.

The cast is led by Nina Toussaint-White and also includes Sue Johnston and Sion Daniel Young as well as Cole Martin, Clare Dunne and Ruaridh Mollica.

Although set in London, the series was filmed in Ireland.

== Broadcast ==
The series premiered in the United Kingdom on 18 July 2022 on Channel 5. The following year the series became available to stream on Netflix.

== Reception ==
Anita Singh in The Daily Telegraph said that for a low-budget drama it "punches above its weight". Carol Midgely in The Times described it as a "grimly absorbing drama…extremely well told".
