= Animals (2019 film) =

2019 film

- UK theatrical release poster
- Directed by: Sophie Hyde
- Written by: Emma Jane Unsworth
- Based on: Animals by Emma Jane Unsworth
- Produced by: Sarah Brocklehurst; Cormac Fox; Sophie Hyde; Rebecca Summerton
- Starring: Holliday Grainger; Alia Shawkat
- Cinematography: Bryan Mason
- Edited by: Bryan Mason
- Music by: Zoë Barry; Jed Palmer
- Production companies: Closer Productions; Sarah Brocklehurst Productions; Vico Films; Cornerstone Films
- Distributed by: Bonsai Films (Australia)
- Release date: 28 January 2019 (Sundance)
- Running time: 109 minutes
- Countries: Australia; Ireland
- Language: English

Animals is a 2019 comedy-drama film directed by Sophie Hyde, starring Holliday Grainger and Alia Shawkat. It was screened in the Premieres category at the 2019 Sundance Film Festival. An adaptation of Emma Jane Unsworth's 2014 novel of the same name, the film follows best friends Laura and Tyler whose lifestyle comes under scrutiny just as Laura becomes engaged to a teetotaller.

== Plot ==
Best friends Laura, a struggling writer working as a barista, and her best friend and flatmate Tyler, an American woman who is estranged from her family, are both heavy partiers living in Dublin. The early part of the film shows their close friendship in their late twenties as they consume large quantities of wine and drugs through the night, sometimes engaging in casual sex with a man but mostly just enjoying each other's company.

Tyler is included in Laura's family gatherings, with a pregnant sister (who becomes mother to a baby daughter) playing a part in the plot and character development.

Circumstances change when Laura meets and then gets engaged to concert pianist Jim, who shortly afterwards gives up alcohol. Laura continues her partying lifestyle with Tyler, but starts spending nights with Jim.

Inevitably the dynamics of the various relationships change, and more so after they become friends with a poet, Marty, to whom Laura is attracted, and his circle of literary friends. Laura struggles to make progress with her novel throughout the film.

Various events in each of their lives unfold, with questions about life, and especially women's roles, raised and explored both implicitly and explicitly. With the development of the women's friendship front and centre of the film, it does not take the route of a typical neat and happily resolved "Hollywood ending", but ends optimistically with Laura finding her creativity beginning to flow as she finds a way forward.

== Cast ==
- Holliday Grainger as Laura
- Alia Shawkat as Tyler
- Fra Fee as Jim
- Jamael Westman as Leo
- Dermot Murphy as Marty
- Amy Molloy as Jean
- Kwaku Fortune as Julian
- Olwen Fouéré as Maureen
- Pat Shortt as Bill
- Ryan Lincoln as Barman

== Production ==
Director Sophie Hyde said that it was the book which drew her in and inspired her to make the film, giving voice to women's experiences in a way that she had not seen very often on screen and in a way that felt connected to her own experience. She and Unsworth worked collaboratively from early in the creative process. The film was made in and around Dublin, whereas the book is set in Manchester.

Shawkat said she was drawn to the film owing to its being driven by women, and she was able to bring her life experience into her creation of the character. Both main actors agreed that the personal chemistry between the two worked well on set because they had hit it off in real life.

The film was produced by Rebecca Summerton, Sarah Brocklehurst, Cormac Fox, and Sophie Hyde. Music was by Zoë Barry and Jed Palmer.

== Release ==
After premiering at the Sundance Film Festival in early 2019, where it was well received, the film had its Australian premiere at a "pop-up" event at the Adelaide Film Festival on 5–6 April 2019.

It screened at the Sundance London in June 2019 and opened in UK cinemas in August, attracting good reviews. It was released in Australia on 12 September 2019.

== Reception ==
On the review aggregator website Rotten Tomatoes, 88% of 65 critics' reviews are positive. The website's consensus reads: "Elevated by the chemistry and bold performances of its leads, Animals takes a refreshingly frank and impressively ambitious look at female relationships." On Metacritic, the film has a weighted average score of 65 out of 100 based on 7 critics, which the site labels as "generally favorable" reviews.

Sundance said "Shawkat’s live-wire performance gives Tyler an anarchic comic edge that perfectly complements Grainger’s soulful turn as the conflicted and creatively blocked Laura".

The Adelaide Review called it "a visually stunning and often surprising film".

IndieWire’s Kate Erbland said that Grainger and Shawkat are wonderful together, and that the film "revels in the messiness of life, and the many love stories it can contain”. Variety's Guy Lodge hailed the comedy as a commercial leap forward and wrote of its "ideally matched stars" and said that it compared favourably with the "more superficially subversive female leads of comedies like Trainwreck". The Hollywood Reporter’s Leslie Felperin found Unsworth’s script "insightful in its treatment of the complexity of female friendships".

C.J. Johnson, of the Film Critics Circle of Australia, called the film "Significantly hipper, more thoughtful and more nuanced than your typical RomCom, while being significantly tamer, more formulaic and more commercially-minded than her previous film 52 Tuesdays".

In the UK, The Guardian's Benjamin Lee called the film "one that attendees should be breathlessly, excitedly discussing around town, urging everyone else to see immediately", and Time Out said it "should delight anyone who watches it".

== Awards and nominations ==
- 2019: Nomination, Best Actress, in the British Independent Film Awards (Holliday Grainger)
- 2019: Winner, British Independent Film Award for Best Debut Screenwriter (Emma Jane Unsworth)
- 2019: Nomination, Best Actress, in the Film Critics Circle of Australia Award (Alia Shawkat)
- 2019: Nomination, Best Director, in the ADG Awards (Sophie Hyde)
- 2019: Nomination, Best Feature Film Production, in the Screen Producers Australia Awards
