= Switch (British TV series) =

British supernatural comedy-drama television series

- Genre: Urban fantasy
- Created by: Touchpaper Television
- Written by: Chloe Moss; Tim Price
- Directed by: Dominic Leclerc; Tom Marshall
- Starring: Lacey Turner; Phoebe Fox; Hannah Tointon; Nina Toussaint-White
- Opening theme: "Lions in Cages" by Wolf Gang
- Composer: Richard Wells
- Country of origin: United Kingdom
- No. of series: 1
- No. of episodes: 6

Production
- Producer: Philip Trethowan
- Cinematography: Nick Dance
- Editor: Daniel Greenway
- Production company: Touchpaper Television

Original release
- Network: ITV2
- Release: 15 October – 19 November 2012

Switch is a British supernatural comedy-drama centring a quartet of witches known as "The Witches of Camden" who try to make their way in London. Created by Touchpaper Television for ITV2, the show stars Lacey Turner, Nina Toussaint-White, Hannah Tointon and Phoebe Fox. Its six-episode run began on 15 October 2012 at 10pm.

== Plot ==
Switch is an upbeat comedy drama about four young witches trying to make their way in the big city where they live in Camden, North London. They want to live a modern life, not one based on their mother's old-fashioned rituals. But modern life presents serious problems, and the girls cannot help casting the occasional spell to try to sort things out.

== Cast ==
The main cast are made up of four fun loving flatmates in Camden, North London. Each of the witches represents an element that handily provides a summarisation of their character.

=== Main ===
The main cast from left: Stella, Jude, Grace and Hannah.

- Stella Munroe (Lacey Turner) is a business savvy careerist, she's the mum of the bunch. Always immaculately dressed, Stella's the grown-up who goes out to work and pays all the bills, but her willingness to please can often see her getting into tricky situations. But despite the odd panic whenever things get out of control, it's Stella who's there to look after the other girls (and tidy the flat after them). Stella represents the element, Earth.
- Jude Thomas (Nina Toussaint-White) is a 'bolshie' wannabe fashion designer and is the fiery one of the group. Jude is incredibly driven and when she sees something she wants she is going to get it, no matter the cost. With an eye for the boys and a finger on the pulse of the party scene, stylish and sexy Jude is never far away from having a good time. Jude represents the element, Fire.
- Grace Watkins (Phoebe Fox) is the baby of the quartet, who is still adjusting to life in the Big City, but as the most traditional of the witches she should not be underestimated. With a strong moral sense of what is right and wrong, it is often down to Grace to pull the rest of the girls back from the brink when they are teetering on the edge of disaster. Grace represents the element, Water.
- Hannah Bright (Hannah Tointon) is the traveller of the group, and her flighty nature has taken her all over the world. Although devoted to the girls wherever she is, Hannah is often just passing through without much thought to what she is doing. More than a bit restless and a massive fear of commitment, she just goes wherever the wind may take her. Hannah represents the element, Air.

=== Recurring ===
- Lucy (Rosamund Hanson) is Stella's nightmare ex-girlfriend.
- Gloria Watkins (Caroline Quentin) is Grace's mother.
- Janet Boot (Amanda Drew) is Stella's boss.
- Aaron (Reece Noi) is Jude's work pal.
- Gerry (Jamie Davis) is Jude's boyfriend/Grace's love interest.
- Alexa (Fiona Hampton) is the leader of Witches of Kensington.
- India (Sophie Colquhoun) is the former water element member of the Witches of Kensington.
- Remy (Katharine Bennett-Fox) is one of the Witches of Kensington.
- Romola (Harriet Ballard) is one of the Witches of Kensington.

=== Star signs ===
On a card given by Stella to Hannah in the first episode, the girl's birthdays are as follows:

- Grace – 1 February (Aquarius)
- Stella – 23 April (Taurus)
- Jude – 27 July (Leo)
- Hannah – 26 September (Libra)

== Episode list ==
No. overall	No. in season	Title	Directed by	Written by	Original release date	UK viewers (millions)
1	1	"Witches of Camden"	Dominic Leclerc	Chloe Moss & Tim Price	15 October 2012	879,000
Stella (Lacey Turner) is in deep trouble. Summoning the girls home with a "Switch" text, she is desperate to cast a spell to save her skin. Hannah (Hannah Tointon) flies home from India, Jude (Nina Toussaint-White) abandons customers in work while Grace’s (Phoebe Fox) romantic encounter is interrupted. With chaos under control and buoyed by initial success, Stella is confident enough to stand up to her boss, Janet (Amanda Drew). She gets sacked. The Witches of Camden cast another spell, but rusty after months of being apart, it results in a magical race against time to undo their own mistakes. When Grace’s mum, Gloria (Caroline Quentin), turns up out of the blue Grace is forced to cut the apron strings or be a mummy’s girl forever. Meanwhile commitment avoiding Hannah must choose between life on the road or life with her coven.
2	2	"Hexed"	Dominic Leclerc	Chloe Moss & Tim Price	22 October 2012	710,000
The Witches of Camden have been hexed. Confronting their arch-nemeses, the posh Witches of Kensington, is not easy but a few champagne cocktails later the two covens seem the best of friends. However, when Hannah (Hannah Tointon) tries to get a job at Stella’s (Lacey Turner) workplace it seems that bygones are far from bygones. Grace (Phoebe Fox) needs some help getting ready for her date with Joel (James Rastall) – but will he give her that magic feeling? Jude’s (Nina Toussaint-White) wishes for a new boss are answered when Gerry (Jamie Davis) turns up – but is he too hedonistic even for Jude? When the girls try to get retribution on the Witches of Kensington there are disastrous consequences to their actions.
3	3	"Love Is in the Air"	Dominic Leclerc	Chloe Moss & Tim Price	29 October 2012	TBA
Stella (Lacey Turner) hasn’t had a date in years. In fact, she hasn't fancied anyone in years. The girls are forced to confess that they cast a spell years ago to help her forget an ex-girlfriend. But not getting over Lucy (Rosamund Hanson) has stopped Stella from moving on. Stella must be re-introduced to nightmarish Lucy and find peace with their past relationship. Unfortunately, Stella falls in love with Lucy again. The girls must watch as the destructive relationship threatens to destroy not only everything Stella has worked so hard for, but also their precious coven. Meanwhile, Hannah (Hannah Tointon) gets into a spot of bother with a new career choice, Jude (Nina Toussaint-White) encounters problems when she takes a short cut to the top of her career ladder, and is Grace (Phoebe Fox) in love with Jude’s boyfriend?
4	4	"The Anniversary"	Tom Marshall	Chloe Moss & Tim Price	5 November 2012	697,000
The girls’ coven of anniversary is approaching, and preparations for celebrations are in place. But when Grace (Phoebe Fox) gets mugged, she wants to leave London for good. The girls do the only thing they think will help – they cast a confidence spell to help Grace cope with city life. Stella (Lacey Turner), meanwhile, has problems of her own when India, one of their nemeses from the Witches of Kensington, turns up to work at the PR Agency. Intent on destroying Stella’s career and the company with it, India casts a charm on the whole office. Hannah (Hannah Tointon) enjoys being market holder on a stall of Jude’s (Nina Toussaint-White) designs, until all the stock is stolen. All in all, things do not look good for a happy celebration. But there are darker forces at work and things soon get out of hand.
5	5	"Help!"	Tom Marshall	Chloe Moss & Tim Price	12 November 2012	665,000
Grace (Phoebe Fox) and Gerry’s (Jamie Davis) relationship seems to be blooming nicely. Having just split up with Gerry herself, Jude (Nina Toussaint-White) is feeling weird about this. When she calls Mike (Kevin Bishop) over, she’s looking for some no-strings comfort sex, but she gains so much more. Hannah (Hannah Tointon) takes up tutoring with a little magical twist and gains 15-year-old Earth element Tuppence (Lilly Lucia Ainsworth) – a privileged, precocious and pretty lonely pupil. Grace’s anxiety levels reach fever pitch when she becomes convinced that Gerry does not like her as much as she likes him. Stella (Lacey Turner) is set on finding her one true love through efficient means. When things inevitably go disastrously wrong, it is time to reach for that spell book!
6	6	"Summer Solstice Showdown"	Tom Marshall	Chloe Moss & Tim Price	19 November 2012	TBA
It’s the Summer Solstice and the girls go to Grace (Phoebe Fox) and Hannah’s (Hannah Tointon) hometown of Lower Sooth to celebrate. Hannah is disappointed when her mum, Esme (Imogen Stubbs) is nowhere to be found, Grace is shocked when Gerry (Jamie Davis) turns up despite them casting a spell. Jude (Nina Toussaint-White) is looking forward to a bit of excitement in the forest with her first love, Jack (Howard Charles). But these are the least of their concerns when the Witches of Kensington arrive – with Alexa’s mother, Karina (Diana Kent) in tow. This super-coven is set on bringing down the witches of Camden. Before the longest day of the year is out, there is a scandalous showdown to survive and some shocking home truths to be shared.

== Production ==
The six-part first series began filming in April 2012 for 11 weeks in London, Cardiff and Bristol, and concluded in July. It was announced on Lacey Turner's official Twitter support page 'Lacey Turner Fans' that it would not continue for a second series.

== Reception ==
=== Critical reception ===
Louisa Mellor of Den of Geek wrote a mixed review; "Though it's frothier than Being Human and nowhere as near the knuckle as Misfits, its original UK genre TV and as such, we welcome it with open arms." She also named Fox and Turner as the stand-outs of the series.

=== Ratings ===
The series premier which was watched by 574,000 viewers and 62,000 an hour later, performed well above the slot average of 440,000 (2.4%) for the past 12 months and was also the most-watched show on the channel across the day.
