= Woody Norman =

English actor (born c. 2009)

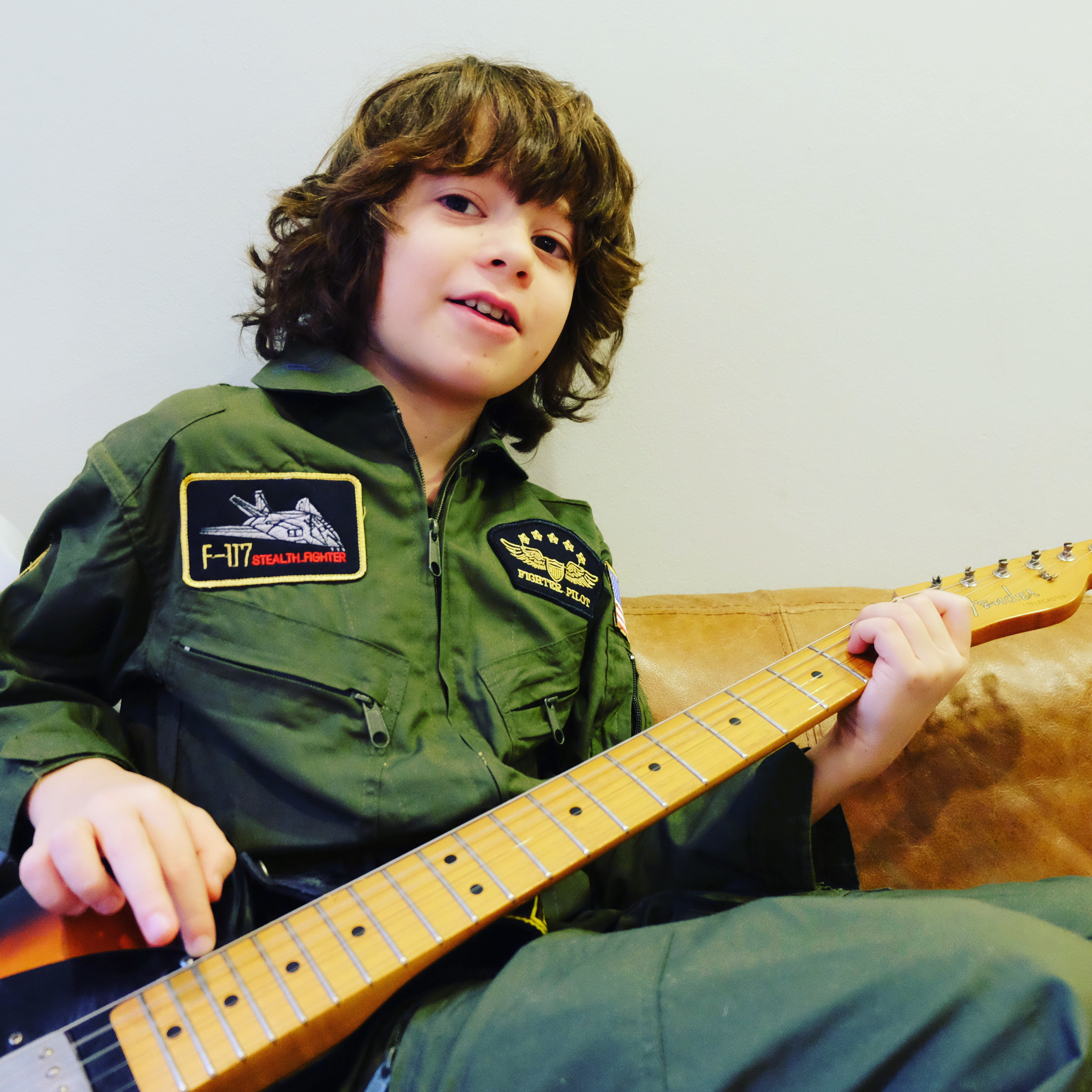
- Norman in 2019
- Born: Woody Ace Norman; 2009 (age 16–17); Hampstead, London, England
- Occupation: Actor
- Years active: 2015–present

Woody Ace Norman (born c. 2009) is an English child actor. He is best known for his role as Jesse in the film C'mon C'mon (2021), for which he received a BAFTA nomination for Best Supporting Actor. He appeared on the Evening Standard list of Londoners to watch in 2022.

On television, he appeared in the Starz adaptation of The White Princess (2017), the BBC and Netflix miniseries Troy: Fall of a City (2018), and series 5 of Poldark (2019).

== Early life ==
Born in Hampstead, Norman is from North London. He is the son of Ross Norman, and former girl group Madasun member Vonda Barnes.

== Career ==
Norman gained praise and attention for his performance as Richard II in the 2026 film The Uprising.

== Filmography ==
Key
†	Denotes films that have not yet been released

=== Film ===
Year	Title	Role	Notes
2017	The Current War	Thomas Alva "Dash" Edison Jr.	Director's cut only
2021	C'mon C'mon	Jesse	
2023	Cobweb	Peter	
2023	The Last Voyage of the Demeter	Toby Elliot	
2024	The Spaceman	Danny	Short film
2025	Sukkwan Island	Roy Fenn	
2025	The Electric State	Christopher "Chris" Greene	
2026	The Uprising	Richard II of England	

=== Television ===
Year	Title	Role	Notes
2015	Silent Witness	Laurie	Episode: "Falling Angels: Part 2"
2015	Peter and Wendy	Curly / Rory	Television film
2016	Him	Young Him	Miniseries; 2 episodes
2017	The White Princess	Prince Harry	Miniseries; 4 episodes
2018	Troy: Fall of a City	Evander	Miniseries
2018	Les Misérables	Young Marius	1 episode
2019	Catastrophe	Sam	1 episode
2019	Poldark	Valentine Warleggan	Series 5
2019	The War of the Worlds	George Junior	Miniseries

== Awards and nominations ==
Year	Award	Category	Work	Result	Ref
2021	Detroit Film Critics Society	Breakthrough Performance	C'mon C'mon	Nominated	
2021	Heartland Film Festival	Rising Star	C'mon C'mon	Won	
2021	Indiana Film Journalists Association	Best Supporting Actor	C'mon C'mon	Nominated	
2021	Indiana Film Journalists Association	Breakout of the Year	C'mon C'mon	Nominated	
2021	Las Vegas Film Critics Society	Youth in Film - Male	C'mon C'mon	Nominated	
2021	Online Association of Female Film Critics	Breakthrough Performance	C'mon C'mon	Nominated	
2021	Washington D.C. Area Film Critics Association	Best Youth Performance	C'mon C'mon	Won	
2022	British Academy Film Awards	Best Actor in a Supporting Role	C'mon C'mon	Nominated	
2022	Critics' Choice Movie Awards	Best Young Actor/Actress	C'mon C'mon	Nominated	
2022	International Film Society Critics	Best Youth Performance	C'mon C'mon	Runner-up	
2022	London Film Critics Circle Awards	Young British/Irish Performer	C'mon C'mon	Won	
2022	Music City Film Critics Association	Best Young Actor	C'mon C'mon	Nominated	
2022	North Carolina Film Critics Association	Best Supporting Actor	C'mon C'mon	Nominated	
2022	North Carolina Film Critics Association	Best Breakthrough Performance	C'mon C'mon	Nominated	
2022	Online Film & Television Association	Best Youth Performance	C'mon C'mon	Runner-up	
2022	Seattle Film Critics Society	Best Youth Performance	C'mon C'mon	Nominated	
