= Tom Lawes =

English film director

Thomas Lawes
- Born: 1 August 1971 (age 54); Birmingham, England
- Occupations: Film director; producer; composer
- Years active: 1993–present
- Known for: Owner and renovator of The Electric

Thomas Lawes (born 1 August 1971) is an English film director, music composer, and entrepreneur. He is best known for renovating and owning The Electric cinema in Birmingham, England, the oldest known working cinema in the United Kingdom. Lawes composed the soundtrack for the BBC television series All Quiet on the Preston Front (1994–1997), co-directed the 1998 film Demagogue, and directed the 2011 documentary film The Last Projectionist.

== Career ==
Lawes was born in Birmingham, England, and attended Handsworth Grammar School. At age 19, after working as a roadie for the rock band Gunfire Dance, Lawes began creating low-budget horror films shot on camcorder. In 1993, aged 22, he was hired by the BBC to compose the soundtrack to the BBC comedy drama television series All Quiet on the Preston Front. Lawes made his feature film directorial debut with the 1998 film Demagogue, which he co-directed with Adam Trotman.

In 2004 Lawes purchased the then-derelict Electric cinema in Birmingham, the oldest known working cinema in the country. Lawes then initiated a total renovation of the building, restoring it to its 1930s Art Deco aesthetic. Following the £250,000 renovations, the cinema, which had closed in December 2003, re-opened for business in December 2004.

Lawes is also the musical director of The Electric Cinema Film Orchestra, the UK's first in-house film orchestra.

In 2009, the centenary year of the original opening of The Electric, Lawes was congratulated in the House of Commons for his work in restoring the cinema. In 2011 Lawes directed and produced the feature-length documentary The Last Projectionist, a film charting the history of independent cinema in the UK. The film was named BBC Radio 5 Live's Film of the Week by Mark Kermode. The film won awards, including "Best Documentary" at the Cambridge Film Festival. In 2010 the British Film Institute selected The Last Projectionist to be included in its permanent archive collection. Lawes also directed a series of short documentaries Southside Stories which in 2012 won two Royal Television Society (Midlands) Award for Best Promotional Programme and Best Craft.

== Filmography ==
Year	Film	Director	Producer	Composer	Editor	Notes	Ref(s)
1994	Rhino Bitch	Co-director	Co-producer	Yes		Short film; also actor and post-production sound	
1998	Demagogue	Co-director		Yes			
2003	The Living Love the Dead!					Video documentary; appears as self	
2011	The Last Projectionist	Yes	Yes	Yes	Yes	Also cinematographer and sound mixer	
2014	3 Sides of the Coin	Yes		Yes	Yes	Short film; also cinematographer	
2016	Monochrome	Yes	Yes	Yes	Yes	Also screenwriter and cinematographer	

== Awards ==
- 1998 Festival of Fantastic Films, Best Independent Feature Film Demagogue
- 2005 O2/Arena Magazine UK Entrepreneur of the Year (Regional Winner and National Finalist)
- 2008 Creative Business Awards, Outstanding Business Development
- 2009 Birmingham Power 50
- 2011 ITN Distribution Film Festival New York, Best Documentary The Last Projectionist
- 2011 Take One Awards, Best Documentary The Last Projectionist
- 2012 Royal Television Society (Midlands), Best Production Craft Skills
- 2012 Royal Television Society (Midlands), Best Promotional Programme Southside Stories

== Other work ==
- Southside Business Improvement District - Board Director
- Shock and Gore Film Festival - Chair
- BBC WM - Film Critic
