= Siôn Daniel Young =

Welsh actor

- Born: 1989 or 1990 (age 36–37); Cardiff, Wales
- Education: Royal Conservatoire of Scotland
- Occupation: Actor
- Years active: 2010–present
- Television: Lost Boys and Fairies

Sion Daniel Young (born in 1989) is a Welsh stage, television and film actor.

== Early life and education ==
Siôn Daniel Young was born in Cardiff, Wales.

He trained as an actor at the Royal Scottish Academy of Music & Drama, now known as the Royal Conservatoire of Scotland.

== Career ==
=== Stage ===
Young's first professional role was appearing in Daf James play Llwyth (Tribe), which was the first play about gay characters written by a queer person on a Welsh-language stage.

He played the role of Albert Narracott in War Horse at the Royal National Theatre, London in 2013.

In 2015, he had the lead role of Christopher Boone in the stage play adaptation of The Curious Incident of the Dog in the Night-Time at the Gielgud Theatre in London.

In 2017, he played Davey in Gary Owen’s Olivier award winning play ‘Killology’ at The Royal Court Theatre.

In 2018, he led the world premiere production of Barney Norris’s play Nightfall at the Bridge Theatre, London, alongside Claire Skinner and Ophelia Lovibond.

In 2019, Sion performed in Ben Weatherill’s play‘Jellyfish’ at the National Theatre.

He then returned to the Royal Court theatre in London to perform in Ed Thomas’ ‘On Bear Ridge’ alongside Rhys Ifans.

=== Film and television ===
Young appeared in the 2012 war film Private Peaceful. In 2014, he appeared in World War One-centenary series Our World War

He had the lead role in 2019 television drama film The Left Behind. For the role he was nominated for Best Actor at the 2020 BAFTA Cymru Awards. The film won BAFTA and Royal Television Society awards for Best Single Drama.

In 2021, he played Colin Stagg in Channel 4 miniseries Deceit. A true story based on a man wrongly accused of murder in 1992, described as one of the gravest miscarriages of justice in British legal history. Sion was nominated for Best Actor at the 2022 BAFTA Cymru awards for his performance.

In series three of Apple TV+ espionage thriller Slow Horses, he played Douglas, an MI5 records keeper. For this, Sion received his third Best Actor BAFTA Cymru nomination in 2024.

He also appeared in Channel 5 crime thriller Witness Number 3.

In 2024, Sion played the lead role of Gabriel in BBC One drama Lost Boys and Fairies. Written by Daf James, it was BBC One’s first primetime gay adoption drama. For his role in the series he won Best Actor at the BAFTA Cymru Awards in 2025.

The show also won ‘Best Mini Series’ at the 2025 International Emmy’s.

That year, Sion could be seen in Cardiff-set BBC One series The Guest alongside Gabrielle Creevy.

== Personal life ==
He is a first-language Welsh speaker.

== Filmography ==
=== Film ===
Year	Title	Role	Notes
2012	Private Peaceful	Pete Bovey	
2013	Another Me	Joe, The Hooded Youth	
2014	National Theatre Live: War Horse	Albert Narracott	Live broadcast from Season 5
2017	Stump	Danny	Short film

=== Television ===
Year	Title	Role	Notes
2012	Casualty	Isaac Flack	Series 26; episode 36: "Teenage Dreams"
2014	Our World War	Sapper Neary	Mini-series; episode 1: "The First Day"
2015	Hinterland	Morgan Hopkins	Series 2; episode 1: "Ceredigion"
2019	The Left Behind	Gethin	Television film
2019	Doc Martin	George Pendrick	Series 9; episode 4: "Paint It Black"
2020–2021	Keeping Faith	Gareth	Series 3; episodes 1–5
2021	Deceit	Colin Stagg	Mini-series; episodes 1–4
2022	Life and Death in the Warehouse	Sean	Television film
2022	Witness Number 3	PC Ivan Barkas	Episodes 1–4
2023	Slow Horses	Douglas	Series 3; episodes 1, 4 & 5
2024	Lost Boys and Fairies	Gabriel	Mini-series; episodes 1–3
2025	The Guest	Lee Mace	Episodes 1–4
