= Emma Jane Unsworth =

English writer

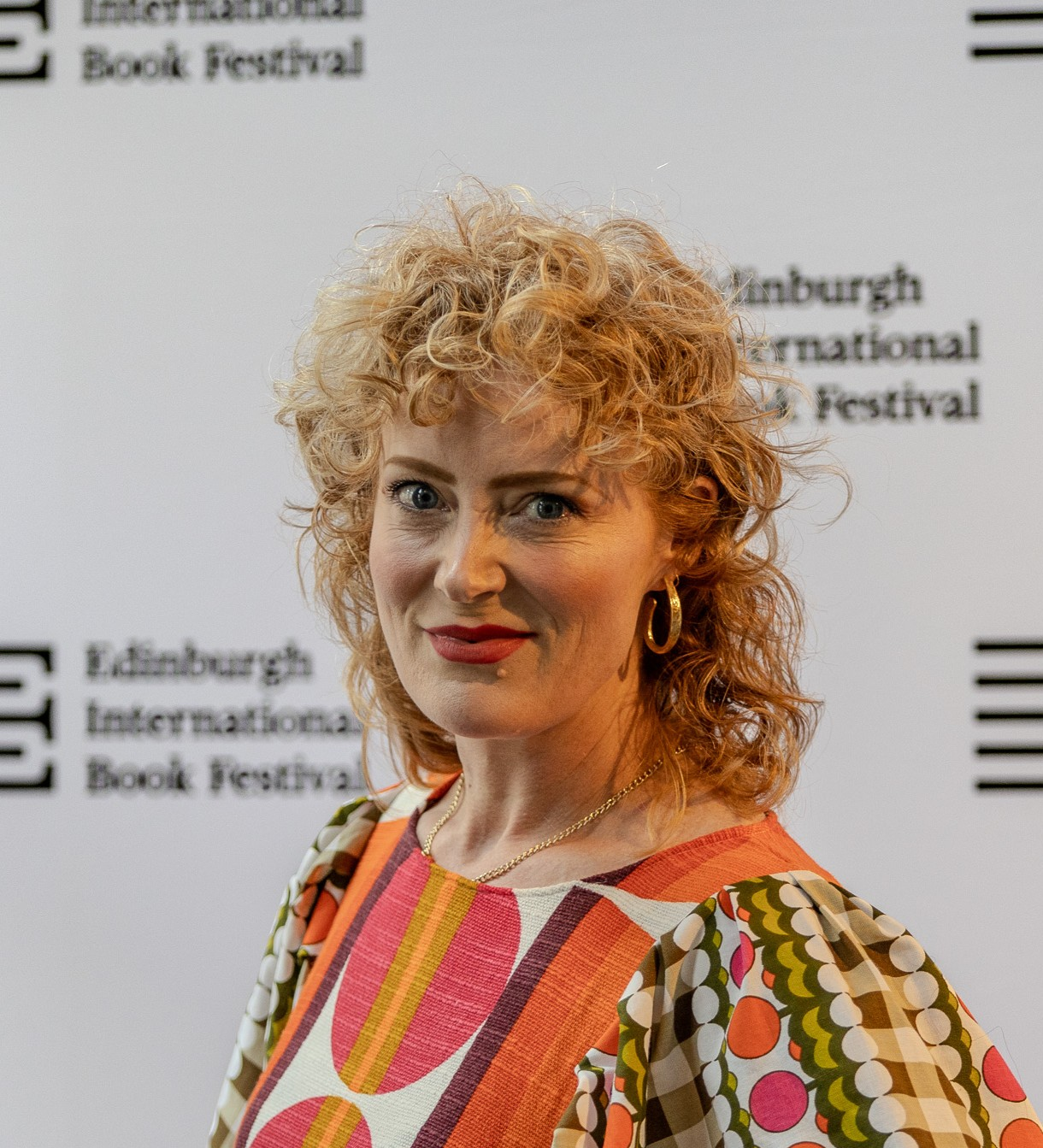
- Born: 1979 (age 46–47); Bury, Greater Manchester, England
- Occupations: Short story writer, novelist
- Writing career
- Language: English
- Notable works: Hungry, the Stars and Everything; Animals

Emma Jane Unsworth (born 1979) is an English writer from Bury, Greater Manchester. She writes short stories and has had four novels published; Hungry, the Stars and Everything (2011), Animals (2014), Adults (2020) and Slags (2025) .

== Education ==
Unsworth grew up in Prestwich and attended Bowker Vale Infant School and Crumpsall Lane Junior School before becoming a pupil at Bury Grammar School for Girls. It was at Bury Grammar that she met writer Sherry Ashworth, then a teacher, who became a mentor and friend and who later published Unsworth's first novel under her Hidden Gem Press imprint. Unsworth studied English literature at the University of Liverpool and graduated with an MA from Manchester University's Centre for New Writing.

== Early work ==
Unsworth's short fiction has been published in various places including by Comma Press, and her story I Arrive First was included in The Best British Short Stories 2012, published by Salt.

She has also worked as a journalist and is a former columnist for The Big Issue in the North.

== Novels ==
=== Hungry, the Stars and Everything ===
Her debut novel Hungry, the Stars and Everything, was published in June 2011 by Hidden Gem Press and won a Betty Trask Award from the Society of Authors. The novel was also shortlisted for the Portico Prize for Fiction 2012.

Set in a restaurant called Bethel, the novel follows the life of restaurant critic Helen as she eats her way through a tasting menu, evoking memories. Unsworth used the name Bethel for her setting after her friend, the chef Mary-Ellen McTague, had considered but rejected using it for her new restaurant Aumbry which she opened in Prestwich. The following year Unsworth and McTague worked together to create a real life version of the meal featured in the book as part of Prestwich Book Festival. The event was held at Aumbry, with diners able to eat some of the dishes that appeared in the novel whilst Unsworth read extracts of her book at intervals throughout the meal.

=== Animals ===
Unsworth's second novel, Animals, was published in 2014. The book follows the hedonistic adventures of two young women, best friends Laura and Tyler, as they live their lives in a fog of alcohol and drugs, before circumstances and their friendships start to change. The book received positive reviews, with writer Caitlin Moran describing it as "Withnail for Girls" and declaring that she wished she had written it. The Guardian praised Unsworth as "a tremendous talent". The New York Times praised the novel as "an emotionally complex and often go-for-broke-witty book".

The book was later optioned by BAFTA-nominated producer Sarah Brocklehurst and awarded BFI funding with Unsworth tasked with writing the screenplay. The film, directed by Australian director Sophie Hyde, starring Holliday Grainger and filmed in Dublin, premiered at the Sundance Film Festival in 2019.

== Curious Tales Collective ==
In 2013 Unsworth collaborated with writers Alison Moore, Jenn Ashworth, Tom Fletcher and Richard Hirst to produce a collection of Christmas ghost stories, published as The Longest Night. The edition was limited to 300 copies and the writers performed atmospheric readings in venues which included one in a supposedly haunted room which had previously been used as a morgue, in The Church Inn, Prestwich.

The following year, the Curious Tales Collective released a second volume of short stories entitled Poor Souls Light which celebrated the centenary of Robert Aickman and saw contributions from the original group of writers, plus guest writers M John Harrison and Johnny Mains. The edition again had a limited run, this time with 500 copies published. Both works contained illustrations by artist Beth Ward.

== Other work ==
In November 2014 Unsworth took part in Manchester Central Library's Chaos to Order season which involved musicians and artists taking over the newly refurbished library for a week and organising a diverse range of events. Unsworth became the Writer in Residence and spent the week running drop-in writing workshops, Q&A sessions with contemporary writers from around the UK, and daily readings of Frank O'Hara's Lunch Poems.

In 2021, Unsworth co-wrote the second episode of BBC One comedy drama The Outlaws with series creator Stephen Merchant.

In 2023 Unsworth was the showrunner for the Sky Atlantic series Dreamland, starring Lily Allen and Freema Agyeman.

== Works ==
Short stories

- "Doppelganger" – Comma: An Anthology (Comma Press, 2002, ISBN 978-1-85754-685-9)
- Manchester Stories 3 (Comma Press, 2002, ISBN 978-954-01-0842-1)
- "What I Did on my Holidays" – Bracket: A New Generation in Fiction (Comma Press, 2005, ISBN 978-1-85754-769-6)
- "Saturday Mary" – Phobic: Modern Horror Stories (Comma Press, 2007, ISBN 978-1-905583-07-2)
- "Patience" – Litmus: Short Stories from Modern Science (Comma Press, 2011, ISBN 978-1-905583-33-1)
- "Fight or Flight" – Murmurations: An Anthology of Uncanny Stories About Birds (Two Ravens Press, 2011, ISBN 978-1-906120-59-7)
- "I Arrive First" – The Best British Short Stories 2012 (Salt Publishing, 2012, ISBN 978-1-907773-18-1)
- "In" – The Longest Night (Curious Tales, 2013)
- "The Endling" – Poor Souls' Light (Curious Tales, 2014)

Novels

- Hungry, the Stars and Everything (Hidden Gem Press) 2011 ISBN 978-0-9568026-1-3
- Animals (Canongate) 2014 ISBN 978-1-78211-212-9
- Adults (The Borough Press) 2020 ISBN 978-0-008334-59-8
- Slags (The Borough Press) 2025 ISBN 978-0-00-834725-3

Collections edited by Unsworth

- Gothic Tales: Manchester Stories 7 (Comma Press, 2004, ISBN 978-1-85754-792-4)
