= Seriencamp =

Annual international television festival held in Germany

- Location: Cologne, Germany (2023–); Munich, Germany (2015–2022)
- Founded: 2015; 11 years ago
- Website: www.seriencamp.tv

Seriencamp (German: Internationales Festival für Serien und TV-Kultur) is an international television festival held annually in Germany. The first few editions were held in Munich, but the festival was moved to Cologne in 2023. The festival aims to screen the premieres of television series around the world.

== History ==
The event is organized by Seriencamp UG. The first edition of Seriencamp was held from 15 to 18 October 2015 at the University of Television and Film Munich, which attracted more than 5,000 spectators. In 2016, Seriencamp awards were presented for the first time.

Due to the COVID-19 pandemic in Germany, the 2020 festival was held virtually through video on demand platform, Watchroom in November. The next year, the festival took place hybrid. In addition to the digital screenings, there were screenings at the Astor Film Lounge at ARRI in Munich.

In 2023, the festival was moved to Cologne.

== Festival overview ==
No.	Year	Date	Ref.
1st	2015	15–18 October	
2nd	2016	20–23 October	
3rd	2017	27–29 October	
4th	2018	9–11 November	
5th	2019	8–10 November	
6th	2020	5–22 November	
7th	2021	10–28 November	
8th	2022	6–9 October	
9th	2023	14–16 June	
10th	2024	5–8 June	
11th	2025	3–5 June	
12th	2026	9-11 June	

== Awards ==
The following awards were presented at the festival:

=== Seriencamp Official Competition ===
Year	Series	Network	Country/Region
2016	Call My Agent!	France 2	France
2017	Generation B	VRT Canvas	Belgium
2018	Informer	BBC One	United Kingdom
2019	ZeroZeroZero	Sky Atlantic	Italy
2020	The Pack	Amazon Prime Video	Chile
2021	Thunder in My Heart	Viaplay	Sweden
2022	I Am Earth	NRK	Norway
2023	I'm a Virgo	Amazon Prime Video	United States
2024	Lost Boys and Fairies	BBC One	United Kingdom

=== Digital Short Form Award ===
Year	Series	Country/Region
2016	Fett und Fett	Germany
2017	Bruce	Australia
2018	This Is Desmondo Ray!	Australia
2019	Lost In Traplanta	France
2020	Tu préfères	France
2021	Tony	Argentina
2022	Sexfluencing	United Kingdom
2023	Martine À La Plage	Canada
2024	Samuel	France

=== Critics' Choice Award ===
Year	Series	Network	Country/Region
2021	Reservation Dogs	FX on Hulu	United States
2022	The Bear	Hulu	United States
2023	Bargain	TVING	South Korea
2024	Show Yourself	Atresplayer	Spain
2026	Trespasses	Channel 4	North Ireland

=== Audience Choice Award ===
Year	Series	Network	Country/Region
2016	Westworld	HBO	United States
2017	Mary Kills People	Global	Canada
2018	Undercover	VRT 1	Belgium, Netherlands
2019	Beforeigners	HBO Nordic, HBO Max	Norway
2020	Trickster	CBC	Canada
2021	The Last Socialist Artefact	HRT	Croatia
2022	Reign Supreme	Arte, Netflix	France
2023	The Shadow	ZDF	Germany
2024	30 Days of Lust	SWR	Germany
2026	Happiness		

=== Pilot Peek Award ===
Year	Series	Country/Region
2023	Appetite	Australia
2024	Preferably Yesterday	Germany

== See also ==
- List of television festivals
