= Animals (novel) =

2014 novel by Emma Jane Unsworth

- Author: Emma Jane Unsworth
- Publisher: Canongate Books
- Publication date: May 1, 2014
- Award: Jerwood Fiction Uncovered Prize (2015)

Animals is the second novel of British writer Emma Jane Unsworth. The book was published in 2014 by Canongate Books in the U.K. and HarperCollins in the U.S. and Canada.

Set in Manchester, the novel follows best friends Laura and Tyler, codependent alcoholics whose lifestyle comes under scrutiny after Laura becomes engaged to Jim, a pianist and a teetotaler.

== Plot ==
Laura is a 32-year-old woman working at a call centre in Manchester who is struggling as a writer. She lives with her best friend, Tyler, an American with plenty of money who bankrolls their hard drinking lifestyle.

A year earlier Laura met Jim, a pianist, at a bar. The two quickly fell in love and were engaged, though shortly afterwards Jim decides to stop drinking, a decision Laura pretends to approve of. As their wedding draws closer Tyler begins to grow increasingly upset by Laura's marriage and Laura begins to feel torn between the two. Though she is ambivalent about having children, Jim persuades Laura to stop using contraception. Jim also begins to pressure Laura to stop drinking.

On a night out Tyler passes Laura some drugs wrapped in a flyer for a library lecture on W. B. Yeats. Laura goes to the lecture and afterwards talks and flirts with the lecturer, professor Marty Grane.

Later, on a trip to London for Tyler's nephew's christening, the two run into Marty, who went to school with Tyler. Claiming her phone is dead, Tyler has Laura exchange numbers with Marty, who later sends her a picture of his erect penis.

Trying to compromise between Tyler and Jim, Laura goes out for a night of drinking with Tyler for her 30th birthday and then the next day flies to Stockholm to visit Jim where he is touring. On her night out with Tyler, Laura and Tyler spot Marie, a drug dealer that Tyler once stole from. Though they think they have escaped detection, Laura returns from Stockholm to find that Tyler has been badly beaten as Marie followed her home and robbed her once Laura had left. The two flee for Edinburgh where they meet up with Marty. Laura takes drugs and drinks heavily, and finds herself fighting a strong attraction to Marty. When he corners her in the bathroom she realizes that Tyler has been encouraging Marty to help her cheat by revealing a specific sexual fetish of hers. Enraged she leaves for home.

Laura stays at Jim's but at one of his work events she eventually realizes that he stopped drinking because he cheated on her with Kirsten, a woman in the orchestra. Upset she flees back to Tyler's place where she finds her overdosed on drugs and alcohol. Laura nurses Tyler back to health, but when Tyler is healed she resumes her drinking, eventually confessing to Laura that she did intentionally give her the flyer so that she would end up with Marty.

Six months later Laura still drinks, though not to excess, and has finally moved out on her own. She no longer associates with Jim or Tyler.

== Reception ==
The novel received positive reviews on publication, with writer Caitlin Moran describing it as "Withnail for Girls" and declaring that she wished she had written it. The Guardian praised Unsworth as "a tremendous talent". The New York Times praised the novel as "an emotionally complex and often go-for-broke-witty book".

Animals won the 2015 Jerwood Fiction Uncovered Prize.

== Adaptation ==
The novel was adapted into a film of the same name (relocated to Dublin) in 2019, directed by Sophie Hyde and starring Holliday Grainger and Alia Shawkat as Laura and Tyler.
