= Angelbert Metoyer =

American visual artist

- Born: Angelbert Metoyer; July 7, 1977 (age 48); Houston, Texas
- Education: Atlanta College of Art
- Known for: Mixed media
- Website: https://www.angelbertmetoyer.com/

Angelbert Metoyer (AN-gel-bər MUH-twy-ər; born July 7, 1977) is an American visual artist specializing in afrofuturism. Metoyer began his artistic career through Rick Lowe's Project Row Houses in Houston, Texas and held his first solo exhibition there in 1994. He subsequently moved to Atlanta to study drawing and painting at the Atlanta College of Art. Although a bit of a nomad having lived in various parts of the world, Metoyer currently lives in Houston and Rotterdam.

Metoyer's art explores memory and social history through the lenses of science, philosophy, and religion. He works in various media, including drawing, painting, installation, and sound. He appropriates unusual art materials, which he calls "excrements of industry," that include coal, glass, debris, oil, tar, mirrors, and gold dust.

Metoyer's work is in the permanent collections of the US Department of State, Houston Museum of Fine Art, The Charles, H. Wright Museum, African American Museum of Contemporary Art, the ACE Collection, and the Museum of Fine Arts in Leipzig, Germany. He has shown at the Venice Biennale, Art Basel Miami, and a renegade show Art Basel Switzerland.

Metoyer is regularly published in essays and studies accompanying exhibitions including Strange Pilgrims. He is also featured as one of five Black artists of particular significance in Collecting Black Studies: The Art of Material Culture at the University of Texas at Austin.

In addition, his artwork has been used in many album and book covers, including Mike Ladd's Negrophilia, Saul Williams' Niggy Tardust, Bilal's In Another Life (2015) and VOYAGE-19 (2020), and Marcus Guillery's Red Now and Laters.

== Exhibitions ==
=== Selected solo exhibits ===
- 2019: Clay and Coal: Modern Spirited Essentialism, presented by KRSTO, Monterrey, Mexico
- 2017: Angelbert Metoyer, Real Eyes (Realize) - An Artist's Survey: 1987 - 2017, Deborah Colton Gallery, Houston, Texas, United States
- 2017: Play for the Sun, Ludlow House, New York City, United States
- 2016: Wrestling History: Points Along a Journey of Dis/covery Hidden in the Temple, The New Gallery, Warfield Center Galleries, The University of Texas, Austin, Texas, United States
- 2015: Angelbert Metoyer: Life Machine, The Contemporary Austin, presented by Co-Lab Projects Pop-Up @ Canopy, Austin, Texas, United States
- 2014: Seasons of Heaven, Deborah Colton Gallery, Houston, Texas, United States
- 2012: Angelbert Metoyer, Babies Walk on Water: Present, Future and Time Travel, Deborah Colton Gallery, Houston Texas, United States
- 2012: Urban Decay, Ravi Photo Gallery, Hyderabad, India All About Urban Decay
- 2011: Levels, Forms and Dimensions, Deborah Colton Gallery, Houston Texas, United States
- 2010: Angelbert Metoyer: Icon Execution, G.R. N'Namdi Gallery, Chicago Illinois, United States
- 2010: Medicine For a Nightmare (Outdoor Sound Installation), Shoreham, Kent, United Kingdom
- 2010: 13 Dimensions, Special Project Space, Dubai, United Arab Emirates
- 2010: Angelbert Metoyer: Paintings, Joysmith Gallery, Memphis, Tennessee, United States
- 2010: Genograms and Genius: The Genius/The Genitive/The Genius, Gallery Sunsum, Memphis, Tennessee, United States
- 2009: War-Beau, The Struggle Between the Eternal and Immortal, Giovanni Rossi Fine Arts during Art Basel Miami Beach Fair Week, Miami, Florida, United States
- 2009: Global static, Sandler Hudson Gallery, Atlanta, Georgia, United States
- 2009: Lu-x, Thom Andriola/New Gallery, Houston, Texas, United States
- 2008: House of Warriors-Part Two, African-American Museum, Dallas, Texas, United States
- 2008: House of Warriors-Part One, Gerald Peters Gallery, Dallas, Texas, United States
- 2008: Ask, Dactyl Foundation for the Arts and Humanities, New York, New York, United States
- 2008: The Lu-X experiment (Dreams), Thom Andriola/New Gallery, Houston, Texas, United States
- 2007: Days and Days of Recorded Light, G Gallery, Houston, Texas, United States
- 2007: Force of Nature: #2, Paul Rodgers/9W, New York, New York, United States
- 2006: 52 and one (Four Seasons), Sandler Hudson Gallery, Atlanta, Georgia, United States
- 2006: Three Brides of Aurora: The Magicians Memory of Myth, Gerald Peters Gallery, Dallas, Texas, United States
- 2006: A New World With Its Own Vocabulary, Museum of African-American Life and Culture, Dallas, Texas, United States
- 2006: Force of Nature: Masquerade of the Divine, Paul Rogers/9W Gallery, New York, New York, United States
- 2006: Angelbert Metoyer, American Art Collector, Scottsdale, Arizona, United States
- 2006: Maps to Heaven, G Gallery, Houston, Texas, United States
- 2005: Angelbert Metoyer, University Art Gallery, University of California, San Diego, La Jolla, California, United States
- 2005: Doors Two Space 11811, G Gallery/Gallery 101, Houston, Texas, United States
- 2005: Force of Nature 1, Paul Rogers/9W Gallery, New York, New York, United States
- 2005: Angelbert Metoyer, Gerald Peters Gallery, Dallas, Texas, United States
- 2004: 13 Moments In a Black Sunrise, Gerald Peters Gallery, Dallas, Texas, United States
- 2004: Angelbert Metoyer, Ace Collection, Genesis Park, Houston, Texas, United States
- 2004: Music Marking Making Music, Paul Rogers/9W Gallery, New York, New York, United States
- 2004: Works On Paper 11011, G Gallery/Gallery 101, Houston, Texas, United States
- 2003: Studies For Intergalactic Heavens, Sandler Hudson Gallery, Atlanta, Georgia, United States
- 2003: Cosmic Water (God 11611), Thom Andriola /New Gallery, Houston, Texas, United States
- 2003: Dark Energy Splitting the Universe, Paul Rogers/9W Gallery, New York, New York, United States
- 2003: Oxford Muse Imagi-nation Festival Art Exhibit, Angelbert Imagination Studios, Houston, Texas, United States
- 2002: God XXXXX, Thom Andriola/New Gallery, Houston, Texas, United States
- 2002: God 11511, Red Bud Gallery, Houston, Texas, United States
- 2002: Indigo Temple, Private Venue, Houston, Texas, United States
- 1999: God 3, Galveston Arts Center, Galveston, TX, United States
- 1999: God 11411, Barbara Davis gallery, Houston, Texas, United States
- 1998: Angelbert Metoyer : Recent Work, Barbara Davis Gallery, Houston, Texas, United States
- 1998: Angelbert Metoyer: An Exhibit, Gallery Thirty-Nine 17, Houston, Texas, United States
- 1998: God 11711, Project Row Houses, Houston, Texas, United States
- 1995: Social Relevance, Project Row Houses, Houston, Texas, United States
- 1994: Angelbert Metoyer: Solo Exhibition, Project Row Houses, Houston, Texas, United States

=== Selected group exhibits ===
- 2017: Afterlife, Tripoli Gallery, Southampton, NY
- 2016: A Stirring Song Sung Heroic: African Americans from Slavery to Freedom, 1619–1865 and Beyond, Alexandria Museum of Art, Alexandria, Louisiana, United States
- 2016: New Beginnings: The Shape of Things to Come, Galveston Arts Center, Galveston, Texas, United States
- 2016: Slip-stream, Curated Works by Susie Kalil, Kirk Hopper Fine Art, Dallas, Texas, United States
- 2015: Strange Pilgrims, The Contemporary Austin, Austin, Texas, United States, curated by Heather Pesanti
- 2012 Visions of Our 44th President, The Charles H. Right Museum of African American history, Detroit Michigan, United States
- 2012: Transformations 2012!, Deborah Colton Gallery, Houston, Texas, United States
- 2012: Use Your illusion, curated by Paul Horn, Deborah Colton Gallery, Houston, Texas, United States
- 2011: Go West: First Bilateral Contemporary Art Exhibited between France and Texas, Unesco, Paris, France
- 2011: Nobody Knows My Name: The African-American Experience in American Culture, curated by Philip E. Collins, Mckinney Avenue Contemporary, Dallas, Texas, United States
- 2011: Mixing the Medium, Deborah Colton Gallery, Houston, Texas, United States
- 2011: Getting Louder, Special Project Space, Beijing, China
- 2011: Use You Illusion, Deborah Colton Gallery, Houston, Texas, United States, curated by Paul Horn
- 2010: London Contemporary VGM, London, United Kingdom
- 2010: Texas Drops Off Some Cloth, Museo de Arte Moderno de Trujillio, Trujillio, Peru
- 2009: The Talented Ten -part one, Deborah called Gallery, Houston Texas, United States
- 2009: Before We Let Go, Hamptons: Tripoli Gallery of Contemporary Art, New York, New York, United States
- 2009: Mind Game, Sound Insulation in Collaboration with Artist Madeline Vriesendorp, during Venice Biennale, Venice, Italy
- 2009: Object Show, Gorilla Show, Seattle, Washington, United States
- 2009: True Cities: Sound Installations About China, Aedes Land Gallery, Berlin, Germany
- 2008: Born-Again Again: An Exhibition of Political Commentaries, curated by Eddie Steinhauer, Five Myles, New York, New York, United States
- 2008: Hope Change Progress, Art Focus for Obama, curated by Derrick Adams, G.R. N'Namdi Gallery, New York, New York, United States
- 2008: Houston Collects: African-American Art, Museum of Fine Arts Houston, Houston, Texas, United States
- 2008: Richard Wright At 100, National Civil Rights Museum, Memphis, Tennessee, United States
- 2008: Qatar Naked Narratives: A Country Expressed by Its Own Voice, Deborah Colton Gallery, Houston, Texas, United States
- 2008: Ulterior Motives, curated by Wayne Gilbert and Jeffrey wheeler, Camp Marfa, Crazywood gallery, Huntsville, Texas, United States
- 2008: Born Again and Again #2, curated by Eddie Steinhauer, during Art Basel Miami Beach Fair Week, Miami, Florida, United States
- 2007: International Texas Exhibition: Amistad-Texas Art in Peru, curated by Gus Kopriva, Museo de la Nacion, Lima, Peru
- 2007: Untitled, Museo de Arte Moderno, foundation Gerardo Chavez, Trujillo, Peru
- 2007: Ulterior Motifs No. 10, Arlington Museum of Art, Arlington, Texas, United States
- 2007: Ulterior Motifs (Trunk Show), Gerald Peters Gallery, Dallas, Texas, United States
- 2007: Ulterior Motifs No. 11, Wichita Falls Museum of Art, Wichita Falls, Texas, United States Camp Marfa, Huntsville, Texas, United States
- 2007: Camp Marfa, Huntsville, Texas, United States, curated by Wayne Gilbert and Lester Marks
- 2006: Houston Contemporary Art, curated by Christopher Zhu and Gus Kopriva, Shanghai Art Museum, Shanghai, China
- 2006: In Celebration of the Black Woman, Sandler Hudson Gallery, Atlanta, Georgia, United States
- 2006: Six Texas Artists in Germany, MonchsKirche, Salzwedel, Germany
- 2006: New Work, Sandler Hudson Gallery, Atlanta, Georgia, United States
- 2006: Ulterior Motifs No. 9, Fine Arts Gallery, The Buddy Holly Center, Lubbock, TX, United States
- 2004: Round Seventeen, Project Row Houses, Houston, Texas, United States
- 2004: Ulterior Motifs No. 7: A Celebratory Art Extravaganza, Amarillo Museum of Art, Amarillo, Texas, United States
- 2004: Rubber happiness, San Jose institute of contemporary art, San Jose, California, Traveled to Leipzig, Germany
- 2004: The Space Between, Lowell Collins Art Gallery, Houston, Texas, United States
- 2004: Ulterior Motifs No.6, A Celebratory Art Extravaganza, Wheeler Brothers Studio, Lubbock, Texas, United States
- 2004: Ulterior Motifs No. 8, New Braunfels Museum of Art and Music, New Braunfels, Texas, United States
- 2004: Ambros Mundos, El Museo Provincial Emilio Bacardi Moreau de Santiago, Santiago, Cuba
- 2003: Marie Thérèse Coincoin Crosses, Special Project Space, Havana, Cuba
- 2002: Houston Works, Artco Gallery, Leipzig, Germany
- 2001: Our New Day Begun: African-American Artists Entering the New Millennium, Texas Southern University Museum, Houston, Texas (Travelled to LBJ Library-Museum, Austin, Texas and African American Museum, Dallas, Texas, United States)
- 2000: Fotofest 2000-The Eighth International Month of Photography, Fotofest, Houston, Texas, United States
- 2000: Mania, Artcar museum, Houston, Texas, United States
- 1999: Texas Paper: Works On Paper By Texas Artists, The Gallery at UTA, University of Texas at Arlington, Arlington, Texas, United States
- 1999: Response Time, Artcar museum, Houston, Texas, United States
- 1999: Gallery Artists, New York, Barbara Davis Gallery, Houston, Texas, United States
- 1999: Houston Draws, Contemporary Arts Museum Houston, Houston, Texas, United States
- 1997: Raw Talent, Camille Love Gallery, Atlanta, Georgia, United States
- 1996: Definitions, Gallery 100, Atlanta, Georgia, United States
- 1996: Emergence Resurgence, Hammonds House Museum, Atlanta, Georgia, United States
- 1996: 200/200, New Vision Art Gallery, Atlanta, Georgia, United States
- 1996: Projected, Space One Eleven, Birmingham, Alabama, United States
- 1996: Houston Area Exhibition, Blaffer Gallery, University of Houston, Houston, Texas, United States
- 1995: Changing Perspectives, Contemporary Arts Museum Houston, Houston, Texas, United States
- 1995: Social Syrup, Project Row Houses, Houston, Texas, United States

== Art fairs ==
- 2011: Dallas Art Fair, Deborah Colton Gallery, Dallas, Texas, United States
- 2011: Houston Fine Arts Fair, Deborah Colton Gallery, Houston, Texas, United States
- 2010: M.M.T. Positivism Project during Art Basel Miami Beach Fair Week, Miami, Florida, United States
- 2010: Contemporary Art SF, Gallery Sunsum, San Francisco, California, United States
- 2010: Dallas Art Fair, Deborah Colton Gallery, Dallas, Texas, United States
- 2009: Renegade show at Venice Biennale
- 2009: 911 Installation, Bridge Art Fair, New York, New York, United States

== Sound installations ==
- 2016-17: Collaboration with B. L. A. C. K. I. E. - series of 52 albums to be released over 24 months
- 2012: Sonic Graffiti (Sound Installation), Contemporary Arts Museum Houston, Houston, Texas, United States
- 2009: Venice Biennale, renegade art project sonic graffiti
- 2008: Ping Pong Art Space, Guangzho

== Album and book cover collaborations ==
- Myronn Hardy's Radioactive Starlings:Poems (Princeton University Press)
- Mike Ladd's Negrophilia
- Saul Williams' US (a)
- Saul Williams' Niggy Tardust
- Bilal's In Another Life (2015) and VOYAGE-19 (2020)
- Marcus Guillery's Red Now and Laters.
