= 1995 (disambiguation) =

1995 was a common year starting on Sunday of the Gregorian calendar.

1995 may also refer to:

- 1995 (number)
- 1995 (band), a French rap band
- 1995 (Screaming Headless Torsos album)
- 1995 (song), a 2014 song by Eraserheads
- 1995, a 2016 song by Sakura Fujiwara
- Delete Yourself!, a 1995 album by Atari Teenage Riot, originally released as 1995
- 1995 (film), a Canadian comedy-drama film
- "1995" (Our Friends in the North), a TV episode
