= Screaming Headless Torsos =

Jazz rock band

- Genres: experimental rock, funk rock, rock, jazz fusion, jazz rock
- Years active: 1989–present
- Labels: Discovery Records, R.D.S./Rough Trade Records
- Members: Freedom Bremner; David Fiuczynski; David Ginyard; Daniel Sadownick; Gene Lake; Skoota Warner
- Past members: Dean Bowman; Fima Ephron; John Medeski; Jojo Mayer
- Website: www.torsos.com

Screaming Headless Torsos, also known as the Torsos or SHT, is a jazz rock band formed in 1989, currently consisting of founding member and guitarist David Fiuczynski, vocalist Freedom Bremner, bassist David Ginyard, percussionist Daniel Sadownick, and the alternating drum chair of Jojo Mayer, Gene Lake, Skoota Warner and James "Biscuit" Rouse.

== Discography ==
- 1995 (1995)
- Live!! (2001)
- 2005 (2005)
- Live in New York & Paris(DVD) (2005) -recorded at the Knitting Factory in New York City and at the club New Morning in Paris.
- Choice Cuts (2006)

== Reception ==
In 1994, a review in Billboard magazine called Screaming Headless Torsos an "eclectic quintet", expressing surprise that the band had not yet been signed by a major label: "With a lead vocalist who has a startling range, and a tight band that comfortably weaves jazz, reggae, salsa, and metal, this band deserves and demands attention".
