= Voyage-19 =

EP by Bilal and HighBreedMusic (Note: Bilal and HighBreedMusic are officially credited as the EP's artists.)
- Released: September 6, 2020
- Recorded: August 7–9, 2020
- Studio: HighBreedMusic (Brooklyn); various home studios
- Genre: Experimental; soul
- Length: 14:40
- Label: Self-released (Bandcamp) (Note: Gary Graff, reporting for The Oakland Press, credits the EP's release label as Bandcamp.)
- Producer: Bilal; Tariq Khan

Bilal chronology
In Another Life (2015)	Voyage-19 (2020)

Voyage-19 is an EP by the American singer-songwriter Bilal, in collaboration with HighBreedMusic, a music studio and production company in Brooklyn, New York. It was released digitally on September 6, 2020, through the music publishing platform Bandcamp and is his first EP, as well as his first album-type release since 2015's In Another Life.

Produced by Bilal with HighBreedMusic owner Tariq Khan, Voyage-19 was recorded over the course of three days in August 2020 with 30 other musicians, including fellow singer-songwriter Erykah Badu, the pianist Robert Glasper, the saxophonist Marcus Strickland, the harpist Brandee Younger, and the drummer Marcus Gilmore. Its recording sessions, spanning 54 hours, were conducted remotely due to the COVID-19 pandemic lockdowns and streamed live on YouTube. The cover art was designed by the visual artist Angelbert Metoyer.

A musically experimental work, Voyage-19 reflects contemporary societal concerns in its themes. With many of the contributing musicians struggling financially because of the pandemic, they received revenues from the EP as well as any direct donations that accompanied its sale. Critics received the work positively, impressed by the musicians' musicality and ambitions under the circumstances.

== Recording and production ==
Voyage-19 is Bilal's first recorded release since his guest appearances in late 2019 on the Queen & Slim soundtrack and the pianist Robert Glasper's mixtape Fuck Yo Feelings. It is also his first album-type release in five years, following his fifth album In Another Life (2015).

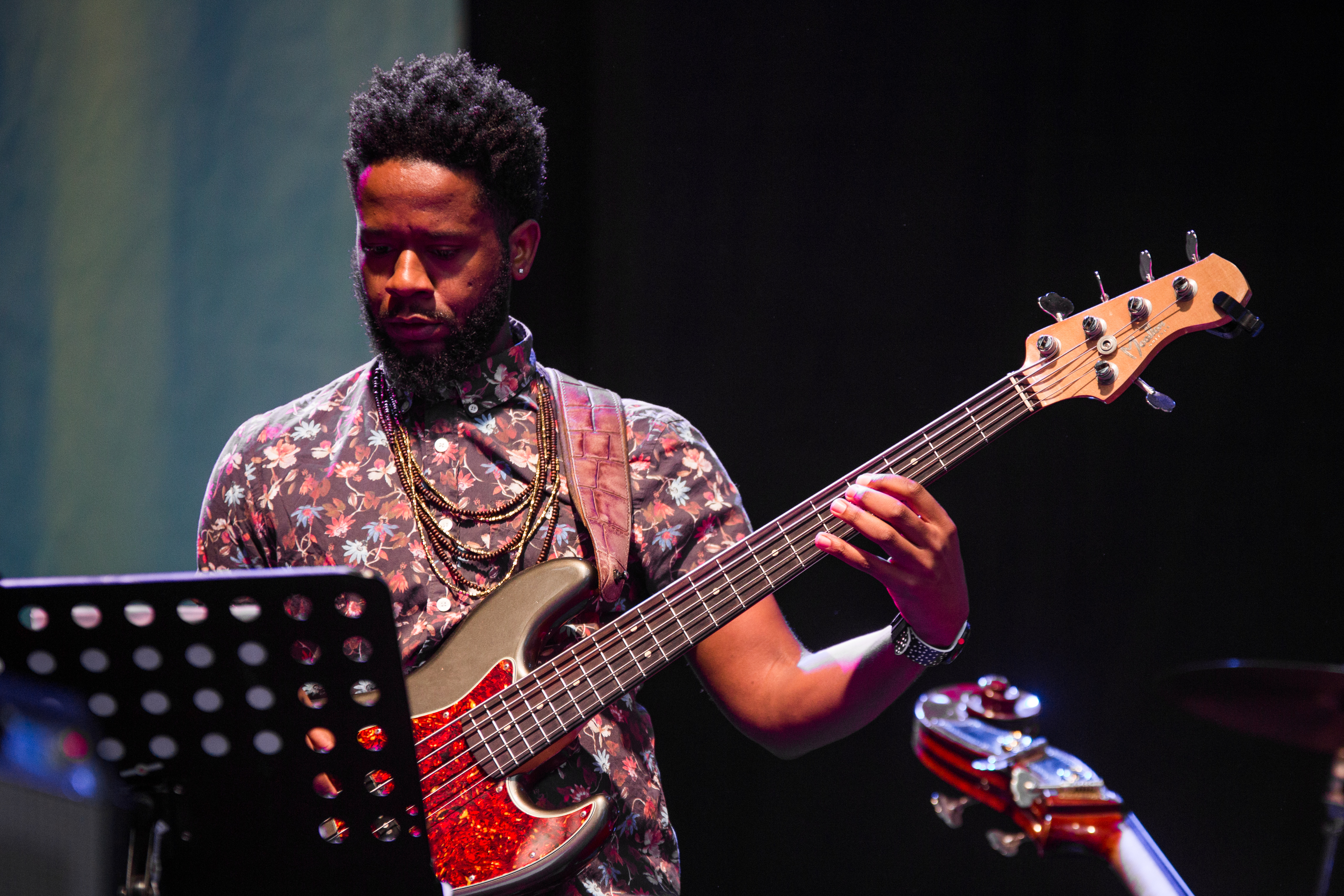
The bassist Ben Williams, among the EP's many contributing musicians

Bilal wrote and recorded the EP over the course of a three-day weekend from August 7 to August 9, 2020, in partnership with HighBreedMusic, a Brooklyn-based recording studio, production company, and digital music channel. He produced alongside HighBreedMusic owner Tariq Khan, known for his collaborations with the singer-songwriters Erykah Badu and FKA Twigs.

Bilal conceived one song on each day of the EP's experimental sessions, which totaled 54 hours. He used a combination of the studio's technologies to interact and collaborate with 30 other musicians, who each created musical parts remotely from their home due to the COVID-19 pandemic lockdowns. Participating musicians included Glasper, Badu, the vocalists Melanie Charles and Madison McFerrin, the spoken-word poet Khemist, the bassists Tone Whitfield and Ben Williams, the trumpeter Keyon Harrold, the saxophonist Marcus Strickland, the keyboardists Raymond Angry and Simon Mavin (of Hiatus Kaiyote), the harpist Brandee Younger, and the drummer Marcus Gilmore. A number of musicians were longtime collaborators and friends of Bilal, as well as associates of HighBreedMusic.

== Music and lyrics ==
The EP is described by Cool Hunting editor Katie Olsen as an experimental work. According to the music journalist John Vettese, each song "represents a step along the journey through a very strange year", demonstrated most vividly on the EP's final track, "Voyage to a New World".

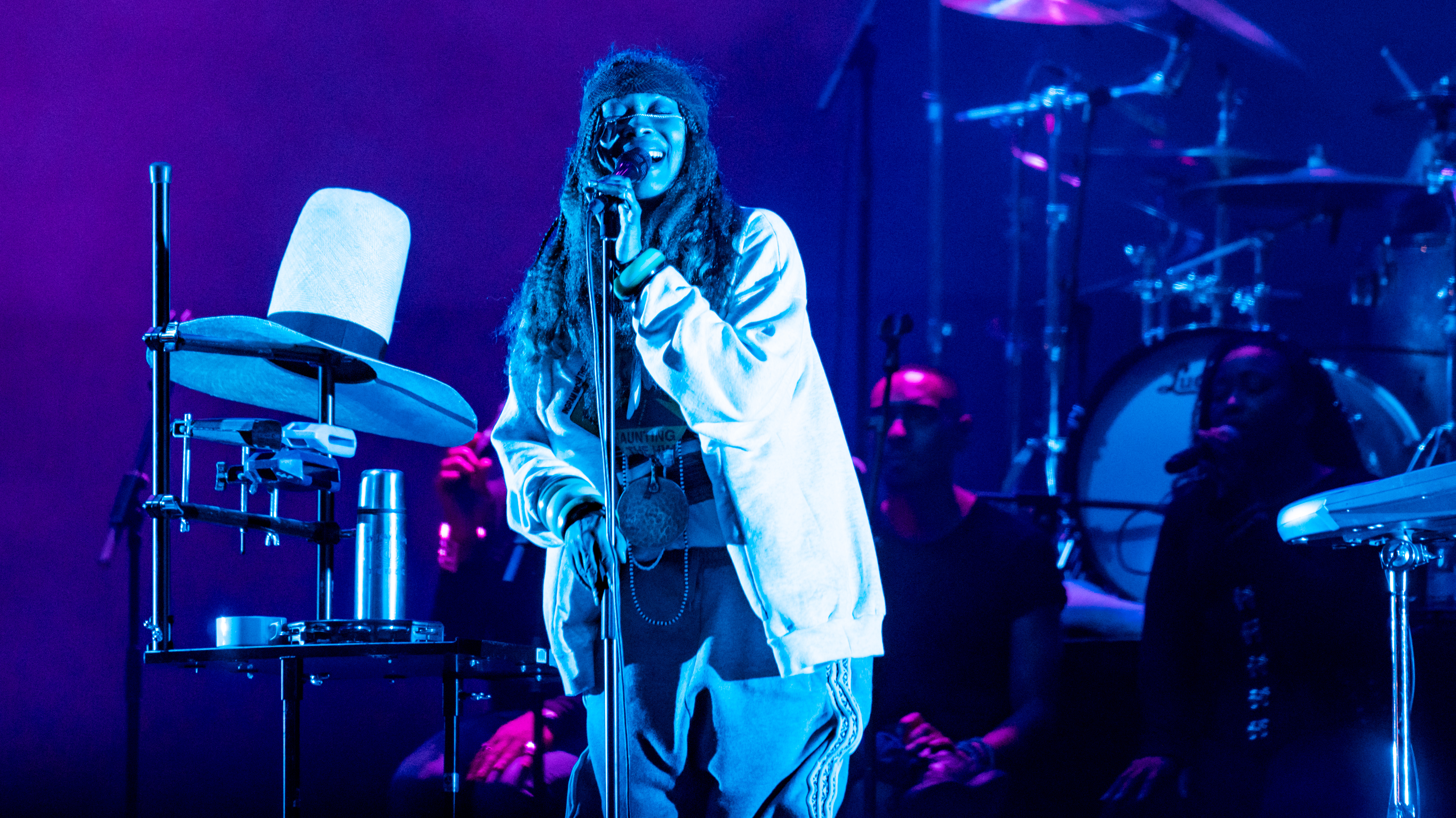
Erykah Badu in 2019

Opening with the sound of a bird song and Badu's poetry ("Wake up / You see that ship ahead? / Just walk, don't run"), "Voyage to a New World" is described by Olsen as "a kind of meditation before taking various twists and turns", as "distorted vocals and chaotic percussion lead to a lush, soulful flute-laden melody that soon morphs again." In Vettese's observations, the "experimentally structured piece" begins with "a space music synth tapestry, and switches moods with a bass drop to a series of different tones and textures, ultimately landing on a surreal groove reminiscent of Radiohead and Sun Ra, and guided by Melanie Charles' flute, BigYuki and Glasper's keyboards, and a choir of voices featuring Madison McFerrin, YahZarah, and Bilal himself."

The lyrics of "Voyage to a New World" depict "a crowd of people, troubled and in motion – there are differences among their backgrounds, differences in their response to their collective experience, but they are moving in the same direction", interprets Vettese. He concludes that the song's narrator sees this "through a Marvin Gaye-esque lens of cautious optimism" in the final verse.

In the new world, we'll make a better day / no stress, no more wars going, no more hate politics / I'll be waiting for the day

— Bilal, "DAY THREE – Voyage to a New World"

== Marketing ==
The EP was sold exclusively through the music publishing platform Bandcamp (logo pictured).

The EP's session events were streamed live in their entirety on YouTube. The broadcast simultaneously showed its artwork being made, with a visual artist enlisted during each song's making, including Angelbert Metoyer and Shanina Dionna. (Note: Metoyer had previously designed the cover art for Bilal's 2015 album In Another Life.) According to SoulBounce writer Briana Cakes, this virtual event was a "history-making affair".

Voyage-19 was originally available to be pre-ordered during the weekend of the broadcast. Proceeds from the sale of the pre-order were given to the participating artists, a number of whom were struggling financially because of the pandemic. Consumers were also given the option of making donations directly.

On September 6, 2020, the three-track EP was released on the music publishing platform Bandcamp as a digital download, at a price of $6.99. The profits from this sale were also distributed among the musicians.

== Critical reception ==
Writing for WXPN's The Key website in December 2020, Emily Herbein applauded Voyage-19 as a testament to the will power of musicians during 2020 and the beauty of their connectivity under the circumstances, citing it as among the year's best quarantine collaborations. "The result has been stunning projects like these that showcase versatility, uncharted musicality, and the drive to not give up in the face of this huge adversity", she wrote, expressing gratitude for how such music "adeptly represents this incredibly weird moment in time". A. D. Amorosi, in a January 2021 column for Dosage Magazine, made note of the project's "riveting, pleading musicality" and recommended it in a selection of Philadelphia-based soul music for listeners celebrating the inauguration of Joe Biden as the president of the United States and healing from the strange, transitional period in the country.

== Track listing ==
Information is taken from Bandcamp.

1. "Day One – Warning-19" – 4:57
2. "Day Two – Last Hope" – 3:38
3. "Day Three – Voyage to a New World" – 6:05

== Personnel ==
Credits are adapted from Bandcamp.

- Bendji Allonce – percussion (track 1)
- Ray Angry – synths (track 1)
- Erykah Badu – poetry (track 3)
- BigYuki – keyboards, synth (track 3)
- Bilal – lyrics, production, vocals (all tracks)
- Nikki Birch – whisper track (track 1), associate producer
- Joe Blaxx – drum set (track 2)
- Reuben Cainer – bass (track 3)
- James Casey – samples (track 1)
- Louis Cato – drums, guitar, percussion (track 3)
- Melanie Charles – flute, samples (track 3)
- Keyon Harrold – trumpet (track 1)
- Cory Henry – Moog synthesizer (track 1)
- Tariq Khan – mixing, production, recording (all tracks)
- Khemist – spoken word (track 1)
- Marcus Gilmore – drum set (track 3)
- Robert Glasper – piano, synth (track 3)
- Nick Hakim – samples, synth, vocals (track 3)
- Jill Newman Productions - event consultation
- Simon Mavin – keyboards (track 1)
- Madison McFerrin – vocals (track 3)
- Angelbert Metoyer – artwork
- Chris Rob – harpsichord (track 1)
- Randy Runyon – guitar (track 2)
- Chad Selph – organ (track 2)
- Jake Sherman – synth, Wurlitzer electric piano (track 2)
- Marcus Strickland – bass clarinet (track 1)
- Anu Sun – electronic drums (track 1)
- Chuck Treece – drum set (track 1)
- Tone Whitfield – bass (track 2)
- Ben Williams – bass (track 1)
- Brad Allen Williams – guitar (track 1)
- Jaime Woods – lyrics, vocals (track 2 and 3)
- Yahzarah – vocals (track 3)
- Akihito Yoshikawa – mastering (all tracks)
- Brandee Younger – harp (track 3)

== See also ==
- Impact of the COVID-19 pandemic on the music industry
