= Negrophilia: The Album =

Studio album by Mike Ladd
- Released: February 8, 2005
- Studio: Sorcerer Sound
- Genres: Hip-hop; jazz
- Length: 47:37
- Label: Thirsty Ear
- Producers: Mike Ladd; Guillermo E. Brown; Vijay Iyer; Marguerite Ladd

Mike Ladd chronology
Nostalgialator (2004)	Negrophilia: The Album (2005)	Father Divine (2005)

Singles from Negrophilia: The Album
- 1. "Shake It" Released: 2004

Negrophilia: The Album is a studio album by American hip-hop musician Mike Ladd. It was released on Thirsty Ear in 2005.

The album features contributions from Guillermo E. Brown, Vijay Iyer, Andrew Lamb, Roy Campbell, and Bruce Grant. It is inspired by Petrine Archer-Straw's book of the same name.

== Critical reception ==
Professional ratings
Aggregate scores
Source	Rating
Metacritic	73/100
Review scores
Source	Rating
All About Jazz	4/5 stars
AllMusic	4/5 stars
Exclaim!	favorable
Pitchfork	7.2/10
Tiny Mix Tapes	4/5 stars

At Metacritic, which assigns a weighted average score out of 100 to reviews from mainstream critics, the album received an average score of 73, based on 11 reviews, indicating "generally favorable reviews".

Andy Kellman of AllMusic called it "one of Ladd's most accomplished albums to date, proving once again that he's one of the most forward-thinking artists around."

== Track listing ==
No.	Title	Length
1.	"Field Work (The Ethnographer's Daughter)"	5:31
2.	"The French Dig Latinos, Too"	5:17
3.	"In Perspective"	7:00
4.	"Shake It"	3:19
5.	"Worldwide Shrinkwrap (Contact Zones)"	3:40
6.	"Back at Ya"	4:04
7.	"Appropriated Metro"	1:29
8.	"Blonde Negress"	3:22
9.	"Sam and Milli Dine Out"	4:44
10.	"Nancy and Carl Go Christmas Shopping"	4:01
11.	"Sleep Patterns of Black Expatriots Circa 1960"	5:10

== Personnel ==
Credits adapted from liner notes.

- Mike Ladd – vocals, programming
- Guillermo E. Brown – drums, electronics
- Vijay Iyer – piano, organ, synthesizer
- Andrew Lamb – winds
- Roy Campbell – trumpet
- Bruce Grant – tape loop
- Marguerite Ladd – sampler
