= Smash (Jackson and His Computerband album) =

Studio album by Jackson and His Computerband
- Released: 19 September 2005
- Length: 66:34
- Label: Warp
- Producer: Jackson and His Computerband

Jackson and His Computerband chronology
Smash (2005)	Glow (2013)

Alternative cover
- Promo sampler CD cover

Professional ratings
Aggregate scores
Source	Rating
Metacritic	66/100
Review scores
Source	Rating
AllMusic	3.5/5 stars
Exclaim!	favorable
Pitchfork	7.8/10
Stylus Magazine	B−

Smash is the debut studio album by Jackson and His Computerband. It was released via Warp in 2005.

== Critical reception ==
At Metacritic, which assigns a weighted average score out of 100 to reviews from mainstream critics, the album received an average score of 66% based on 5 reviews, indicating "generally favorable reviews".

== Track listing ==
No.	Title	Length
1.	"Utopia"	5:52
2.	"Rock On"	3:58
3.	"Arpeggio"	4:04
4.	"Minidoux"	0:56
5.	"Oh Boy"	3:45
6.	"TV Dogs (Cathodica's Letter)" (featuring Mike Ladd)	4:14
7.	"Hard Tits"	3:13
8.	"Teen Beat Ocean"	4:52
9.	"Promo"	0:21
10.	"Tropical Metal"	3:36
11.	"Headache"	4:55
12.	"Moto"	1:11
13.	"Fast Life"	5:08
14.	"Radio Caca"	20:11

== Personnel ==
Credits adapted from liner notes.

- Jackson and His Computerband – production, mixing (1, 2, 3, 4, 8, 9, 10, 11, 12, 14)
- Paula Moore – vocals (1, 2, 5, 13)
- Harper Smith – vocals (5)
- Mike Ladd – vocals (6)
- Steve Arguelles – timpani (3, 5), snare drum (3, 5)
- Tim Paris – final assistance (3)
- Quentin Dupieux – mixing (5, 7)
- Stephane 'Alf' Briat – mixing (6, 13)
- Chab – mastering
- Jean-Pierre – mastering
- Jean Sebastién – mastering assistance
- Egospray – art direction, design, photography
- Mick Jayet – photography
- John Sack – illustration, graphics
- Reach – visual assistance

== Charts ==
Chart	Peak position
French Albums (SNEP)	152
