= Welcome to the Afterfuture =

Studio album by Mike Ladd
- Released: March 7, 2000
- Genre: Hip-hop
- Length: 62:39
- Label: Ozone Music
- Producers: Mike Ladd; Fred Ones

Mike Ladd chronology
Easy Listening 4 Armageddon (1997)	Welcome to the Afterfuture (2000)	Nostalgialator (2004)

Singles from Welcome to the Afterfuture
- 1. "5000 Miles" / "Planet 10" Released: 2000

Welcome to the Afterfuture is a studio album by the American hip-hop musician Mike Ladd. It was released on Ozone Music in 2000.

== Critical reception ==
Professional ratings
Review scores
Source	Rating
AllMusic	4/5 stars
Pitchfork	8.6/10

Brian Whitener of AllMusic wrote, "Welcome to the Afterfuture is a blender of sounds and styles and epitomizes the search that is leading cutting-edge hip-hop further into avant-garde and non-Western musical traditions." Jon Caramanica of CMJ New Music Monthly commented that "Ladd's futurism is merely a mask for his very tangible discontent with the present." He added, "References to the police state permeate the album, arguing that the new world order and newspeak are more than just things weeded street-corner bards philosophize on; they're integral to maintaining the power status quo."

== Legacy ==
The album was included in the book 1001 Albums You Must Hear Before You Die.

== Track listing ==
No.	Title	Length
1.	"5000 Miles West of the Future"	3:48
2.	"Airwave Hysteria"	4:09
3.	"Planet 10"	4:25
4.	"Takes More Than 41"	3:01
5.	"Bladerunners" (featuring Company Flow)	6:17
6.	"No. 1 St."	3:52
7.	"To the Moon's Contractor"	10:36
8.	"I Feel Like $100"	3:45
9.	"The Animist"	5:52
10.	"Red Eye to Jupiter (Starship Nigga)"	3:50
11.	"Welcome to the Afterfuture"	3:34
12.	"Wipe Out on the Wave of Armageddon"	4:15
13.	"Feb. 4 '99 (For All Those Killed by Cops)"	5:15

== Personnel ==
Credits adapted from liner notes.

- Mike Ladd – vocals, bass guitar (8), synthesizer, sampler, production, programming, mixing, executive production
- Bruce Grant – tape loop
- Fred Ones – turntables (1–4, 6–13), production (4), recording (1–4, 6, 8–13), mixing (1–4, 6, 8–13)
- Jun – vocal recording (1, 4)
- El-P – vocals (5)
- Bigg Jus – vocals (5)
- Mr. Len – turntables (5)
- Vassos – recording (5), mixing (5)
- Charles Calello – keyboards (7)
- Matt Stein – recording (7), mixing (7)
- Jeff Cordero – guitar (8)
- Eric M.O. – bass guitar (10)
- Ken Heitmuller – mastering
- Prashant – art direction, design, photography
- Mark Feggins – layout assistance
- Tony Duval – photography
- Amaechi Uzoigwe – executive production
