= Talkie Walkie =

2004 studio album by Air

Studio album by Air
- Released: 26 January 2004
- Recorded: 2003
- Studios: Revolvair (Paris); Ocean Way (Hollywood) (Note: Additional recordings)
- Genres: Chill-out; ambient; space pop
- Length: 43:27
- Labels: Source; Virgin
- Producers: Air; Nigel Godrich

Air chronology
10 000 Hz Legend (2001)	Talkie Walkie (2004)	Pocket Symphony (2007)

Singles from Talkie Walkie
- 1. "Cherry Blossom Girl" Released: 16 February 2004; 2. "Surfing on a Rocket" Released: 9 April 2004; 3. "Alpha Beta Gaga" Released: 9 August 2004

Talkie Walkie is the third studio album by French electronic music duo Air, released on 26 January 2004 by Virgin Records.

== History ==
A recorded version of "Cherry Blossom Girl" featured the lead singer of the American band Mazzy Star, Hope Sandoval. "Alpha Beta Gaga" was originally recorded for use in Madonna's 2003 studio album American Life. As of November 2006, Talkie Walkie had sold 161,000 copies in the United States, according to Nielsen SoundScan. The album shipped 405,000 copies outside France within two weeks of its release, according to Virgin Records.

== Use in media ==
"Alone in Kyoto" was included on the soundtrack to the 2003 film Lost in Translation, and "Run" was used in both the Veronica Mars episode "Nobody Puts Baby in a Corner" and the 2004 French film Lila Says, and "Surfing on a Rocket" was featured in the game FIFA Football 2005.

== Critical reception ==
Professional ratings
Aggregate scores
Source	Rating
Metacritic	75/100
Review scores
Source	Rating
AllMusic	4/5 stars
Entertainment Weekly	A−
The Guardian	4/5 stars
Los Angeles Times	2/4 stars
NME	8/10
Pitchfork	8.3/10
Q	4/5 stars
Rolling Stone	3.5/5 stars
Spin	B
Uncut	4/5 stars

Talkie Walkie received generally positive reviews from music critics. At Metacritic, which assigns a normalised rating out of 100 to reviews from mainstream publications, the album received an average score of 75, based on 29 reviews. Rob Sheffield of Rolling Stone called the album "excellent" and commented that Air "return to what they do best: elegantly moody soundtrack music for imaginary films." NME reviewer Piers Martin commented, "It is light and fluffy, of course, but tender and romantic, synthetic and soulful, too. It sounds, effortlessly, new and different, fresh and focused, clean and Zen, no doubt the outcome of Godin and Dunckel's decision to play and programme all the instruments and perform all the vocals on the record themselves in Paris without any external assistance...". Praise was given to the subtle touch producer Nigel Godrich and string arranger Michel Colombier presumably brought to the album at its final stage, and the more personal and tighter songwriting.

Pitchfork named Talkie Walkie the 20th best album of 2004, and later placed it at number 191 on its list of the top 200 albums of the 2000s.

== Track listing ==
All tracks are written by Jean-Benoît Dunckel and Nicolas Godin.

No.	Title	Length
1.	"Venus"	4:04
2.	"Cherry Blossom Girl"	3:39
3.	"Run"	4:12
4.	"Universal Traveler"	4:22
5.	"Mike Mills"	4:26
6.	"Surfing on a Rocket"	3:43
7.	"Another Day"	3:20
8.	"Alpha Beta Gaga"	4:39
9.	"Biological"	6:04
10.	"Alone in Kyoto"	4:51

Japanese edition bonus track
No.	Title	Length
11.	"Easy Going Woman"	4:34

== Personnel ==
Credits adapted from the liner notes of Talkie Walkie.

=== Musicians ===
- Malik Mezzadri – flute (track 2)
- Jessica Banks – additional vocals (track 2)
- Brian Reitzell – ride cymbal (track 6)
- Jason Falkner – bass (track 6)
- Lisa Papineau – additional vocals (tracks 6, 9)
- Joey Waronker – percussion (tracks 6, 9)
- Michel Colombier – piano (track 9); string arrangements

=== Technical ===
- Air – production
- Nigel Godrich – additional recordings, production, mixing
- Darrell Thorp – mixing assistance (all tracks); street sounds recording (track 8)
- Bob Ludwig – mastering

=== Artwork ===
- Richard Prince – cover art
- Aaron Klein – technical assistance
- Claude Gassian – cover photo
- Jenna Felling – interior photos
- Marc Teissier du Cros – polaroids
- Roger Gorman – design

== Charts ==
=== Weekly charts ===
Weekly chart performance for Talkie Walkie
Chart (2004)	Peak position
Australian Albums (ARIA)	18
Austrian Albums (Ö3 Austria)	15
Belgian Albums (Ultratop Flanders)	2
Belgian Albums (Ultratop Wallonia)	9
Canadian Albums (Nielsen SoundScan)	33
Czech Albums (ČNS IFPI)	51
Danish Albums (Hitlisten)	11
Dutch Albums (Album Top 100)	17
European Albums (Billboard)	1
Finnish Albums (Suomen virallinen lista)	8
French Albums (SNEP)	3
German Albums (Offizielle Top 100)	5
Greek Albums (IFPI)	22
Irish Albums (IRMA)	1
Italian Albums (FIMI)	3
Japanese Albums (Oricon)	146
Norwegian Albums (VG-lista)	3
Polish Albums (ZPAV)	40
Portuguese Albums (AFP)	2
Scottish Albums (Official Charts)	2
Spanish Albums (PROMUSICAE)	56
Swedish Albums (Sverigetopplistan)	43
Swiss Albums (Schweizer Hitparade)	4
UK Albums (Official Charts)	2
US Billboard 200	61
US Independent Albums (Billboard)	3
US Top Dance Albums (Billboard)	2

=== Year-end charts ===
Year-end chart performance for Talkie Walkie
Chart (2004)	Position
Belgian Albums (Ultratop Flanders)	66
French Albums (SNEP)	103
UK Albums (OCC)	128
US Top Dance/Electronic Albums (Billboard)	5

== Certifications and sales ==
Certifications and sales for Talkie Walkie
Region	Certification	Certified units/sales
Denmark (IFPI Danmark)	Gold	10,000^{‡}
Ireland (IRMA)	Gold	7,500^{^}
United Kingdom (BPI)	Gold	100,000^{^}
United States	—	161,000
^{^} Shipments figures based on certification alone.^{‡} Sales+streaming figures based on certification alone.

== See also ==
Spoonerism - the type of wordplay used in the title
