= Nostalgialator =

Studio album by Mike Ladd
- Released: July 26, 2004
- Genre: Hip-hop
- Length: 38:40
- Label: Studio !K7
- Producers: Mike Ladd; Jeff Cordero; Scotty Hard

Mike Ladd chronology
| Welcome to the Afterfuture (2000) | Nostalgialator (2004) | Negrophilia: The Album (2005) |

Singles from Nostalgialator
- 1. "Wild Out Day" / "Jet Pack" Released: 2003; 2. "Housewives at Play" Released: 2004

Nostalgialator is a studio album by American hip-hop musician Mike Ladd. It was released on Studio !K7 in 2004. It was re-released on Definitive Jux in 2007.

== Critical reception ==
Professional ratings
Aggregate scores
| Source | Rating |
|---|---|
| Metacritic | 76/100 |
Review scores
| Source | Rating |
| AllMusic | 3.5/5 stars |
| Dusted Magazine | mixed |
| Exclaim! | unfavorable |
| The Guardian | 4/5 stars |
| The Phoenix | 3/4 stars |
| Pitchfork | 8.3/10 |
| PopMatters | 7/10 stars |
| XLR8R | 7/10 |

At Metacritic, which assigns a weighted average score out of 100 to reviews from mainstream critics, the album received an average score of 76, based on 5 reviews, indicating "generally favorable reviews".

Marisa Brown of AllMusic wrote, "Perhaps Nostalgialator isn't the artist's most provocative work, but his mix of indie electronica, rock, blues, punk, hip-hop, and spoken word certainly makes it one of his most interesting and fulfilling endeavors."

== Track listing ==
| No. | Title | Length |
|---|---|---|
| 1. | "Dire Straits Plays Nuremberg" | 2:23 |
| 2. | "Trouble Shot" | 3:40 |
| 3. | "Housewives at Play" | 3:09 |
| 4. | "Black Orientalist" | 3:08 |
| 5. | "Wild Out Day" | 2:55 |
| 6. | "How Electricity Really Works" | 4:07 |
| 7. | "Off to Mars?" | 4:25 |
| 8. | "Learn to Fall" | 3:24 |
| 9. | "Afrotastic" | 2:21 |
| 10. | "Nostalgialator" | 5:34 |
| 11. | "Sail Away Ladies (Traditional, After Odetta)" | 3:34 |

== Personnel ==
Credits adapted from liner notes.

- Jeff Cordero – keyboards (1, 10), guitar (10)
- Jaleel Bunton – guitar (2, 3, 5)
- Damali Young – drums (2, 3, 5)
- Vijay Iyer – keyboards (7, 11), synthesizer (8)
- Ambrose Akinmusire – trumpet (7)
- Dana Leong – trombone (7)
- Scotty Hard – guitar (11)
