= In Another Life (album) =

Studio album by Bilal
- Released: June 30, 2015
- Genre: Soul; R&B; neo soul; hip hop soul; funk; psychedelic soul
- Length: 38:28
- Label: eOne
- Producer: Adrian Younge

Bilal chronology
A Love Surreal (2013)	In Another Life (2015)	Voyage-19 (2020)

In Another Life is the fourth studio album by American singer and songwriter Bilal. It was released on June 30, 2015, by Entertainment One. Bilal recorded much of In Another Life with producer and songwriter Adrian Younge, who played most of the instruments on the album. Its cover art was designed by visual artist Angelbert Metoyer.

== Release and reception ==
Professional ratings
Aggregate scores
Source	Rating
Metacritic	78/100
Review scores
Source	Rating
AllMusic	4.5/5 stars
Consequence of Sound	C
Exclaim!	8/10
HipHopDX	3.5/5
Pitchfork	7.2/10
PopMatters	9/10
Spin	7/10
The Sydney Morning Herald	4/5 stars
Tom Hull – on the Web	B+
Uncut	7/10

In Another Life was released by Entertainment One on June 30, 2015, to generally positive reviews from critics. At Metacritic, which assigns a normalized rating out of 100 to reviews from mainstream publications, the album received an average score of 78, based on 8 reviews. Album of the Year, another aggregate website, gave it a 74 out of 100, which ranked it 11th among psychedelic soul albums featured on the website.

PopMatters critic John Paul hailed In Another Life as "a stone cold soul classic" and said it would prove to be perhaps "one of, if not the best R&B albums of the year". He applauded Bilal and Younge's retrofuturist approach to 1970s funk and soul on a wildly eclectic and "vital document from two of the most gifted, albeit idiosyncratic, performers R&B currently has to offer". AllMusic's Andy Kellman called In Another Life a hip hop soul high point and hailed Bilal as still "one of the most dynamic and progressive vocalists in contemporary music". In The Sydney Morning Herald, Paris Pompor categorized the album as neo soul while declaring the songwriting could be the best of the singer's career. Kristofer Lenz from Consequence of Sound was less impressed by the record, believing Younge's unrefined analog production had yielded mixed results. On songs such as "Star Now" and "Lunatic", "some instruments feel too high in the mix, typically the drums, and the ensuing chaos threatens to consume the rest", Lenz lamented. At the end of 2015, In Another Life was ranked number 13 on Rolling Stone magazine's list of the year's best R&B albums.

== Track listing ==
No.	Title	Writer(s)	Length
1.	"Sirens II"	Bilal Oliver, Adrian Younge, Ali Shaheed Muhammad	2:45
2.	"Star Now"	Oliver, Younge	3:10
3.	"Open Up the Door"	Oliver, Younge	3:09
4.	"I Really Don't Care"	Oliver, Younge	2:59
5.	"Pleasure Toy" (featuring Big K.R.I.T.)	Oliver, Younge, Justin Scott	4:32
6.	"Satellites"	Oliver, Younge, Loren Oden	2:58
7.	"Lunatic"	Oliver, Younge	2:42
8.	"Money Over Love" (featuring Kendrick Lamar)	Oliver, Younge, Kendrick Duckworth, Oden	2:44
9.	"Love Child"	Oliver, Younge	3:19
10.	"Holding It Back" (featuring Kimbra)	Oliver, Younge, Saudia Mills	3:27
11.	"Spiraling"	Oliver, Younge, Oden	2:59
12.	"Bury Me Next to You"	Oliver, Younge, Oden	3:43

== Personnel ==
Credits were adapted from AllMusic.

- Big K.R.I.T. – vocals
- Bilal – executive production, vocals
- Hannah Blumenfeld – cello, violin
- Danielle Brimm – A&R
- Dave Cooley – mastering
- Hans Elder – executive production
- Isabel Evans – A&R
- Paul Grosso – creative direction
- David Henderson – drums
- Davy Henderson – drums
- James Hunt – engineering
- Russell L. Johnson – executive production
- Kimbra – vocals
- Kendrick Lamar – vocals
- George Littlejohn – executive production
- Andrew Lojero – associate production
- Sean Marlowe – art direction, design
- Kawai Mathews – photography
- John McDonald – production management
- Angelbert Metoyer – cover art
- Victor Morante – production direction
- Ali Shaheed Muhammad – Fender Rhodes, Mellotron
- Loren Oden – background vocals, vocoder
- Clinton Patterson – trumpet
- Julia Sutowski – production coordination
- Jack Waterson – electric guitar, electric sitar, rhythm guitar, slide guitar
- Noah Wolf – violin
- Saudia Yasmein – vocals
- Adrian Younge – acoustic guitar, alto saxophone, baritone flute, baritone saxophone, clavinet, drums, electric bass, electric guitar, electric sitar, engineering, executive production, Fender Rhodes, flute, glockenspiel, Hammond organ, harmonica, mastering, mixing, percussion, piano, piccolo, production, slide guitar, synthesizer, tenor saxophone, vibraphone, vocoder

== Charts ==
Chart (2015)	Peak position
US Billboard 200	179
US Top R&B/Hip-Hop Albums (Billboard)	13
US Independent Albums (Billboard)	8
