= Mer du Japon =

Single by Air

from the album Pocket Symphony
- Released: 11 June 2007
- Genre: Electronic music
- Length: 3:04 (album version); 2:33 (radio edit)
- Label: Virgin
- Songwriter(s): JB Dunckel and Nicolas Godin
- Producer(s): Air; Nigel Godrich

Air singles chronology
"Once Upon a Time" (2007)	"Mer du Japon" (2007)	"Sing Sang Sung" (2009)

"Mer du Japon" is a song by the French electronic band Air and is the eighth track on their 2007 studio album Pocket Symphony. The song was released as the second single from that album on June 11, 2007. The single featured a new version of the track and a remix by The Teenagers. A radio edit of the song was released on the iTunes Store on 7 May 2007.

The title of the song is in French, which literally translates into English as "Sea of Japan".

Pitchfork named the Kris Menace remix of the song as one of their Top 100 Tracks of 2007.

== Music video ==
A music video was produced to promote the single. The video was directed by Guillaume de la Perrière, with choreography by Angelin Preljocaj.

== Track listing ==
1. "Mer du Japon" (radio edit)
2. "Mer du Japon" (remix by Kris Menace)
3. "Mer du Japon" (remix by the Teenagers)
