= Easy Listening 4 Armageddon =

Hip-hop debut album by Mike Ladd

Studio album by Mike Ladd
- Released: 1997
- Genre: Hip-hop
- Length: 51:03
- Label: Scratchie
- Producers: Mike Ladd; Dennis Kelley

Mike Ladd chronology
Easy Listening 4 Armageddon (1997)	Welcome to the Afterfuture (2000)

Easy Listening 4 Armageddon is the debut studio album by American hip-hop musician Mike Ladd. It was released on Scratchie Records in 1997.

== Critical reception ==
Professional ratings
Review scores
Source	Rating
AllMusic	4/5 stars
Chicago Tribune	3/4 stars

Dan LeRoy of AllMusic commented that "through a series of lo-fi beats and loops that make stunning use of a few choice samples, Ladd creates an eerie soundscape that perfectly matches his muttered musings." Tony Green of JazzTimes wrote, "Ignoring the all too common impulse to pile texture on top of texture, Ladd constructs 12 tracks that cajole as effectively as his richly imagistic poetry."

Greg Kot of Chicago Tribune called it "one of the most accomplished hip-hop debuts in recent years."

== Track listing ==
No.	Title	Length
1.	"Libations"	0:28
2.	"The Tragic Mulatto Is Neither"	4:18
3.	"Kissin' Kecia"	4:11
4.	"Bush League Junkie"	3:23
5.	"Padded Walls"	4:58
6.	"Back Stroke"	3:06
7.	"Blade Runner"	7:17
8.	"Maniac"	2:47
9.	"I'm Building a Bodacious Bodega for the Race War"	5:08
10.	"Off the Coast of Okrakoke"	5:28
11.	"Easy Listening for Armageddon"	4:48
12.	"The Post Apocalypse Arkestra"	5:11

== Personnel ==
Credits adapted from liner notes.

- Mike Ladd – vocals, production, arrangement, programming, synthesizer (8), mixing (9), art direction, front photography
- Bruce Grant – tape loop
- Vassos – recording (1–7, 9–12), engineering (1–7, 9–12), mixing (10)
- Dawn Norfleet – flute (2)
- Dennis Kelley – synthesizer (3, 8, 10), co-production (2, 3, 4, 6, 7, 11), mixing (1–8, 11, 12)
- Jeff Cordero – guitar (3), recording (1–7, 9–12), engineering (1–7, 9–12), mixing (1–8, 11, 12)
- Bill Green – bass guitar (8, 10)
- John Hancock – recording (8)
- Mio – piano (10)
- Mums the Schemer – vocals (12)
- Shariff Simmons – vocals (12)
- GRFX – vocals (12)
- Natasha Latasha Diggs – vocals (12)
- High Priest – vocals (12)
- Beans – vocals (12)
- Jessica Care Moore – vocals (12)
- Chris Athens – mastering
- J. Stewart – art direction, design
- Dems – bomb logo
- Bill Harris – front photography
- Maceo Bishop – back photography
