= Jackson and His Computerband =

French electronic music artist

- Born: Jackson Fourgeaud; 15 June 1976 (age 50); Paris, France
- Genres: Electro house, electronic rock, French touch
- Years active: 1996–present
- Labels: Barclay, Warp
- Website: https://warp.net/artists/91392-jackson-and-his-computerband

Jackson Fourgeaud (born 15 June 1976), known professionally as Jackson and His Computerband (earlier Jackson and His Computer Band), is a French IDM artist. He released his debut album Smash with Warp Records in 2005.

== History ==
Jackson Fourgeaud began making music at the age of 15. After his acid house debut on Pumpking records in 1996, Sound of Barclay records released the "Sense Juice" and "Gourmet" EPs under the name Jackson & His Computer Band. In 2003 his fourth single, album opener "Utopia", was released. "Utopia" and "Fast Life" feature vocals by his mother, Paula Moore (birdpaula), a folk and blues singer. Warp Records picked up on these tracks, released on French imprint Sound Of Barclay, and signed him.

"Utopia", from the album Smash, was used in the O_{2} ‘bubble’ ad campaign. "Minidoux" and "Hard Tits" from the album Smash were used in the Adult Swim "Super Violence Disclaimer" and "AcTN water Tanks" bumpers respectively. "Pump", "More" and "Seal," tracks from the Glow album, were featured in Adult Swim bumps that aired during the summer of 2016.

Smash was recorded at home and in various Paris studios. Jackson's also responsible for some of the artwork, including the inside painting. As for guests, again, his mother sings on the track "Fast Life"; his four-year-old niece narrates the tale of a mad king on "Oh Boy", which Jackson wrote.

He performed at European summer festivals in Nîmes (France), Zurich (Switzerland) and Dour Festival (Belgium). His second album Glow was released on Warp Records on 2 September 2013.

On Glow, featured artists include Natas Loves You, Planningtorock and Cosmobrown. It was mastered by Mike Marsh (at The Exchange) and mixed by the late Philippe Zdar at the Motorbass studio.

Select tracks on Glow have been remixed by the likes of The Bloody Beetroots, Boys Noize, Brodinski, Hudson Mohawke and more.

The track "Arp #1" by Jackson And His Computer Band is present on the fictional Soulwax FM Radio in Grand Theft Auto V.

== Discography ==
=== Albums ===
- Smash (2005)
- Glow (2013)

=== EPs and singles ===
- Sense Juice EP (1999)
- Gourmet EP (1999)
- Utopia EP (2003)
- Rock On (2005)
- G.I. Jane (Fill Me Up) (2013)
- Memory (2014)

=== Remixes ===
Year	Artist	Track	Title
1998	Marc Collin	"Les Kidnappeurs (Main Theme)"	Revisited By Jackson
1999	Archive	"You Make Me Feel"	Jackson Remix
1999	Ark	"Punkadelik"	Jackson Remix
1999	Femi Kuti	"Truth Don Die"	Jackson's 'Rhum Gingembre' Mix
1999	Glimpse	"Glimpse"	Jackson Boogie Remix
1999	Novo Navis	"Cyberkraft"	Jackson Remix
1999	Shalark	"In'shalark"	Jackson's Big Rush Mix
1999	Shawn Christopher	"Another Sleepless Night"	Jackson & His Computer Band Mix
2000	-M-	"Le complexe du corn flakes"	Special K
2000	Enrico Macias	"Sidi H'Bibi"	Remixed By Jackson
2000	Freeform Five	"Break Me"	Jackson's Remix
2000	Vanessa Paradis	"Commando"	Jackson's Come On Mix
2002	Jacknife Lee	"Bursting Off the Backbeat"	Jackson & Raymond Audio Remix
2003	M83	"Run Into Flowers"	Midnight Fuck Remix By Jackson
2004	Air	"Alpha Beta Gaga"	Jackson Remix
2004	Dead Combo	"You Don't Look So Good"	Jackson Remix
2006	Jean-Jacques Perrey & Luke Vibert	"Moog Acid"	Jackson Mix
2007	Justice	"D.A.N.C.E."	Jackson Remix Do the J.A.H.C.B.
2008	Panico	"Illumination"	Jackson Remix
2009	Charlotte Gainsbourg feat. Beck	"Heaven Can Wait"	Jackson Escalator Remix
2009	Kap Bambino	"Batcaves"	Jackson Remix
2010	Kavinsky	"Pacific Coast Highway"	Jackson Remix
2011	Mungo Park	"Pilgrim"	Jackson And His Computer Band Remix
2011	Planningtorock	"Living It Out"	Jackson Remix; Jackson Alternate Remix
2011	Slice & Soda	"Year of the Dragon"	Jackson Remix
2011	Treasure Fingers feat. Haley Small	"Keep Up"	Jackson Uro Trans Mix; Jackson Ejack Mix
2012	Birdy Nam Nam	"The Plan"	Jackson 'Lunatic' Remix
2012	Surkin	"White Knight Two"	Jackson & His Computer Band Reprise
2013	Jackson and His Computerband	"G.I. Jane (Fill Me Up)"	Jackson Auto Remix
2014	Glass Animals	"Pools"	Jackson and His Computer Band Remix
2014	Phoenix	"SOS In Bel Air"	Jackson and His Computer Band Remix
2014	Tahiti Boy and the Palmtree Family	"All That You Are"	Jackson And His Computerband Remix, Pt. I Jackson And His Computerband Remix, Pt. II
2016	Alain Chamfort	"J'entends Tout"	Jackson and His Computer Band Remix
2018	Telepopmusik	"Dance Me"	Jackson Remix
2021	The Avalanches	"Two Hearts in 3/4 Time"	Jackson and His Computer Band Remix
2022	Tim Paris	"Albion"	Jackson Remix
2023	Boys Noize	"Love & Validation"	Jackson Remix
