= 1995 (Screaming Headless Torsos album) =

Studio album by Screaming Headless Torsos
- Released: June 13, 1995
- Recorded: 1995
- Studio: Power Station, New York City, New York
- Genre: Jazz-funk, jazz fusion, jazz
- Label: Discovery; WEA; Fuzelicious Morsels (re-release)
- Producer: Screaming Headless Torsos, Bill Toles, Bob Brockmann

Screaming Headless Torsos chronology
1995 (1995)	Live!! (1996)

Professional ratings
Review scores
Source	Rating
Allmusic	4/5 stars
eMusic	4.5/5 stars

1995 is the debut album by experimental jazz/jazz fusion group Screaming Headless Torsos. It was recorded in 1995 and released on June 13 the same year. On March 26, 2002, the album was re-released with two new tracks, Jimi Hendrix's "Little Wing" and the Beatles "Something".

== Track listing ==
All tracks are written by David Fiuczynski, except where noted.

No.	Title	Writer(s)	Length
1.	"Vinnie"		4:24
2.	"Free Man"	Fima Ephron	4:27
3.	"Cult of the Internal Sun"		4:09
4.	"Little Wing" (Only included on the re-released version of the album)	Jimi Hendrix	4:45
5.	"Word to Herb"	Dean Bowman, Jojo Mayer	4:23
6.	"Blue in Green"	Miles Davis, Bill Evans	5:14
7.	"Chernobyl Firebirds"		0:29
8.	"Graffiti Cemetery"		7:13
9.	"Smile in a Wave" (Theme from the documentary film Jack Johnson)	Miles Davis	3:52
10.	"Wedding in Sarajevo"	Bowman, Mayer	6:24
11.	"Hope"		4:22
12.	"Kermes Macabre"		8:02
13.	"Another Sucka"	Ephron	4:31
14.	"Something" (Only included on the re-released version of the album)	George Harrison	5:09

== Release and reception ==
The reviews for the album were generally positive. Glenn Astarita from Allmusic recommended the album, writing that it was "an early glimpse of one of the most powerful jazz-rock units to emerge in quite some time." Tony Green from the JazzTimes magazine wrote that "the band's vocal-fronted, hard-charging amalgam of funk, rock and jazz should be more than a belly full for folks who haven't heard them before".

== Personnel ==
- Dean Bowman – vocals
- David Fiuczynski – guitar
- Fima Ephron – bass
- Jojo Mayer – drums
- Daniel Sadownick – percussion
