= Father Divine (album) =

Studio album by Mike Ladd
- Released: November 15, 2005
- Genre: Hip-hop
- Length: 45:17
- Label: ROIR

Mike Ladd chronology
| Negrophilia: The Album (2005) | Father Divine (2005) | Still Life with Commentator (2007) |

Father Divine is a studio album by American hip-hop musician Mike Ladd. It was released on ROIR in 2005.

== Critical reception ==
Professional ratings
Aggregate scores
| Source | Rating |
|---|---|
| Metacritic | 69/100 |
Review scores
| Source | Rating |
| AllMusic | 3.5/5 stars |
| Exclaim! | mixed |
| Pitchfork | 8.4/10 |
| PopMatters | 5/10 stars |
| XLR8R | favorable |

At Metacritic, which assigns a weighted average score out of 100 to reviews from mainstream critics, the album received an average score of 69, based on 9 reviews, indicating "generally favorable reviews".

Joe Tangari of Pitchfork gave the album an 8.4 out of 10, writing, "Like any Ladd album, Father Divine is stuffed with tracks worth talking about, and it's nice to see that Ladd isn't afraid to lay aside his conceptual tendencies in the name of just getting down and nasty, and Father Divine does just that-- it's a record played in the red, and it's not afraid to have a good time there."

== Track listing ==
| No. | Title | Length |
|---|---|---|
| 1. | "Apt. C2" | 3:08 |
| 2. | "Awful Raw" | 2:53 |
| 3. | "Crooner Island" | 5:40 |
| 4. | "Black Rambo" | 1:31 |
| 5. | "Barney's Girl" | 4:14 |
| 6. | "Little Red" | 3:25 |
| 7. | "Water Bomb" | 2:54 |
| 8. | "Ike Turner Dub" | 4:06 |
| 9. | "So 'n So" | 3:17 |
| 10. | "Just in Case" | 4:19 |
| 11. | "Murder Girl" | 4:18 |
| 12. | "The Last Sea" | 2:10 |
| 13. | "Baptism by Radio" | 3:19 |
