= Surfing on a Rocket =

Single by Air

from the album Talkie Walkie
- B-side: "Easy Going Woman"; "Sex Born Poison"; "Alpha Beta Gaga"
- Released: 9 April 2004
- Genre: Progressive pop; pop rock; electronic rock; downtempo
- Length: 3:43
- Label: Source; Virgin
- Songwriters: Jean-Benoît Dunckel; Nicolas Godin
- Producers: Air; Nigel Godrich

Air singles chronology
"Cherry Blossom Girl" (2004)	"Surfing on a Rocket" (2004)	"Alpha Beta Gaga" (2004)

Professional ratings
Review scores
Source	Rating
AllMusic	3/5 stars
PopMatters	Positive

"Surfing on a Rocket" is a song by French electronic music duo Air from their third studio album, Talkie Walkie (2004). It was released on 9 April 2004 as the album's second single and features additional vocals by singer Lisa Papineau. In the United States, "Surfing on a Rocket" was released as an EP on 19 October 2004. The track also appears on the soundtrack to the football video game FIFA Football 2005.

== Music video ==
The accompanying music video was directed by Antoine Bardou-Jacquet and Romain Guillon.

== Track listings ==
- French CD maxi single
1. "Surfing on a Rocket" (edit) – 2:41
2. "Surfing on a Rocket" (remixed by Zongamin) – 3:27
3. "Surfing on a Rocket" (remixed by Juan MacLean) – 7:01
4. "Surfing on a Rocket" (Tel Aviv Rocket Surfing Remake – remixed by Nomo Heroes) – 5:21
5. "Surfing on a Rocket" (To the Smiling Sun Remix – remixed by Joakim) – 6:31
- French 12-inch single #1

A1. "Surfing on a Rocket" (album version) – 3:42
A2. "Surfing on a Rocket" (To the Smiling Sun Remix – remixed by Joakim) – 6:31
B1. "Surfing on a Rocket" (remixed by Juan MacLean) – 7:01
B2. "Surfing on a Rocket" (Tel Aviv Rocket Surfing Remake – remixed by Nomo Heroes) – 5:21

- French 12-inch single #2

A. "Surfing on a Rocket" (Joakim remix) – 6:31
B1. "Surfing on a Rocket" (Juan MacLean remix) – 7:01
B2. Surfing on a Rocket" (original mix) – 3:42

- French DVD single
1. "Surfing on a Rocket" (music video) – 3:42
2. "Cherry Blossom Girl" (music video – director's cut) – 3:50
3. "Surfing on a Rocket" (remixed by Zongamin) (audio) – 3:27
4. "Easy Going Woman" (audio) – 4:31
5. "Sex Born Poison" (demo) (audio) – 3:11
- UK 12-inch single

A1. "Surfing on a Rocket" (album version) – 3:42
A2. "Surfing on a Rocket" (remixed by Juan MacLean) – 7:01
B1. "Surfing on a Rocket" (To the Smiling Sun Remix – remixed by Joakim) – 6:31
B2. "Surfing on a Rocket" (remixed by Zongamin) – 3:27
B3. "Surfing on a Rocket" (Tel Aviv Rocket Surfing Remake – remixed by Nomo Heroes) – 5:21

- French 7-inch single

A. "Surfing on a Rocket" (edit) – 2:41
B. "Surfing on a Rocket" (remixed by Zongamin) – 3:27

- US EP
1. "Surfing on a Rocket" (Tel Aviv Rocket Surfing Remake – remixed by Nomo Heroes) – 5:21
2. "Alpha Beta Gaga" (Mark Ronson Vocal Mix) (featuring Rhymefest) – 4:37
3. "Easy Going Woman" (previously unreleased) – 4:31
4. "Surfing on a Rocket" (remixed by Juan MacLean) – 7:01
5. "Alpha Beta Gaga" (Jackson remix) – 4:21
6. "Surfing on a Rocket" (To the Smiling Sun Remix – remixed by Joakim) – 6:31
7. "Alpha Beta Gaga" (Mark Ronson Instrumental Mix) – 3:10

== Charts ==
Chart (2004)	Peak position
France (SNEP)	100
US Hot Singles Sales (Billboard)	48
US Hot Dance Singles Sales (Billboard)	3

== Release history ==
Region	Date	Format	Label	Ref.
France	9 April 2004	CD maxi single; 12-inch single	Source; Virgin	
France	13 April 2004	DVD single	Source; Virgin	
United Kingdom	19 April 2004	12-inch single	Source; Virgin	
France	26 May 2004	7-inch single	Source; Virgin	
United States	19 October 2004	EP (CD)	Astralwerks	
