= Once Upon a Time (Air song) =

Single by Air

from the album Pocket Symphony
- B-side: "High Point"
- Released: 29 January 2007
- Length: 5:02; 3:44 (radio edit)
- Label: Virgin
- Songwriter(s): Jean-Benoît Dunckel; Nicolas Godin
- Producer(s): Air; Nigel Godrich

Air singles chronology
"Alpha Beta Gaga" (2004)	"Once Upon a Time" (2007)	"Mer du Japon" (2007)

"Once Upon a Time" is a song by French electronic music duo Air from their fourth studio album, Pocket Symphony (2007). The radio edit version of the song was released as the first single from the album in January 2007 via digital download stores. A limited edition CD single, with a production run of 700, was released in France on 12 March 2007 with the radio edit, the album version and B-side "High Point". On that same day, a 7-inch vinyl record featuring the radio edit and "High Point" was released in the United Kingdom.

== Music video ==
A music video was produced for the single. The video was directed by Mathieu Tonetti and Jonathan Lagache.

== Track listings ==
- British 7" VS1935 / 0946 3 86090 7 0
1. "Once Upon a Time" (radio edit) – 3:44
2. "High Point" – 4:02
- French Limited Edition CD 0946 3 86099 2 6
1. "Once Upon a Time" (radio edit) – 3:44
2. "Once Upon a Time" (album version) – 5:02
3. "High Point" – 4:02

== Track reviews ==
- The Downloader link
- Drowned in Sound (4/10) link
- Filter link
- MusicOMH link
