= Grand Pianoramax =

American musical group

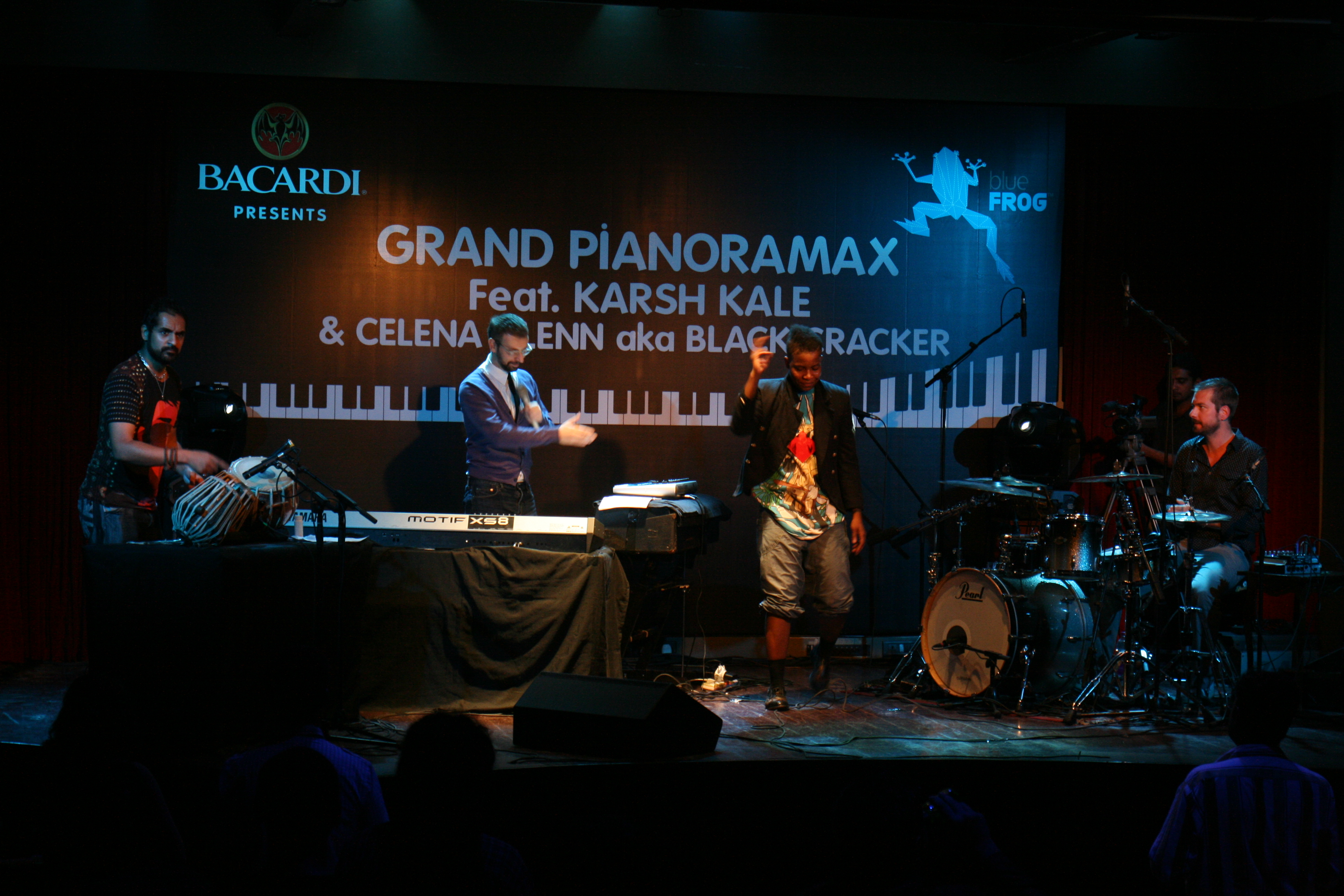
Grand Pianoramax at Blue Frog, Mumbai

Grand Pianoramax is an experimental keyboard and drums bands conceived by Leo Tardin. The band consists of Tardin and Dominik Burkhalter and features guests, often including Mike Ladd and Black Cracker.

== Biography ==
The 2005 self-titled debut album features Tardin with drummer Jojo Mayer (and two tracks with Ferenc Nemeth on drums). Grand Pianoramax's second album, The Biggest Piano in Town, employs the likes of drummers Deantoni Parks and Adam Deitch and expanded personnel to include guest vocals, raps and spoken word from Mike Ladd, Black Cracker, Invincible, and Spleen.

At the same time as the album The Biggest Piano in Town was commercially released in the U.S. and Canada, Grand Pianoramax went on a ten-city tour in the U.S. opening for Maceo Parker and then performed at festivals in Europe (most notably at a showcase night featuring the Andy Milne & Gregoire Maret duo, and Grand Pianoramax with Spleen & Bleubird at the 2008 Montreux Jazz Festival). Zurich-based Dominik Burkhalter had become the official drummer for the band.

Grand Pianoramax's third album, Smooth Danger, was recorded and mixed between Mumbai, Berlin, Paris and Bristol (and mastered by Shawn Joseph, collaborator of Portishead). It was released in Europe and the U.S. in October 2010, and featured longtime collaborators Mike Ladd, Black Cracker, and for the first time Karsh Kale on tabla.

== Leo Tardin ==
Leo Tardin, a native of Geneva, Switzerland, won the first Montreux Jazz Festival International Solo Piano Competition in 1999. He graduated from New School University in 2000 and spent ten years in New York City. He moved to Berlin in 2009 for the production of his third album.

He has performed with musicians like Roy Ayers, Frank Morgan, Toots Thielemans, Charles Tolliver, Dave Liebman, Enrico Rava, Maria João, Erik Truffaz, Gregoire Maret and Paula Oliveira.

== Discography ==
=== Studio albums ===
- Grand Pianoramax (ObliqSound, 2005)
- The Biggest Piano in Town (ObliqSound, 2008)
- Smooth Danger (ObliqSound, 2010)
- Till There's Nothing Left (ObliqSound, 2013)
- Soundwave (Mental Groove Records, 2016)

=== Singles ===
- "Starlite 12" Single" (ObliqSound, 2005)
- "The Hook (Remixes)" digital single (ObliqSound, 2008)
- "The Hook (Remixes)" 12" vinyl single (ObliqSound, 2009)
