= Glow (Jackson and His Computerband album) =

Studio album by Jackson and His Computerband
- Released: 31 August 2013
- Genres: IDM, French house
- Length: 63:27
- Label: Warp
- Producer: Jackson Fourgeaud

Jackson and His Computerband chronology
| Smash (2005) | Glow (2013) |

Professional ratings
Aggregate scores
| Source | Rating |
|---|---|
| Metacritic | 69/100 |
Review scores
| Source | Rating |
| AllMusic | 4/5 stars |
| Clash | 8/10 |
| Consequence of Sound | C− |
| The Guardian | 4/5 stars |
| Pitchfork | 4.2/10 |
| PopMatters | 6/10 stars |

Glow is the second studio album by Jackson and His Computerband. It was released via Warp on 2 September 2013 worldwide, and via Beat Records in Japan several days earlier, on 31 August 2013.

== Critical reception ==
At Metacritic, which assigns a weighted average score out of 100 to reviews from mainstream critics, the album received an average score of 69 based on 12 reviews, indicating "generally favorable reviews".

== Track listing ==
| No. | Title | Length |
|---|---|---|
| 1. | "Blow" | 4:10 |
| 2. | "Seal" | 3:59 |
| 3. | "Dead Living Things" | 4:44 |
| 4. | "G.I. Jane (Fill Me Up)" | 5:27 |
| 5. | "Orgysteria" | 6:36 |
| 6. | "Blood Bust" | 5:03 |
| 7. | "Memory" | 4:26 |
| 8. | "Arp #1" | 5:07 |
| 9. | "Pump" | 5:28 |
| 10. | "More" | 5:44 |
| 11. | "Vista" | 4:34 |
| 12. | "Billy" | 7:58 |
| Total length: | | 63:27 |

Japanese bonus track
| No. | Title | Length |
|---|---|---|
| 13. | "Junk Love Vision" | 4:15 |
| Total length: | | 67:49 |

== Personnel ==
Credits adapted from liner notes.

- Jackson Tennessee Fourgeaud – production, songwriting, composition, performer
- Sami Osta – guitar (1)
- Natas Loves You – vocals, songwriting (1, 13)
- Planningtorock – lead vocals, composition, songwriting, performer (3)
- Cosmobrown – backing vocals (4)
- Mara Carlyle – vocals, performer (5)
- Lisa Lewis - songwriting (7)
- Anna Jean – vocals (7), lead vocals, songwriting, performer (11)
- Philippe Zdar – mixing
- Mike Marsh – mastering
- Raphael Garnier – artwork
- Douglas Lee – artwork
- Marco Dosantos – photography

== Charts ==
| Chart | Peak position |
|---|---|
| Belgian Albums (Ultratop Flanders) | 148 |
| Belgian Albums (Ultratop Wallonia) | 139 |
