= Mike Ladd =

American rapper

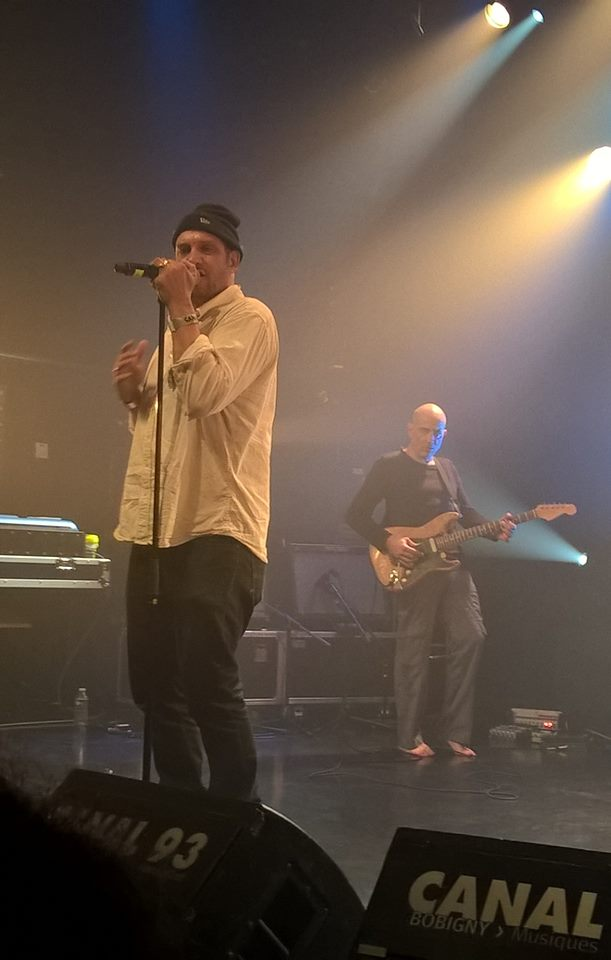
- Ladd (left) and Serge Teyssot-Gay in 2016.

Background information
- Born: Boston, Massachusetts, U.S.
- Origin: Paris, France
- Genre: Hip-hop
- Occupations: Rapper; record producer spoken word artist
- Years active: 1997–present
- Labels: Scratchie; Ozone; Likemadd; Big Dada; Definitive Jux; Studio !K7; Thirsty Ear; ROIR; Marathon of Dope

Mike Ladd is an American alternative hip-hop artist. Based in Paris, France, The Guardian once described him as "the king of the hip-hop concept."

== Early life ==
Mike Ladd was born in Boston, Massachusetts. As a child, he lived in India and Zimbabwe for a while. He graduated from Hampshire College.

== Career ==
Ladd's debut studio album, Easy Listening 4 Armageddon, was released in 1997. He released Welcome to the Afterfuture in 2000. Nostalgialator was released in 2004. In 2005, he released Negrophilia: The Album, which was inspired by Petrine Archer-Straw's book of the same name. In that year, he also released Father Divine on ROIR. He has also released several collaborative albums with jazz pianist Vijay Iyer.

== Style and influences ==
Mike Ladd's influences range from Funkadelic to King Tubby, Minor Threat, and Charles Stepney.

== Discography ==
=== Studio albums ===
- Easy Listening 4 Armageddon (1997)
- Welcome to the Afterfuture (2000)
- Gun Hill Road (2000) (as The Infesticons)
- Beauty Party (2003) (as The Majesticons)
- In What Language? (2003) (with Vijay Iyer)
- Nostalgialator (2004)
- Negrophilia: The Album (2005)
- Father Divine (2005)
- Still Life with Commentator (2007) (with Vijay Iyer)
- Maison Hantée (2008) (with Alexandre Pierrepont)
- Anarchist Republic of Bzzz (2009) (as Anarchist Republic of Bzzz)
- Bedford Park (2010) (as The Infesticons)
- Why Waste Time (2012) (as Sleeping in Vilna)
- Holding It Down: The Veterans' Dreams Project (2013) (with Vijay Iyer)
- Gain (2016) (with Jeff Parker, High Priest, and Tyshawn Sorey, as Illtet)
- Epiphany (2017) (with Mankwe Ndosi, Sylvain Kassap, and Dana Hall)
- La chose commune (2017) (with Emmanuel Bex, David Lescot, Elise Caron, Géraldine Laurent, and Simon Goubert)
- Visions of Selam (2018) (with Arat Kilo and Mamani Keita)
- The Dead Can Rap (2020)
- Transatlantic (2023) (with David Sztanke Soundtrack from the Netflix Series)
- EXILLIANS (2023) (with MIKE LADD, T.I.E, JUICE ALEEM)

=== Live albums ===
- Live from Paris (2000)

=== EPs ===
- Vernacular Homicide (2001)
- Kids and Animals (2011)

=== Singles ===
- "Blah Blah" (1998)
- "5000 Miles" / "Planet 10" (2000)
- "Activator Cowboy" (2001)
- "Wild Out Day" / "Jet Pack" (2003)
- "Housewives at Play" (2004)
- "Shake It" (2004)

=== Guest appearances ===
- Youngblood Brass Band - "Peace" from Unlearn (2000)
- Mr. Flash - "Basementized Soul" from Le Voyage Fantastique (2001)
- Thawfor - "Where Thawght Is Worshipped 2.2" from Where Thawght Is Worshiped (2001)
- The Opus - "Where Thawght Is Worshipped 3.0" from 0.0.0. (2002)
- Terranova - "Sublime" and "Heroes" from Hitchhiking Non-Stop with No Particular Destination (2002)
- Emmanuel Santarromana - "Les Halles" from Métropolitain (2003)
- Huge Voodoo - "NYPD Blues" from Affordable Magic (2003)
- Sonic Sum - "Films" from Films (2004)
- Jackson and His Computerband - "TV Dogs (Cathodica's Letter)" from Smash (2005)
- Daedelus - "Welcome Home" from Exquisite Corpse (2005)
- Stacs of Stamina - "Baghdad Boogie" from Tivoli (2005)
- Blue Sky Black Death - "Long Division" from A Heap of Broken Images (2006)
- Coldcut - "Everything Is Under Control" from Sound Mirrors (2006)
- Soylent Green - "Eating People" from Software and Hardwar (2006)
- dDamage - "Alphabet & Burners" from Shimmy Shimmy Blade (2006)
- Mister Modo & Ugly Mac Beer - "Machiavelli vs. Lao Tseu" and "Machiavelli vs. Lao Tseu (Remix)" from Mo' Dougly Weird Stories (2007)
- Apollo Heights - "Missed Again" from Disco Lights (2007)
- Grand Pianoramax - "Showdown" from The Biggest Piano in Town (2008)
- Arsenal - "Turn Me Loose" from Lotuk (2008)
- Solex vs. Cristina Martinez & Jon Spencer - "R Is for Ring-A-Ding" and "Action" from Amsterdam Throwdown King Street Showdown! (2009)
- Mister Modo & Ugly Mac Beer with Jessica Fitoussi - "Dirty Finders" from Modonut (2009)
- DJ Spooky - "Known Unknowns" from The Secret Song (2009)
- U-God - "Lipton" from Dopium (2009)
- Mister Modo & Ugly Mac Beer - "Norman Bates" from Remi Domost (2010)
- Walker Barnard - "Ooty on Wax" and "Ooty on Wax (Iron Curtis Remix)" from Alacazam (2011)
- Grand Pianoramax - "Domestic Bliss" from Smooth Danger (2011)
- Birdapres - "Not the Only Man" from Catch an L (2011)
- Busdriver - "Electric Blue" from Beaus$Eros (2012)
- Mister Modo & Ugly Mac Beer - "Life at the 9th" from Modonut 2 (2012)
- Roberto Fonseca - "Mi Negra Ave Maria" from Yo (2012)
- Ben Muller - "The Last One to Preach" (2013)
- Mister Modo & Ugly Mac Beer - "Wild Gun Mike" from Modonut Invasion (2013)
- Dr. John - "Mack the Knife" from Ske-Dat-De-Dat: The Spirit of Satch (2014)
- Nevche - "Rendez-Nous L'Argent" from Rétroviseur (2014)
- Uncommon Nasa - "Black Hole" from Written at Night (2017)
- R.A.P. Ferreira - "An Idea Is a Work of Art" from Purple Moonlight Pages (2020)
- Billy Woods - "Christine" from Aethiopes (2022)

=== Remixes ===
- Enrico Macias - "Le Vent Du Sud (Mike Ladd Remix)" from Enrico Experience (2000)
- Yo La Tengo - "Nuclear War (Version 4)" (2002)
- Antipop Consortium - "Ghostlawns (Mike Ladd Mix)" (2002)
- Yameen - "Spirit Walker (Mike Ladd Remix)" from Never Knows More (2009)
