= Sing Sang Sung =

Single by Air

from the album Love 2
- Released: 28 September 2009
- Genre: Neo psychedelia
- Length: 3:08 (album version)
- Label: Virgin
- Songwriters: Nicolas Godin; Jean-Benoît Dunckel
- Producer: Air

Air singles chronology
"Mer du Japon" (2007)	"Sing Sang Sung" (2009)	"So Light Is Her Footfall" (2009)

"Sing Sang Sung" is a song by the French duo Air. It is the most successful song on their 2009 studio album Love 2. It was released as a single from that album on 25 August 2009.

== Music video ==
An animated music video was produced to promote the single, which depicts a ball rolling around a world that was called reminiscent of a level in a Sonic the Hedgehog video game. The video was directed by Petra Mrkyz and François Moriceau.

== Critical reception ==
Amrit Singh of Stereogum called it "nice" and wrote that "whatever joy 'Do the Joy' lacked comes through many times over in Air's infectious Love 2 single". Scott Plagenhoef of Pitchfork felt that it works "better in the context" of Love 2, "where it serves as a breath of fresh air" as it is "one of the lightest, most agile moments on a more bottom-heavy record".

== Charts ==
Chart performance for "Sing Sang Sung"
Chart (2009)	Peak position
Belgium (Ultratip Bubbling Under Wallonia)	22
