= Cherry Blossom Girl =

Single by Air

from the album Talkie Walkie
- B-side: "Fanny"
- Released: 16 February 2004
- Genre: Downtempo; pop; psychedelia
- Length: 3:39
- Label: Source; Virgin
- Songwriter(s): Jean-Benoît Dunckel; Nicolas Godin
- Producer(s): Air; Nigel Godrich

Air singles chronology
"All I Need" (1998)	"Cherry Blossom Girl" (2004)	"Surfing on a Rocket" (2004)

"Cherry Blossom Girl" is a song by French electronic music duo Air. It was released in February 2004 by Virgin Records as the first single from their third studio album, Talkie Walkie (2004).

== Background ==
The song was recorded in 2003, and became the album's second track. Written in C-sharp minor, it opens up with bowed vibraphone, drum machines and fingerpicked acoustic guitar, which are soon joined by synthesizers and flute.

The lyrics are sung by Jean-Benoît Dunckel and Jessica Banks. Banks is the lead singer of the English synth-pop band Chungking, a group that Air were 'big fans' of. As a result, she was invited to sing the song in their recording studio in Paris.

An alternate version was recorded with Hope Sandoval of Mazzy Star, which appeared on the 7" vinyl and CD single releases. Air saw the band play in Paris and were inspired to write 'the slowest Air song ever,' later composing Cherry Blossom Girl with her in mind.

== Music video ==
The music video was directed by adult film director Kris Kramski.

== Track listing ==
7" vinyl and CD

1. "Cherry Blossom Girl (Radio Mix)" – 3:43
2. "Cherry Blossom Girl (Hope Sandoval Version)" – 2:53

12" vinyl

1. "Cherry Blossom Girl (Radio Mix)" – 3:43
2. "Cherry Blossom Girl (Simian Mobile Disco Mix)" – 5:54
3. "Fanny (CBG demo)" – 3:11

French CD maxi single

1. "Cherry Blossom Girl (Radio Mix)" – 3:43
2. "Cherry Blossom Girl (Simian Mobile Disco Mix)" – 5:54
3. "Cherry Blossom Girl (Danny Krivit Dub Remix)" – ?:??
4. "Fanny (CBG Demo)" – 3:11

EU/U.S. CD maxi single

1. "Cherry Blossom Girl (Radio Mix)" – 3:43
2. "Cherry Blossom Girl (Hope Sandoval Version)" – 2:53
3. "Cherry Blossom Girl (Simian Mobile Disco Mix)" – 5:54
4. "Fanny (CBG Demo)" – 3:11

== Charts ==
Chart performance for "Cherry Blossom Girl"
Chart (2004)	Peak position
Belgium (Ultratip Bubbling Under Flanders)	15
Belgium (Ultratip Bubbling Under Wallonia)	17
Finland (Suomen virallinen lista)	13
France (SNEP)	80
Germany (GfK)	80
Greece (IFPI)	39
Italy (FIMI)	23
Netherlands (Single Top 100)	90
UK Singles (OCC)	174
US Dance Singles Sales (Billboard)	6
US Hot Singles Sales (Billboard)	73
