= Wayne Gilbert (artist) =

American painter (1946–2023)

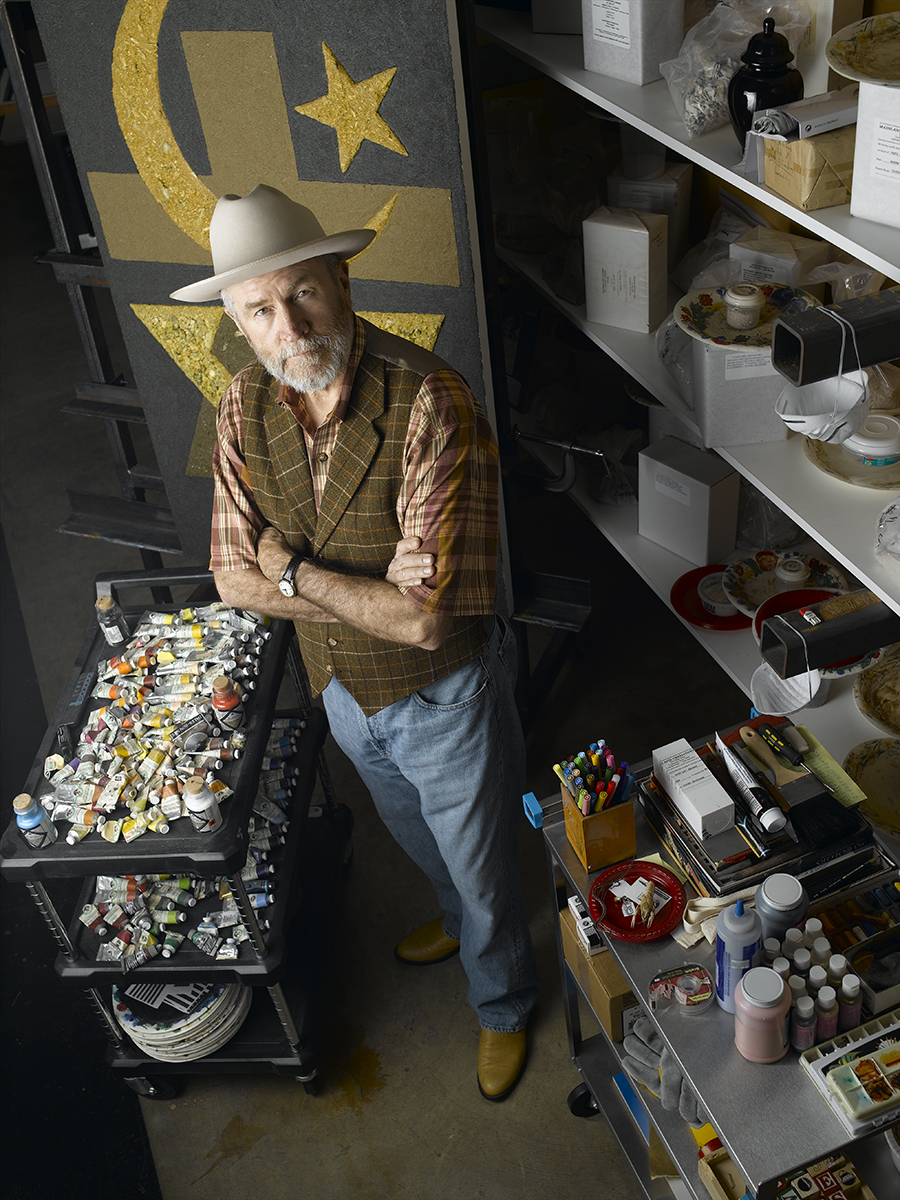
- Wayne Gilbert
- Born: Wayne Dale Gilbert; November 26, 1946; Denver, Colorado, U.S.
- Died: August 17, 2023 (aged 76); Houston, Texas, U.S.
- Education: University of Houston
- Known for: Painting
- Website: https://www.waynegilbert.com

Wayne Dale Gilbert (November 26, 1946 – August 17, 2023) was an American painter and gallerist who lived and worked in Houston, Texas. He was best known for creating paintings using unclaimed, cremated human remains. His life and work were featured in the film “Ash: The Art of Wayne Gilbert,” a documentary directed by filmmaker Wayne Slaten.

Gilbert was born in Denver, Colorado and raised in Houston, Texas. His father was a carpenter, and his mother was a punch-card operator. After graduating from Stephen F. Austin High School, Gilbert worked as an oil field supplies salesman. His interest in art was sparked in the late 1970s when his wife, Beverley, persuaded him to enroll with her in a class at the Houston Museum District home of artist Chester Snowden.

Gilbert attended the University of Houston, earning a Bachelor of Arts in painting in 1984. He described his early work as “'Absurd Expressionism,' focused on humanity at its ugliest, inspired by subjects such as the Jonestown Massacre.” Gilbert later studied at Rice University, earning a Master of Arts in Liberal Arts in 2012.

In addition to creating art, Gilbert ran G Spot Contemporary Gallery in The Heights neighborhood in central Houston and was a partner in DigitalImaging Group, a Houston-based animation studio.

Gilbert died of cancer in Houston, Texas, on August 17, 2023, at the age of 76.

== Painting with Cremains ==
For Gilbert, the idea of using cremated human remains in his art originated after the death of his uncle.

Gilbert contacted funeral homes to locate unclaimed cremains. He had to search for six months to locate the first funerary ashes he used in a work of art. For his cremains works, he mixed the ashes with resin – occasionally adding pigment – to incorporate them into his pieces.

A film called “Ash: The Art of Wayne Gilbert” documents his work and premiered at the 2017 Houston Cinema Arts Festival at the Museum of Fine Arts, Houston.

== Exhibitions ==
- 2023 Tomorrow's Unknown, Redbud Arts Center, Houston, Texas
- 2022 Wayne Gilbert: The Classic Cremain Paintings, Bill Arning Exhibitions, Houston, Texas
- 2022 Wayne Gilbert: The End of the Road, Outsider Art Fair, New York, New York
- 2015 Degrees of Separation, Station Museum of Contemporary Art, Houston, Texas
- 2013 Human Remains Paintings, 14 Pews, Houston, Texas
- 2007 Blind Philosophy, Art League of Houston, Houston, Texas
- 2007 Amistad - Texas Art in Peru, Museo de la Nación, Lima, Peru (group show)
- 2006 After Life (When the Dust Settles), Gallery 68, Austin, Texas
- 2006 Contemporary Art Houston, Shanghai Art Museum, Shanghai, China (group show)
- 2005 Danse Macabre, Megnet Gallery, Beaumont, Texas
- 1996 Houston-Area Exhibition, Blaffer Art Museum, Houston, Texas (juried group show)
- 1991 The Big Show '91, Lawndale Art Center, Glassell School of Art, Museum of Fine Arts, Houston (juried group show) - Merit Prize
