= Alpha Beta Gaga =

Single by Air

from the album Talkie Walkie
- Released: 9 August 2004
- Genre: Electronica
- Label: Source; Virgin
- Songwriter(s): Jean-Benoît Dunckel; Nicolas Godin
- Producer(s): Air; Nigel Godrich

Air singles chronology
"Surfing on a Rocket" (2004)	"Alpha Beta Gaga" (2004)	"Once Upon a Time" (2007)

"Alpha Beta Gaga" is a song by French electronic music duo Air from their third studio album, Talkie Walkie (2004). It was released on 9 August 2004 as the album's third and final single.

It features acoustic guitar, synthesisers, shamisen, a string section, and a prominent whistling melody. It was rumoured to have been one of the songs Air offered to Madonna to record for her 2003 album American Life after she asked them tentatively to work with her on it.

== Music video ==
A music video was produced to promote the single. The video was directed by Mathieu Tonetti.

== References in popular culture ==
It is used as the introduction to episode one of season two of American TV series Castle. The theme was also the signature tune of the Spanish cultural program "Miradas 2", which was broadcast by the public channel "La 2" (Radiotelevisión Española -RTVE-) until 2013.

== Track listings ==
- CD single (VSCDX1880)
1. "Alpha Beta Gaga" (edit)
2. "Alpha Beta Gaga" (Rhymefest vs Mark Ronson remix)
3. "Alpha Beta Gaga" (Mark Ronson dub)
4. "Alpha Beta Gaga" (Jackson remix)
- 12-inch single (VST1880)
1. "Alpha Beta Gaga" (edit)
2. "Alpha Beta Gaga" (Jackson remix)
3. "Alpha Beta Gaga" (Rhymefest vs Mark Ronson remix)
4. "Alpha Beta Gaga" (Mark Ronson dub)

== Charts ==
Chart (2004)	Peak position
Netherlands (Single Top 100)	98
Scotland (OCC)	52
UK Singles (OCC)	44
