= Petrine Archer-Straw =

British artist, curator and art historian (1956–2012)

- Born: 26 December 1956; Birmingham, England
- Died: 5 December 2012 (aged 55); Mona, Jamaica
- Education: University of the West Indies; Jamaican School of Art; Courtauld Institute of Art
- Occupations: Curator and art historian
- Website: petrinearcher.com

Petrine Archer-Straw (26 December 1956 – 5 December 2012) was a British artist, art historian, and curator who specialised in the art of the Caribbean people. In the words of Eddie Chambers: "In her work as an artist, academic, art historian, writer and curator, Archer-Straw consistently challenged the prevailing orthodoxies that treat Caribbean artists and cultural practice in geographical, racial and artistic isolation. In essence, her position was that we cannot fully understand or appreciate the practice of Caribbean artists without due consideration of broader factors such as migration, history, identity and, above all diaspora – the scattering of many black people beyond their ancestral homeland of Africa."

== Early life ==
Petrine Archer-Straw was born in Birmingham, England, to Jamaican parents, and was raised during the 1960s in an atmosphere of "... racial pride, and activism". Her father arrived in England in 1955 as a linotype press operator and subsequently sent for his family to join him. Archer-Straw notes that her home was a hub for the community. These were extremely formative experiences for the young Archer-Straw, who also recalls how she "would do the rounds [on Sunday] with my father, .... joining in house to house campaigning and, in the summer, attending the numerous rallies and protest marches. However, this community work eventually drew the ire of the right-wing British National Front and the family subsequently moved to Jamaica in the early 1970s, where Archer-Straw finished high school and started university.

== Education ==
Archer-Straw earned a theology, history, sociology B.A. degree at the University of the West Indies (1975–78) and later earned a cultural history M.Phil. (1983–87) at the same institution. She was also trained as an artist at the Jamaican School of Art (Diploma, painting, 1979–82). She received degrees from the Courtauld Institute at the University of London, where she earned an M.A. in art history and a PhD (art history modern, Negrophilia, 1994–95).

== Academic career ==
Archer-Straw published numerous books and catalogues, including Eugene Palmer (October 1993, in collaboration with Jane Norrie), New World Imagery (October 1995), Negrophilia: Avant-Garde Paris and Black Culture in the 1920s (November 2000), Fifty Years, Fifty Artists (May 2001), and Back to Black: Art, Cinema and the Racial Imaginary (June 2005, in collaboration with David A. Bailey, and Richard J. Powell). Additionally, she taught at the Courtauld Institute at the University of London (lecturer, 1994–95), served as the first Head of Art History at the Edna Manley College of the Visual and Performing Arts in Jamaica (2002–05), and served as a postdoctoral research fellow (2005–06) and visiting lecturer (from 2006) at Cornell University in Ithaca, New York. She completed a two-year residency as a faculty guest in the Telluride House at Cornell. She taught the Caribbean Dialogs Live! course at TASP 2008 (Telluride Association Summer Program) with Professor Petrina Dacres.

== Negrophilia ==
Archer-Straw's book Negrophilia: Avant-Garde Paris and Black Culture in the 1920s focused on the fashion for African artefacts, themes and emblems in Paris of the 1920s, including figures such as Josephine Baker. The book inspired a jazz album by Mike Ladd, Negrophilia: The Album (2005), on Thirsty Ear. The album's lyrics combine references to the milieu that Archer-Straw defines with references to the civil rights struggle in the US and more recent pop music; Pitchfork said: "its best moments are stellar and exhilarating" and scored it 7.2/10.

== Curator ==
In addition to her academic work, Dr Archer-Straw was a consultant for the development of the National Art Gallery of the Bahamas, and also curated numerous exhibits mainly related to Caribbean art and Jamaican art, including:

- October Gallery, London: Home and Away: 7 Jamaican Artists (1994–95)
- Royal Academy of Art, London: Africa: The Art of a Continent (1994–95)
- Hayward Gallery, South Bank Centre: New World Imagery: Contemporary Jamaican Art (1995–96)
- The British Council: Photos and Phantasms: Harry Johnston’s Photographs of the Caribbean (1997–98)
- National Art Gallery of the Bahamas: One Man's Vision: The Vincent D'Aguilar Collection (2000)
- National Art Gallery of the Bahamas: Past, Present, Personal: The Dawn Davies Collection (2002)
- College Art Gallery, EMCVPA: Fifty Years-Fifty Artists (2003–04)
- College Art Gallery, cage[e], EMCVPA: The Vivian Virtue Collection (2005)

== Death ==
Petrine Archer-Straw died unexpectedly, aged 55, on 5 December 2012 at UWI Hospital as the result of a sickle-cell crisis.
