= Jojo Mayer =

Swiss drummer (born 1963)

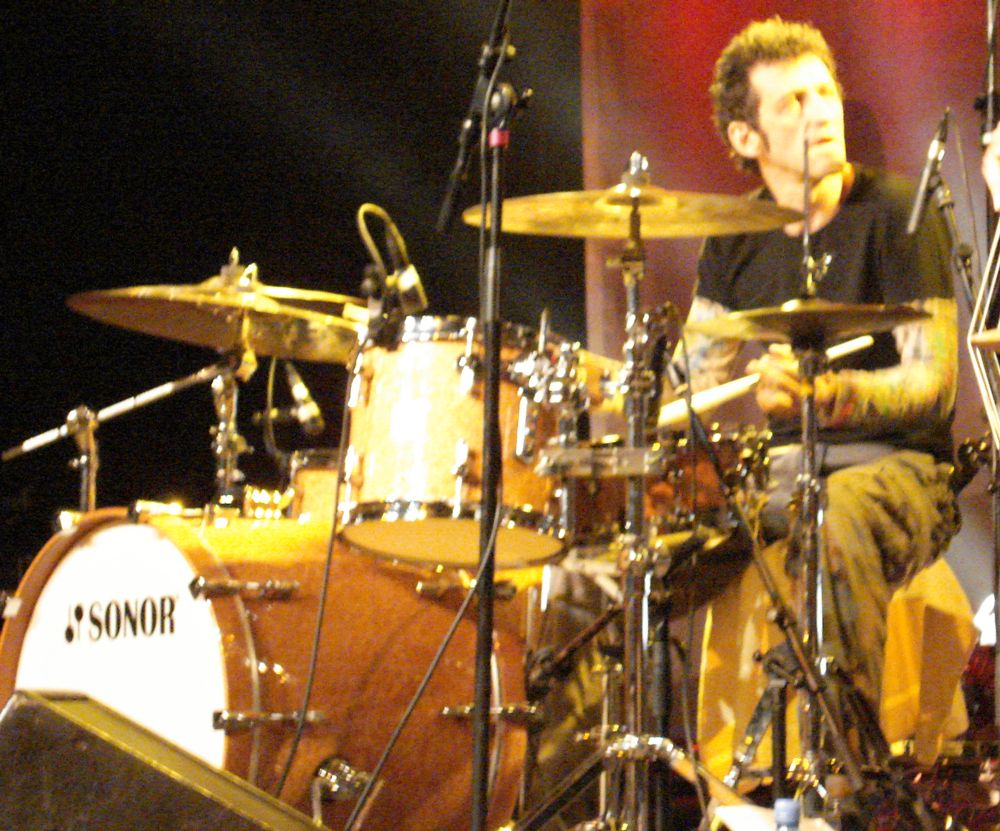

Background information
- Born: 18 January 1963 (age 63); Zurich, Switzerland
- Genres: Drum and bass, jazz rock, jungle, fusion rock, livetronica
- Occupation: Musician
- Instrument: Drums
- Years active: 1981–present
- Website: www.jojomayer.com

Sergé "Jojo" Mayer (born 18 January 1963) is a Swiss drummer born in Zürich and currently residing in New York City.

Mayer is the son of touring musician and bass player Vali Mayer and the brother of actress Delia Mayer. He began his career as a drummer at an early age, receiving his first drum set at the age of two. Having taught himself throughout his childhood, he broke out into the professional music scene at the age of 18, joining the Monty Alexander group. Touring with the group launched him into the major jazz music scene, and he has played at the North Sea Jazz Festival, Montreux, Nice, and Athens etc., which culminated with his gigging with jazz-greats such as Dizzy Gillespie and Nina Simone. Eventually, after playing with a great variety of artists, Mayer moved away from jazz and into Drum 'n' Bass.

Jojo Mayer is known for bringing together jazz, drum and bass, jungle, and other influences. He is also famous for his ability to play the rhythms of programmed jungle drum 'n' bass music on acoustic drums, terming this technique "reverse engineering", a phrase borrowed from computing. He executes this approach using various methods such as the heel-toe bass drum technique, the Moeller stroke, the Valving technique, and the "pull-out" or "push-pull" accent which takes the beat on the rebound. Using these techniques, he can play beats at astonishing speeds. A few of his main influences are Tony Williams, Jack DeJohnette and Buddy Rich.

In 2020, during the COVID-19 pandemic, Mayer launched the solo project called ME/MACHINE, which he has described as his response to the implications of generative and algorithmic technologies in music.

He is the leader of live electronica quartet Nerve, which he founded in 1997.

He played with the guitarist David Fiuczynski in the avant-garde jazz rock band Screaming Headless Torsos and in the fusion jazz band, Intergalactic Maiden Ballet.

He ran the popular Prohibited Beatz live electronica party in NYC from 1996–2001.

== Discography ==
With Intergalactic Maiden Ballet:

- 1992 - Square Dance
- 1994 - Gulf

With John Medeski:

- 1994 - Lunar Crush

With Screaming Headless Torsos:

- 1995 - Screaming Headless Torsos

With Harry Sokal:

- 1996 - Rave the Jazz! :live:

Sulfur:

- 1998 - Delirium Tremens

With Leo Tardin

- 2005 - Grand Pianoramax

With Janek Gwizdala:

- 2004 - Mystery To Me - Live in New York
- 2010 - The Space in Between
- 2011 - Live at the Jamboree June 17th 2011 1st set
- 2011 - Live at the Jamboree June 17th 2011 2nd set
- 2011 - Live at the Jamboree June 18th 2011 1st set
- 2011 - Live at the Jamboree June 18th 2011 2nd set
- 2012 - It Only Happens Once
- 2025 - Found

With Depart

- 1987 - Depart
- 2006 - Reloaded
- 2008 - Mountain Messenger

With Rebekka Bakken

- 2009 - Art of How to Fall

With Trace Elements

- 2015 - Electric Job (Live in Teramo)

Nerve (Jojo Mayer, John Davis, Jacob Bergson):

- 2007 - Prohibited Beatz
- 2010 - EP1
- 2010 - EP2
- 2011 - EP3
- 2011 - The Distance Between Zero And One
- 2012 - EP4
- 2014 - EP5
- 2015 - Live in Europe
- 2015 - Ghosts of Tomorrow
- 2016 - Vocal Collaborations
- 2017 - Nerve
- 2018 - After the Flare
- 2019 - Lunar Tribute
- 2019 - Music for Sharks

DVDs:

- 2007 - Secret Weapons for the Modern Drummer: part 1
- 2014 - Secret Weapons for the Modern Drummer: part 2

== Media ==
He was featured as the cover story of the January 2008 issue of Modern Drummer magazine. Jojo Mayer was interviewed by DrummerConnection.com in May 2010, and by Linus Wyrsch on "The Jazz Hole" for breakthruradio.com in July 2010.

== Gear ==
Mayer is a long-time Sonor endorser who also uses Sabian cymbals, Vic Firth sticks and Evans Drumheads. He helped Sonor design the Jungle kit and snare. He has also collaborated with Sabian to create three lines of cymbals: the Vault "Fierce" series, the "Omni" series, which includes both AAX and HHX models, and the HHX "Anthology" series. His Vault Fierce cymbals feature a raw, unlathed finish, and extensive hand hammering, while the Omnis are designed to function as both rides and crashes. He also helped to develop the hoop crash of Sabian and the perfect balance (single pedal of Sonor).

== Personal life ==
Mayer has stated he likes to listen to Bach, Mozart, Duke Ellington, John Coltrane, Hendrix, Aphex Twin, Angine de Poitrine, Pink Floyd, Alice Cooper and fito y los fitipaldis
