= Celtic Woman (album) =

Studio album by Celtic Woman
- Released: 1 March 2005
- Recorded: September 2004
- Genres: Celtic, new-age, world
- Languages: English, Irish, Latin, Italian
- Label: Manhattan
- Producer: David Downes

Celtic Woman chronology
Celtic Woman (2005)	Celtic Woman: A Christmas Celebration (2006)

Celtic Woman is the debut album released by the group Celtic Woman.

== Background ==
The group first featured on a musical special of the same name on American television broadcaster PBS, which filmed the group's concert at the Helix Theatre in Dublin, Ireland in September 2004 and broadcast it in March 2005 in the United States. With the help of the special, which was later made available on DVD, the group reached number one on the Billboard World Music charts within weeks of their debut, and remained there for a record eighty-six weeks. This success led the group's composer and musical director, David Downes, to adopt the title of "Celtic Woman" as their permanent name. Although originally intended as a one-time-only event, the group's music was so warmly received by the public that they immediately followed up with their first concert tour in the United States and Japan.

The album and special feature vocalists Chloë Agnew, Órla Fallon, Lisa Kelly, Méav Ní Mhaolchatha, and fiddler Máiréad Nesbitt, all of whom had never previously performed together prior to the group's formation.

== Track listing ==
No.	Title	Writer(s)	Performer(s)	Length
1.	"Last Rose of Summer (Intro) / Walking in the Air"	Traditional (arranged by David Downes), Howard Blake	Chloë Agnew	04:22
2.	"May It Be"	Enya, Roma Ryan, Nicky Ryan	Lisa Kelly	03:47
3.	"Isle of Innisfree"	Dick Farrelly	Órla Fallon	03:28
4.	"Danny Boy"	Frederic Weatherly	Méav Ní Mhaolchatha	03:26
5.	"One World"	David Downes, Shay Healy	Agnew, Fallon, Kelly, Ní Mhaolchatha	03:50
6.	"Ave Maria"	Johann Sebastian Bach, Charles Gounod	Agnew	02:56
7.	"Send Me a Song"	David Downes, Caítriona Ní Dhubhghaill	Kelly	04:23
8.	"Siúil a Rún (Walk My Love)"	Traditional (arranged by David Downes)	Fallon	03:17
9.	"Orinoco Flow"	Enya, Roma Ryan, Nicky Ryan	Fallon, Kelly, Ní Mhaolchatha	03:32
10.	"Someday"	Alan Menken, Stephen Schwartz	Agnew	04:22
11.	"She Moved Thru' the Fair"	Traditional (arranged by David Downes)	Ní Mhaolchatha	03:31
12.	"Nella Fantasia"	Ennio Morricone, Chiara Ferraú	Agnew	03:42
13.	"The Butterfly"	Traditional (arranged by David Downes and Máiréad Nesbitt)	Máiréad Nesbitt	03:02
14.	"Harry's Game"	Moya Brennan, Ciarán Brennan	Fallon	02:32
15.	"The Soft Goodbye"	David Downes, David Agnew, Caítriona Ní Dhubhghaill, Barry McCrea	Agnew, Kelly, Ní Mhaolchatha	03:59
16.	"You Raise Me Up"	Brendan Graham, Rolf Løvland	Kelly, Nesbitt	04:34
17.	"The Ashoken Farewell / The Contradiction" (Bonus live track)	Traditional (arranged by David Downes and Máiréad Nesbitt)	Nesbitt	04:10
18.	"Sí do Mhaimeo Í (The Wealthy Widow)" (Bonus live track)	Traditional (arranged by David Downes and Méav Ní Mhaolchatha)	Nesbitt, Ní Mhaolchatha	02:17

Japanese bonus tracks
No.	Title	Writer(s)	Performer(s)	Length
19.	"Jesu, Joy of Man's Desiring" (Live)	Traditional (arranged by David Downes)	Agnew, Fallon, Nesbitt, Ní Mhaolchatha	04:24
20.	"I Dreamt I Dwelt in Marble Halls" (Live)	Michael William Balfe, Alfred Bunn	Ní Mhaolchatha	03:38

DVD
No.	Title	Writer(s)	Performer(s)	Length
1.	"Last Rose of Summer (Intro)/Walking in the Air"	Traditional (arranged by David Downes), Howard Blake	Chloë Agnew	04:22
2.	"Danny Boy"	Frederic Weatherly	Méav Ní Mhaolchatha	03:26
3.	"The Butterfly"	Traditional (arranged by David Downes and Máiréad Nesbitt)	Máiréad Nesbitt	03:02
4.	"Siúil a Rún (Walk My Love)"	Traditional (arranged by David Downes)	Órla Fallon	03:17
5.	"Jesu, Joy of Man's Desiring"	Traditional (arranged by David Downes)	Agnew, Fallon, Nesbitt, Ní Mhaolchatha	04:24
6.	"May it Be" (from The Lord of the Rings: The Fellowship of the Ring)	Enya, Roma Ryan, Nicky Ryan	Lisa Kelly	03:47
7.	"Isle of Innisfree" (from The Quiet Man)	Dick Farrelly	Fallon	03:28
8.	"Ave Maria"	Johann Sebastian Bach, Charles Gounod	Agnew, Fallon	02:56
9.	"Sí do Mhaimeo Í (The Wealthy Widow)"	Traditional (arranged by David Downes and Méav Ní Mhaolchatha)	Nesbitt, Ní Mhaolchatha	02:17
10.	"My Lagan Love"	Traditional (arranged by David Downes)	Nesbitt	02:02
11.	"Somewhere" (from West Side Story)	Leonard Bernstein, Stephen Sondheim	Agnew, Fallon, Kelly, Ní Mhaolchatha	02:03
12.	"The Soft Goodbye"	David Downes, David Agnew, Caítriona Ní Dhubhghaill, Barry McCrea	Agnew, Kelly, Ní Mhaolchatha	03:59
13.	"She Moved Thru' the Fair"	Traditional (arranged by David Downes)	Ní Mhaolchatha	03:31
14.	"Send Me a Song"	David Downes, Caítriona Ní Dhubhghaill	Kelly	04:23
15.	"Someday" (from The Hunchback of Notre Dame)	Alan Menken, Stephen Schwartz	Agnew	04:30
16.	"I Dreamt I Dwelt in Marble Halls"	Michael William Balfe, Alfred Bunn	Ní Mhaolchatha	03:38
17.	"Orinoco Flow"	Enya, Roma Ryan, Nicky Ryan	Fallon, Kelly, Ní Mhaolchatha	04:00
18.	"The Ashoken Farewell / The Contradiction"	Traditional (arranged by David Downes and Máiréad Nesbitt)	Nesbitt	05:20
19.	"Harry's Game" (from Harry's Game)	Moya Brennan, Ciarán Brennan	Fallon	02:42
20.	"Nella Fantasia"	Ennio Morricone, Chiara Ferraú	Agnew	04:00
21.	"One World"	David Downes, Shay Healy	Agnew, Fallon, Kelly, Ní Mhaolchatha	03:50
22.	"You Raise Me Up"	Brendan Graham, Rolf Løvland	Agnew, Fallon, Kelly, Nesbitt, Ní Mhaolchatha	04:34

== Personnel ==
Note: All information from liner notes.

Celtic Woman

- Chloë Agnew - vocals
- Órla Fallon - vocals, harp
- Lisa Kelly - vocals
- Máiréad Nesbitt - fiddle
- Méav Ní Mhaolchatha - vocals

Musicians

- David Downes - keyboards (1, 5, 8–9), piano (7, 13, 15–17), celesta (10), harpsichord (12), whistle (1, 7), low whistle (15)
- David Agnew - oboe (12)
- Andrew Boland - percussion (13)
- Robbie Casserly - bodhrán (17), percussion (5, 8–9, 11, 13, 15–16, 18)
- Ray Fean - bodhrán (17), percussion (5, 8–9, 11, 13, 15–16, 18)
- Martin Johnson - solo cello
- Andrea Malir - harp (6)
- Des Moore - guitar (5, 8, 10, 12, 15–16)
- John O'Brien - uilleann pipes (9, 16), low whistle (14)
- Eoghan O'Neill - bass guitar (1, 5, 7–11, 13, 15–16)

The Irish Film Orchestra

- John Page - conductor (1–3, 5, 7–12, 14–16)
- David Downes - arrangements, orchestrations (1–3, 5, 7–12, 14–16)

Aontas Choral Ensemble

- Rosemary Collier - director (2, 4–5, 8–11, 14–16, 18)
- Conor O'Reilly - arrangements (4)

== Charts ==
=== Weekly charts ===
Chart (2005–06)	Peak position
Australian Albums (ARIA Charts)	55
Austrian Albums (Ö3 Austria)	74
Belgian Albums (Ultratop Flanders)	11
Belgian Albums (Ultratop Wallonia)	69
Dutch Albums (Album Top 100)	29
French Albums (SNEP)	144
German Albums (Offizielle Top 100)	20
New Zealand Albums (RMNZ)	20
Portuguese Albums (AFP)	16
Spanish Albums (Promusicae)	15
Swiss Albums (Schweizer Hitparade)	27
US Billboard 200	53
US World Albums (Billboard)	1

=== Year-end charts ===
Chart (2006)	Position
Belgian Albums (Ultratop Flanders)	93

== Certifications ==
Region	Certification	Certified units/sales
Australia (ARIA)	2× Platinum	30,000^{^}
Germany (BVMI)	Gold	100,000^{‡}
Ireland (IRMA)	Gold	7,500^{^}
Japan (RIAJ)	Platinum	250,000^{^}
United States (RIAA)	Platinum	1,029,000
^{^} Shipments figures based on certification alone.^{‡} Sales+streaming figures based on certification alone.
