= If You Ever Fall in Love Again =

Song
- Language: English
- Published: 1940s
- Released: 1940s
- Songwriter(s): Dick Farrelly
- Composer(s): Dick Farrelly

Sheet music cover for the song "If You Ever Fall in Love Again" recorded by Anne Shelton. It was Dick Farrelly's first success as a songwriter in 1948.

"If You Ever Fall in Love Again" is a song written by Irish songwriter Dick Farrelly.

== Origins and recordings ==
In 1948, it was the winning song in a BBC-hosted song contest in Northern Ireland and was subsequently recorded by Anne Shelton for whom it became a United Kingdom hit.

It was also recorded by the Guy Lombardo and His Royal Canadians orchestra and the vocal group The Three Suns in the United States.

The song was later recorded on the Farrelly tribute album Legacy of a Quiet Man (2001) by Irish singer Sinead Stone and musician Gerard Farrelly (Dick's son).

== Publisher ==
The song is published by Andic Songs/MCPS.

== Farrelly's other works ==
Farrelly's most-successful song is the "Isle of Innisfree", a worldwide hit for Bing Crosby in 1952 and main theme of the comedy-drama romance film, The Quiet Man (1952). His other compositions include, "We Dreamed our Dreams", "Cottage by the Lee", "Annaghdown", "The Gypsy Maiden", "Man of the Road" and "The Rose of Slievenamon".
