= List of UK Country Albums Chart number ones of 2009 =

These are the Official Charts Company's UK Country Albums Chart number ones of 2009. The chart week runs from Friday to Thursday with the chart-date given as the following Thursday. Chart positions are based the multi-metric consumption of country music in the United Kingdom, blending traditional album sales, track equivalent albums, and streaming equivalent albums. The chart contains 20 positions.

In the iteration of the chart dated 4 January, Daniel O'Donnell remained at number one for the tenth consecutive week with his album Country Boy and retained this position for the first five weeks of the year. He was displaced by the self-titled debut album by Taylor Swift, which finally reached the top spot after originally being released in 2006. Eagles then spent one week at the chart peak with Long Road Out of Eden, the 41st and final week of its tenure at number one. Swift returned for a further three weeks at the top spot before replacing herself with her sophomore album Fearless, which went on to remain there for 33 consecutive weeks. O'Donnell's follow-up Peace in the Valley then spent the remaining nine weeks of 2009 at number one.

== Chart history ==
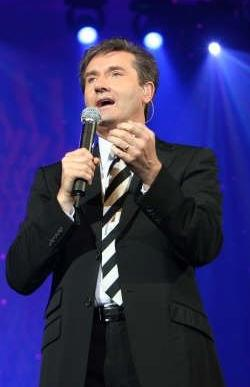
Country Boy and Peace in the Valley by Daniel O'Donnell held the top spot for a combined 14 weeks.

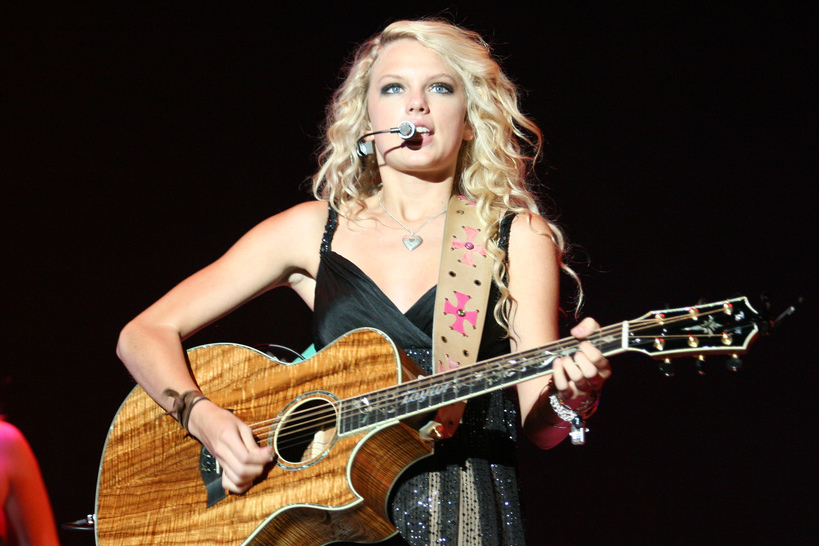
Taylor Swift spent a total of 37 weeks at number one in 2009 with her self-tited and Fearless albums.

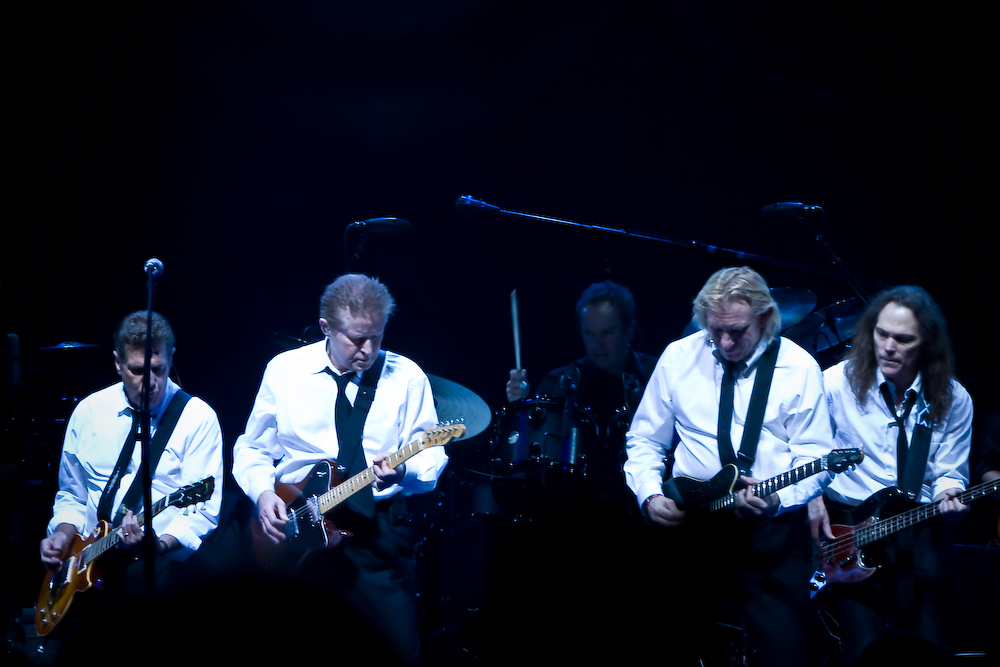
The Eagles' final studio release Long Road Out of Eden was number one for a single week in 2009, its 41st overall at the chart peak.

Issue date	Album	Artist(s)	Record label	Ref.
3 January	Country Boy	Daniel O'Donnell	DMG TV	
11 January	Country Boy	Daniel O'Donnell	DMG TV	
18 January	Country Boy	Daniel O'Donnell	DMG TV	
25 January	Country Boy	Daniel O'Donnell	DMG TV	
1 February	Country Boy	Daniel O'Donnell	DMG TV	
8 February	Taylor Swift	Taylor Swift	Big Machine	
15 February	Long Road Out of Eden	Eagles	Polydor	
22 February	Taylor Swift	Taylor Swift	Big Machine	
1 March	Taylor Swift	Taylor Swift	Big Machine	
8 March	Taylor Swift	Taylor Swift	Big Machine	
15 March	Fearless	Taylor Swift	Big Machine	
22 March	Fearless	Taylor Swift	Big Machine	
29 March	Fearless	Taylor Swift	Big Machine	
5 April	Fearless	Taylor Swift	Big Machine	
12 April	Fearless	Taylor Swift	Big Machine	
19 April	Fearless	Taylor Swift	Big Machine	
26 April	Fearless	Taylor Swift	Big Machine	
3 May	Fearless	Taylor Swift	Big Machine	
10 May	Fearless	Taylor Swift	Big Machine	
17 May	Fearless	Taylor Swift	Big Machine	
24 May	Fearless	Taylor Swift	Big Machine	
31 May	Fearless	Taylor Swift	Big Machine	
7 June	Fearless	Taylor Swift	Big Machine	
14 June	Fearless	Taylor Swift	Big Machine	
21 June	Fearless	Taylor Swift	Big Machine	
28 June	Fearless	Taylor Swift	Big Machine	
5 July	Fearless	Taylor Swift	Big Machine	
12 July	Fearless	Taylor Swift	Big Machine	
19 July	Fearless	Taylor Swift	Big Machine	
26 July	Fearless	Taylor Swift	Big Machine	
2 August	Fearless	Taylor Swift	Big Machine	
9 August	Fearless	Taylor Swift	Big Machine	
16 August	Fearless	Taylor Swift	Big Machine	
23 August	Fearless	Taylor Swift	Big Machine	
30 August	Fearless	Taylor Swift	Big Machine	
6 September	Fearless	Taylor Swift	Big Machine	
13 September	Fearless	Taylor Swift	Big Machine	
20 September	Fearless	Taylor Swift	Big Machine	
27 September	Fearless	Taylor Swift	Big Machine	
4 October	Fearless	Taylor Swift	Big Machine	
11 October	Fearless	Taylor Swift	Big Machine	
18 October	Fearless	Taylor Swift	Big Machine	
25 October	Fearless	Taylor Swift	Big Machine	
1 November	Peace in the Valley	Daniel O'Donnell	DMG TV	
8 November	Peace in the Valley	Daniel O'Donnell	DMG TV	
15 November	Peace in the Valley	Daniel O'Donnell	DMG TV	
22 November	Peace in the Valley	Daniel O'Donnell	DMG TV	
29 November	Peace in the Valley	Daniel O'Donnell	DMG TV	
6 December	Peace in the Valley	Daniel O'Donnell	DMG TV	
13 December	Peace in the Valley	Daniel O'Donnell	DMG TV	
20 December	Peace in the Valley	Daniel O'Donnell	DMG TV	
27 December	Peace in the Valley	Daniel O'Donnell	DMG TV	

== Most weeks at number one ==
Weeks at number one	Artist
37	Taylor Swift
14	Daniel O'Donnell

== See also ==
- List of UK Albums Chart number ones of 2009
- List of UK Dance Singles Chart number ones of 2009
- List of UK Album Downloads Chart number ones of 2009
- List of UK Independent Albums Chart number ones of 2009
- List of UK R&B Albums Chart number ones of 2009
- List of UK Rock & Metal Albums Chart number ones of 2009
- List of UK Compilation Chart number ones of the 2000s
