= Anne Shelton (singer) =

English singer (1923–1994)

Anne Shelton OBE
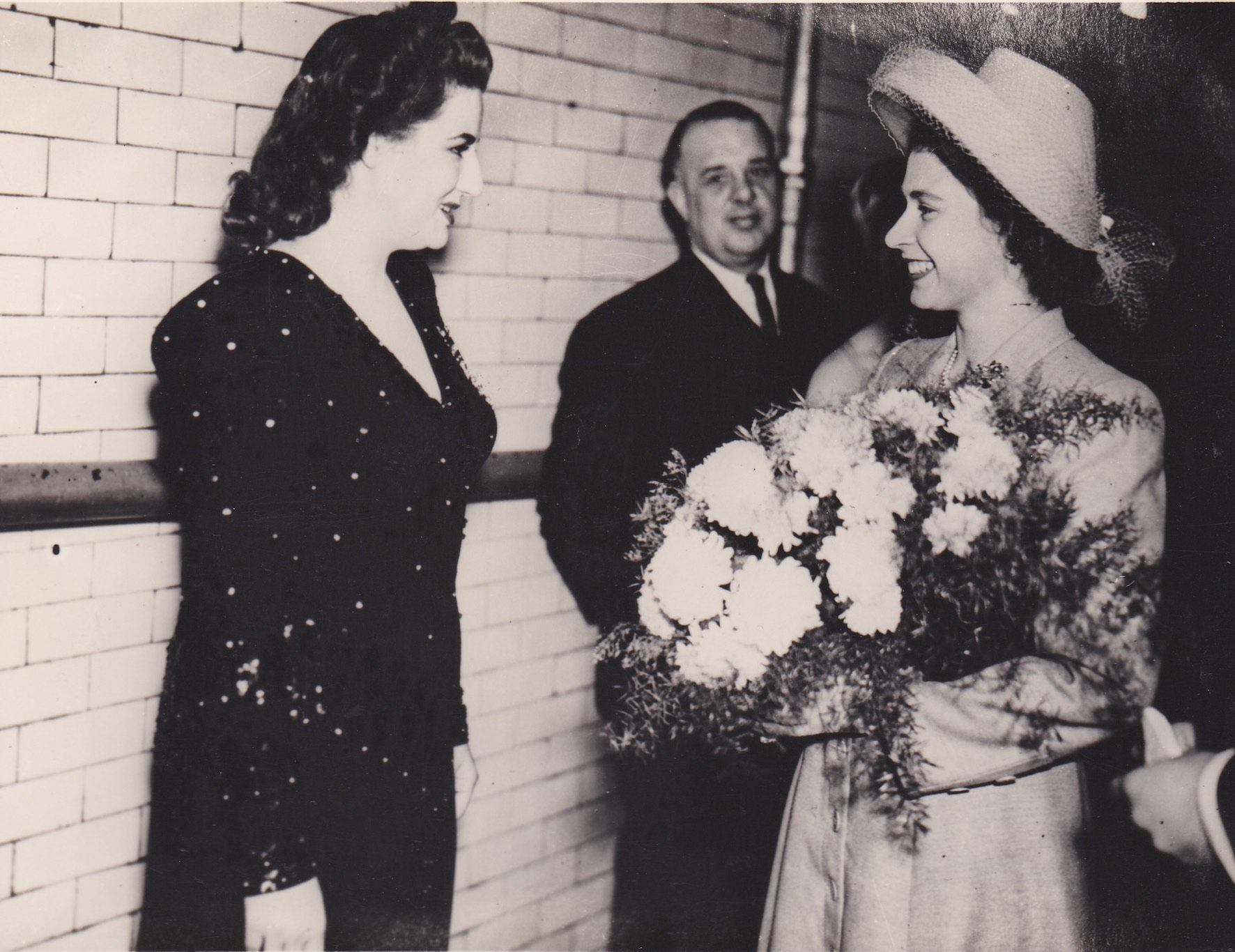
- Anne Shelton being presented to Queen Elizabeth II in 1953

Background information
- Born: Patricia Jacqueline Sibley; 10 November 1923; Dulwich, London, England
- Died: 31 July 1994 (aged 70) Herstmonceux, Sussex, England
- Occupation: Singer
- Instrument: Vocals
- Years active: 1940–1994

Anne Shelton (born Patricia Jacqueline Sibley; 10 November 1923 – 31 July 1994) was a popular English vocalist, who is remembered for providing inspirational songs for soldiers both on radio broadcasts, and in person, at British military bases during the Second World War. During the 1950s and 60s, Shelton had success on the UK Singles Chart, topping the listings in 1956 with "Lay Down Your Arms".

== Early life ==
Shelton was born on 10 November 1923 in Dulwich, South London.

== Singing career ==
In May 1940 at age 16, she appeared on the BBC talent radio show Monday Night at Eight and sang "Let the Curtain Come Down". The British dance band leader Bert Ambrose heard her performance, and signed her to sing with his orchestra. She made her first broadcast with Ambrose in June 1940 and she soon made her first solo record for Rex Records, "I Can't Love You Any More", backed with "Fools Rush In (Where Angels Fear to Tread)". In January 1941 she commenced weekly radio broadcasts with Jack Payne and his orchestra.

Shelton performed at military bases in Britain during World War II. Her radio programme, Calling Malta, was broadcast from 1942 to 1947. In 1944, she was invited by Glenn Miller to sing in France with him and his orchestra. She declined because of prior commitments. Miller died during this tour when his plane crashed. Shelton appeared with Bing Crosby on the Variety Bandbox radio programme and they sang "Easter Parade" together. In 1948 she recorded "If You Ever Fall in Love Again", written by Irish songwriter Dick Farrelly, who is best remembered for his song "Isle of Innisfree", which Shelton also recorded. Her songs "Galway Bay" and "Be Mine" were popular in the United States in 1949, and she toured there in 1951. Shelton was also the original British singer of the Lale Andersen German love-song "Lili Marlene".

She had a No.1 hit song in 1956 in the UK with "Lay Down Your Arms", engineered by Joe Meek.

She also had a Top 10 hit in 1961 with her cover version of "Sailor". In the same year she participated in BBC Television's A Song for Europe contest, the UK qualifying heat for the Eurovision Song Contest. Her entry, "I Will Light a Candle", was placed fourth. Shelton made another attempt at Eurovision in 1963 with "My Continental Love", and came fourth again. In addition to her hits "Lay Down Your Arms" and "Sailor", she also charted with in the late 1950s with "Seven Days" and "The Village of St. Bernadette". In 1967 she covered the song, "It Won't Be Long 'Til Christmas" which was originally to be featured in the Walt Disney feature film musical The Happiest Millionaire, but was deleted from the final cut of the film. Shelton's versions of the song have since been featured on several compilations.

In 1958–59 she starred in The Anne Shelton Show (ATV, 11 episodes). This was followed in 1961 by Ask Anne (BBC TV, 11 episodes.)

As well as singing and recording, Shelton appeared in several films, including Miss London Ltd. (1943), King Arthur Was a Gentleman, and Bees in Paradise (1943),

Shelton appeared in three Royal Variety Performances, 1953, 1959 and 1978. On occasion in her career, she was accompanied by her sister, Jo Shelton, also an accomplished and popular singer. She made an appearance on a 1973 episode of The Benny Hill Show, when she sang "Put Your Hand in the Hand", a biblically inspired tune by the group Ocean that was a 1971 hit in the US. Shelton changed the words of one verse to describe briefly her father's positive influence on her family when she was growing up.

She continued to perform at charity and anniversary concerts almost until her death on 31 July 1994. Numerous compilation albums of her work have been released, including Early Years: Lili Marlene and At Last: The Very Best.

== Honours ==
In 1990, she was appointed OBE for her work with the "Not Forgotten Association", a charitable organisation for disabled former service personnel from all wars. Shelton's Dulwich residence at 142 Court Lane was awarded a Blue Plaque by Southwark London Borough Council in 2007.

== Personal life ==
Shelton was married to David Reid, a lieutenant commander in the Royal Navy, from 1958 until he died in 1990.

She died in Herstmonceux, Sussex, on 31 July 1994, of a heart attack.

== Discography ==
=== Chart singles ===
| Year | Single | Chart Positions | |
| Year | Single | US | UK |
|---|---|---|---|
| 1949 | "Be Mine" | 25 | – |
| 1949 | "Galway Bay" | 27 | – |
| 1955 | "Arrivederci Darling" | – | 17 |
| 1956 | "Seven Days" | – | 20 |
| 1956 | "Lay Down Your Arms" | 59 | 1 |
| 1959 | "The Village of St. Bernadette" | – | 27 |
| 1961 | "Sailor" | – | 10 |
