= Cottage by the Lee =

Song written by Dick Farrelly

1950s sheet music front cover of "Cottage by the Lee"

"Cottage by the Lee" is a song written by Irish songwriter Dick Farrelly. It was composed in the early 1950s and is published by Waltons Music Publishing in Dublin, Ireland.

The song was originally recorded on the Waltons Glenside record label by the Irish tenor and actor Joe Lynch for whom it became a hit. "Cottage by the Lee" was one of the most featured songs for many years on the Waltons music programme which always finished with one of the most remembered sentences in Irish music - "And remember, if you feel like singing, do sing an Irish song".

Dick Farrelly is best remembered for his song, "Isle of Innisfree" which was a worldwide hit for Bing Crosby in 1952, and was also chosen by director John Ford as the main theme music for his film, The Quiet Man.

== Other recordings ==
Some of the artists who have recorded "Cottage by the Lee" include:

- Daniel O'Donnell on Moon Over Ireland (2011)
- Sinead Stone & Gerard Farrelly (Dick's son) on Legacy of a Quiet Man, an album of Dick Farrelly songs.
- Larry Cunningham, Glen Curtin, Joe Cuddy, Diarmuid O'Leary & The Bards, Bridie Gallagher, Jimmy Crowley, Donie Carroll.
