= Beautiful Meath =

Single by Mary Duff
- Released: 1987
- Genre: Country, Irish
- Length: 3:43
- Label: Green Grass Music
- Songwriter(s): Derek Nelson

Music video
- "Beautiful Meath" on YouTube

"Beautiful Meath" is a song by Irish country singer Mary Duff, released as her debut single in 1987. The song was adapted from an original folk song written by Derek Nelson entitled "Oh Beautiful Meath" and gained prominence after Duff's recording. It has since been recorded by several artists including Derek McCormack, Jim Finnegan, boxcar Brian and Marie O'Brien.

The song is sometimes used as the anthem of County Meath, particularly in the context of Gaelic football.
