= Songs from the Movies and More =

Studio album by Daniel O'Donnell
- Released: November 2012
- Recorded: 2012
- Genre: Easy-listening
- Label: Rosette Records

Daniel O'Donnell chronology
Moon Over Ireland (2011)	Songs from the Movies and More (2012)

Songs from the Movies and More is the 32nd studio album released by Irish singer Daniel O'Donnell in 2012. It contained cover versions of the singer's favourite songs from several Hollywood movies. The album helped O'Donnell make chart history in the UK, by becoming the first singer to have a different album featured in the Top 40 of the UK Albums Chart each year for the last 25 years.

== Track listing ==
1. "Somewhere My Love"
2. "Raindrops Keep Fallin' on My Head"
3. "That's Amore"
4. "Black Hills of Dakota"
5. "South of the Border"
6. "Cowboy's Lament"
7. "Que Sera, Sera"
8. "A White Sport Coat"
9. "Home on the Range"
10. "Don't Fence Me In"
11. "Cool Water"
12. "Red River Valley"
13. "A Little Bitty Tear"
14. "Edelweiss"
15. "Singin' in the Rain"
16. "We'll Meet Again"

== Charts ==
Chart (2012)	Peak position
Australia (ARIA Charts)	60
UK Albums Chart	7
