= Hibernia (album) =

Studio album by Máiréad Nesbitt
- Released: 9 December 2016
- Recorded: 2016
- Studio: Windmill Lane Studios, Soundscape Studio
- Genre: Celtic, world, classical, Instrumental
- Language: English, Irish
- Label: Cosmic Trigger
- Producer: Colm Ó Foghlú, Máiréad Nesbitt

Máiréad Nesbitt chronology
| Raining Up (2001) | Hibernia (2016) |

Hibernia is the second solo album by Irish violinist Mairead Nesbitt. The album was recorded in 2016 at Windmill Lane Studios and Soundscape Studio in Dublin, Ireland, following Nesbitt's leave from Celtic Woman. It was produced by Nesbitt and Colm Ó Foghlú.

The album is predominantly instrumental, featuring Nesbitt playing violin with the backing of an orchestra. Some of the tracks include percussive dancing. The track "To Bring Them Home" is the only track to feature vocals. The tracks are a blend of traditional Irish and classical styles "inspired by the music and dance from the southern province of Munster."

== Track listing ==
| No. | Title | Length |
|---|---|---|
| 1. | "Hallowed Fire" | 2:50 |
| 2. | "The First Sheaf" | 1:49 |
| 3. | "Becoming" | 2:45 |
| 4. | "Seán Ó Duibhir An Ghleanna" | 4:03 |
| 5. | "The Ballydesmond Polkas" | 2:56 |
| 6. | "Belles of Tipperary / The Star of Munster" | 2:34 |
| 7. | "Merrily Kiss the Quaker / Denis Murphy's Slide" | 2:28 |
| 8. | "To Bring Them Home" | 5:18 |
| 9. | "Captain H" | 2:52 |
| 10. | "Bovaglies Plaid" | 4:29 |
| 11. | "The Butterfly" | 2:57 |
| 12. | "There Is No Night" | 4:09 |
| 13. | "The Dusk" | 4:07 |
| 14. | "The Dark" | 3:13 |
| 15. | "The Dawn" | 4:54 |
| Total length: | | 51:43 |

Notes

Some of the album tracks were grouped into suites:

- Invasion Suite: tracks 1–3
- Hibernia Suite: tracks 4–7
- Raining Up Suite: tracks 9–11
- The Dusk & The Dark & The Dawn Suite: tracks 13–15

== Personnel ==
Per the liner notes.

- Máiréad Nesbitt – violin, composer
- Colm Ó Foghlú – composer, mastering
- Karl Nesbitt – trumpet, low whistle, bouzouki, didjeridoo
- Mick O'Brien – ulleann pipes, whistle
- Kathleen Nesbitt – fiddle
- John Nesbitt – accordion
- Seán Nesbitt – accordion
- Nathan Pacheco – vocal
- Noel Eccles – percussion
- Nick Bailey – percussion
- Brian Masterson – engineering
- Carolin Nesbitt (Willow Studio) – artwork
- Lili Forberg – photography

Cashel Set Dancers

- Gráinne Uí Chaomhánaigh
- Áine Cody
- Bernie Sullivan
- Coleman Lydon

The Orchestra of Ireland

- Kenneth Rice – leader
- Liam Bates – conductor

== Charts ==
| Chart (2016–18) | Peak position |
|---|---|
| US World Albums (Billboard) | 4 |
| US Top Classical Albums (Billboard) | 11 |
