= Kanniks Kannikeswaran =

Indian-born American musician

- Born: Chennai, Tamil Nadu
- Other names: Kanniks
- Citizenship: United States
- Occupations: Musician, composer, scholar
- Notable work: Shanti Oratario, Vismaya

Krishnamurtha Kannikeswaran, known as Kanniks, is an Indian-born American musician, composer, writer, and music educator based in Cincinnati, Ohio. His work includes musical productions, choral performances, lectures, and workshops.

== Education ==
In 1984, Kannikeswaran graduated from IIT Madras with a bachelor’s degree in Metallurgical Engineering. Later, in 1986, Kanniks received a master’s degree in Material Engineering from the University of Cincinnati, followed by an MBA from the same school in 1988. He later resumed his education and earned a doctorate in Indian Music from the University of Madras in 2014.

== Career ==
In late 1993, Kannikeswaran founded the Greater Cincinnati Indian Community Choir and in 1994, produced his first work, "Basant - a Musical Celebration of Spring". Kanniks has assembled and led Indian American choirs in 10 cities in the United States. He has presented lecture-demonstrations on the music of Dikshithar at the Music Academy in Chennai, Tamil Nadu. His articles on music have appeared in online forums, and he has contributed music columns to newspapers.

His collaboration with the Gundecha Brothers produced "Guruguha Dhruvapada" - a dhrupad, a concert featuring Kritis of Dikshitar rendered in the classical dhrupad style. He has also worked with the Cincinnati Chamber Orchestra and the Cincinnati Symphony Orchestra. Kanniks has also collaborated with the Korzo theater. He has been an adjunct faculty member of musicology at the College-Conservatory of Music, University of Cincinnati, since 1994.

== Research ==
=== The Indo-Colonial Music of Dikshitar ===
Kannikeswaran conducted research on the Indo-Colonial Music of Dikshitar and the Nottusvara Sahityas. In December 2007, Kanniks presented a lecture-demonstration on this topic at the Music Academy Madras. In 2008, he released the first recording of the Nottusvara Sahityas in the voice of his daughter Vidita Kanniks with western (largely Celtic) orchestration. This recording, titled "Vismaya - An Indo-Celtic Musical Journey", was released both in India and in the United States.

Kannikeswaran presented his work at the annual meetings of the Society for Ethnomusicology in 2012, 2014, and 2015.

In April 2009, Kannikeswaran performed thematic programs on Indo-Colonial Music of Dikshitar for India’s former president Dr. Abdul Kalam and India's former ambassador to the US, Meera Shankar.

He has delivered talks, lecture-demonstrations, and articles on this topic throughout North America, including Berklee College of Music, the University of Cincinnati, Texas A&M University, and at the Media Rise Festival in Washington D.C. He has lectured internationally in Singapore (National University of Singapore), Trinidad, and India (Bangalore International Center, IIT Madras, and more).

=== Dikshitar and dhrupad ===
Kannikeswaran has researched various aspects of Dikshitar's music, particularly the similarity between Dikshitar's compositions and Dhrupad. He collaborated with the Gundecha brothers to present "Meditative Moments: Guruguha-Dhruvapada", a concert highlighting Dikshitar's compositions that showed similarities to Dhrupad, in Houston (2012) and Cincinnati (June 2014). He has published numerous articles and conducted lecture-demonstrations on this topic.
