= Legacy of a Quiet Man =

Studio album by Sinead Stone & Gerard Farrelly
- Released: September 2001
- Recorded: 2001
- Genre: Celtic / Folk / Irish
- Label: Seolta Records

Legacy of a Quiet Man is a music album by Irish singer Sinead Stone and musician Gerard Farrelly. The album was released in 2001 on the Seolta Records label and is a collection of songs written by Gerard’s father Dick Farrelly. Dick is best remembered for his composition, The Isle of Innisfree which became a worldwide hit for Bing Crosby and was used as the theme music of the film, The Quiet Man, starring John Wayne and Maureen O'Hara.

The album features some of Farrelly's best known songs along with songs recorded here for the first time; they include two songs written in Irish, "Siobhán" and "Seolta Bána".

The album’s musical style is Celtic / Folk / Irish

== Track listing ==
1. "Seolta Bána" – 3:21
2. "Isle of Innisfree" – 3:53
3. "Annaghdown" – 3:25
4. "People like You and Me" – 2:36
5. "If You Ever Fall in Love Again" – 2:55
6. "When Today is Yesterday" – 3:21
7. "Shores of Loch Leven" – 3:05
8. "We Dreamed our Dreams" – 4:43
9. "Cottage by the Lee" – 3:21
10. "The Gypsy Maiden" – 3:24
11. "Black is the Colour" (Bonus track) – 4:02
12. "Siobhán" – 3:23

== Personnel ==
- Sinead Stone – Vocals
- Gerard Farrelly – Piano, Rhodes Piano, Keyboards & Percussion
- Mick McCarney – Acoustic Guitar
- Richard M.Farrelly – Acoustic Guitar
- Brendan Monaghan – Uilleann pipes, Whistle & Bodhrán
- Colum Sands – Acoustic Guitar
- Shaun Sweeney – Accordion

== Production ==
- Producers: Sinead Stone & Gerard Farrelly
- Engineer: Billy Robinson
- Recorded at: Sinead and Gerard’s home in Dublin and in Billy’s home in Ramelton, Donegal
- "The Gypsy Maiden" recorded at Spring Recording Studios, Co Down, engineered by Colum Sands
- Concept / Design & Layout: Gerard Farrelly & Sinead Stone
