= O Holy Night (disambiguation) =

O Holy Night is a Christmas carol composed by Adolphe Adam in 1847.

O Holy Night may also refer to:

- O Holy Night, a 1976 album by Luciano Pavarotti
- O Holy Night (John Berry album), 1995
- O' Holy Night (Daniel O'Donnell album), 2010
- O Holy Night (Jackie Evancho EP), 2010
