= Together Again (Daniel O'Donnell album) =

Studio album by Daniel O'Donnell/Mary Duff
- Released: 2007
- Recorded: 2006/2007
- Genre: Irish folk Country
- Label: Rosette Records

Daniel O'Donnell/Mary Duff chronology
Until the Next Time (2006)	Together Again (2007)	Country Boy (2008)

Together Again is a 2007 album released by Irish singers Daniel O'Donnell and Mary Duff.

== Track listing ==
1. Together Again - 3:25
2. Top of the World - 3:01
3. The Carnival Is Over - 3:20
4. My Happiness - 3:17
5. Are You Teasing Me (Charlie Louvin / Ira Louvin) - 2:50
6. Timeless And True Love (Charlie Black / Buzz Cason) - 2:41
7. You're My Best Friend - 3:05
8. Hey, Good Lookin' - 2:13
9. Harbour Lights - 2:54
10. Do You Think You Could Love Me Again (Kevin Sheerin) - 2:10
11. Til' A Tear Becomes A Rose (Bill Rice / Mary Sharon Rice) - 3:34
12. I Don't Care (Buck Owens) - 2:09
13. Yes, Mr. Peters (Steve Karliski / Larry Kolber) - 2:50
14. Daddy Was An Old Time Preacher Man (Dolly Parton) - 3:19
15. Save Your Love - 3:19

== Charts ==
Chart performance for Together Again
Chart (2007)	Peak position
Australian Albums (ARIA)	66
New Zealand Albums (RMNZ)	19
UK Albums (OCC)	6
