= Moon Over Ireland =

Studio album by Daniel O'Donnell
- Released: March 7, 2011
- Recorded: 2011
- Genre: Easy-listening, Irish folk
- Label: Rosette Records

Daniel O'Donnell chronology
O Holy Night (2010)	Moon Over Ireland (2011)	The Ultimate Collection (2012)

Moon Over Ireland is the 31st studio album released by Irish singer Daniel O'Donnell in 2011. It contained original songs and newly recorded versions of well-known Irish songs.

== Track listing ==
1. "Moon Over Ireland" - 4:09
2. "Maggie" - 3:28
3. "The Fields of Athenry" - 4:53
4. "Tipperary Girl" - 3:01
5. "Cottage by the Lee" - 3:40
6. "My Father's House" - 4:00
7. "Sweet Sixteen" - 3:28
8. "The Galway Shawl" - 4:46
9. "My Lovely Donegal" - 3:42
10. "My Wild Irish Rose" - 3:08
11. "The Boys from Killybegs" - 3:30
12. "Sonny" - 4:32
13. "Moonlight in Mayo" - 3:14
14. "Two Little Orphans" - 3:08
15. "The Town I Loved So Well" - 7:01

== Charts ==
Chart (2011)	Peak position
UK Albums Chart	9
Irish Albums Chart	11
Australian Physical Albums Chart	47

== See also ==
- Dick Farrelly
