= Kathleen Nesbitt =

Irish fiddle player and teacher

Kathleen Nesbitt is an Irish fiddle player and teacher. She is the mother of famous Irish fiddler Máiréad Nesbitt.

== Background ==
Kathleen Nesbitt began teaching fiddle in 1967 and is among the most well known music teachers in Ireland. In 1983, she began teaching an intensive master class at Scoil Éigse. She has travelled internationally performing in the US, Canada, Iceland and France. Since 1990, she has taught at the Festival Interceltique de Lorient.

Nesbitt currently serves as assessor and lecturer of Traditional Irish music at the Comhaltas Ceoltóirí Éireann.

== Awards ==
Nesbitt is the winner of the Oireachtas Gold Medal and also the winner of the Oireachtas duet competition with her husband John.

== Books ==
- Fidil-Irish Fiddle Tutorial, (2002) ISBN 0-9543402-0-5
