= Máiréad Nesbitt =

Irish musician

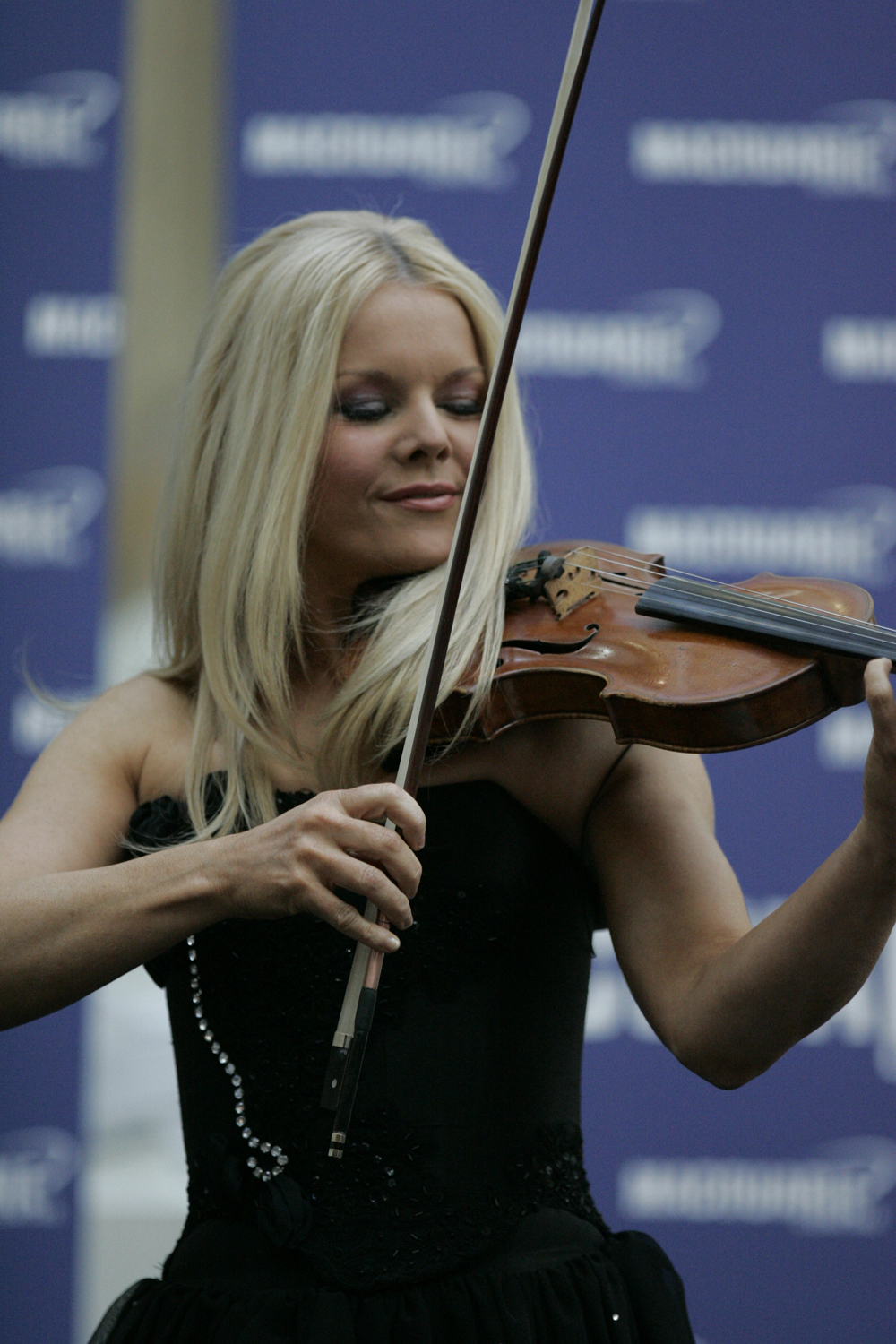
- Máiréad Nesbitt at Macquarie Shopping Centre, Sydney, in August 2012

Background information
- Born: Loughmore, County Tipperary, Ireland
- Genres: Celtic; classical
- Occupation: Musician
- Instruments: Fiddle; violin; piano
- Years active: 1996–present
- Labels: Vertical; Manhattan
- Spouse: Jim Mustapha Jr. (m. 2011)
- Website: www.maireadnesbittviolin.com

Máiréad Nesbitt (/məˈreɪd/ mə-RAYD) is an Irish musician. She is known for performing Celtic and classical music and being the former fiddler for Celtic Woman. She was also one of the two original fiddlers in Michael Flatley’s Lord of the Dance in the mid to late 1990s, along with its extended version Feet of Flames in the early 2000s.

== Background ==
Nesbitt was born to John and Kathleen Nesbitt, both music teachers in County Tipperary, Ireland. She has a sister, Frances, and four brothers, Seán, Michael, Noel and Karl, all of whom are musicians. She has been a piano player since the age of four, and began playing the violin at age six.

Her formal musical studies began at The Ursuline Convent in Thurles, County Tipperary and progressed through the Waterford Institute of Technology and the Cork School of Music, during which time she participated in the National Youth Orchestra of Ireland. Nesbitt completed postgraduate studies at Royal Academy of Music and Trinity College of Music in London under Emanuel Hurwitz.

Besides her family, Nesbitt has stated that her influences range from Itzhak Perlman and Michael Coleman to bluegrass artist Alison Krauss and rock's David Bowie and Sting.

== Personal life ==
Nesbitt has been married to Jim Mustapha Jr., Celtic Woman's then-lighting director, since 2011.

== Discography ==
Solo

- Raining Up (2001 UK Release; 2006 US Release)
- Hibernia (December 2016)
- Celtic Spells (February 2023)

With Celtic Woman

- Celtic Woman (March 2005)
- Celtic Woman: A Christmas Celebration (October 2006)
- Celtic Woman: A New Journey (January 2007)
- Celtic Woman: The Greatest Journey (October 2008)
- Celtic Woman: Songs from the Heart (January 2010)
- Celtic Woman: Lullaby (February 2011)
- Celtic Woman: Believe (May 2011, January 2012)
- Celtic Woman: Home for Christmas (October 2012)
- Celtic Woman: Emerald - Musical Gems (February 2014)
- Celtic Woman: Destiny (October 2015)
- Celtic Woman: The Best of Christmas (November 2017)

With The Dhol Foundation

- Drum-Believable (2005)

Other contributions

- Lord of the Dance (March 1997)
- Feet of Flames (February 1999)
- Tinker Bell (soundtrack) (October 2008)
- Tinker Bell and the Lost Treasure (soundtrack) (September 2009)
- Devil's Bit Sessions (June 2017)
- Harmonious (soundtrack) (October 2021)

== Filmography ==
- Lord of the Dance (November 1999)
- Celtic Woman (March 2005)
- Celtic Woman: A New Journey (January 2007)
- Celtic Woman: A Christmas Celebration (October 2007)
- Celtic Woman: The Greatest Journey (October 2008)
- Celtic Woman: Songs from the Heart (January 2010)
- Celtic Woman: Believe (January 2012)
- Celtic Woman: Home for Christmas (October 2013)
- Celtic Woman: Emerald - Musical Gems (February 2014)
- Celtic Woman: Destiny (October 2015)
