= Don Oíche Úd i mBeithil =

Irish Christmas carol

- Christmas carol

"Don Oíche Úd i mBeithil" (Irish: [d̪ˠənˠ ˈiːçə uːd̪ˠ ə ˈmʲɛhəlʲ]; "That Night in Bethlehem"; archaic spelling: "Don Oidhche Úd i mBeithil") is a popular Irish-language Christmas carol, of unclear origin. It is played as a reel in 4/4 time.

== Origins ==
It has been claimed to go back to the 7th century AD.

== Lyrics ==
Don oíche úd i mBeithil,
beidh tagairt ar ghrian go brách
Don oíche úd i mBeithil,
go dtáinig an Briathar slán
Tá gríosghrua ar spéartha,
's an talamh 'na chlúdach bán
Féach íosagán sa chléibhín,
's an Mhaighdean in aoibhneas grá

Ar leacain lom an tsléibhe,
go nglacann na haoirí scáth
Nuair in oscailt gheal na spéire,
tá teachtaire Dé ar fáil

Céad glóir anois don Athair,
i bhFlaitheasa thuas go hard
Is feasta fós ar talamh,
d'fheara, dea-mhéin síocháin.

Translation:

I sing of a night in Bethlehem
A night as bright as dawn
I sing of that night in Bethlehem
The night the Word was born
The skies are glowing gaily
The earth in white is dressed
See Jesus in the cradle
Drink deep in His mother's breast

And there on a lonely hillside
The shepherds bow down in fear
When the heavens open brightly
And God's message rings out so clear

Glory now to the Father
In all the heavens high
And peace to His friends on earth below
Is all the angels cry

== Notable recordings ==
- Anne-Marie O’Farrell produced a 1988 version.
- The Chieftains performed the song on the 1991 album The Bells of Dublin.
- A version appears on Celtic Woman's 2006 album A Christmas Celebration.
- Horslips recorded the song on their 1975 album Drive The Cold Winter Away.
- The Boys of the Lough recorded the song on their 1996 album, "Midwinter Night's Dream"

== See also ==
- List of Christmas carols
