= Rakes of Mallow =

Traditional Irish song

Song
- Published: 1742
- Genre: Irish folk

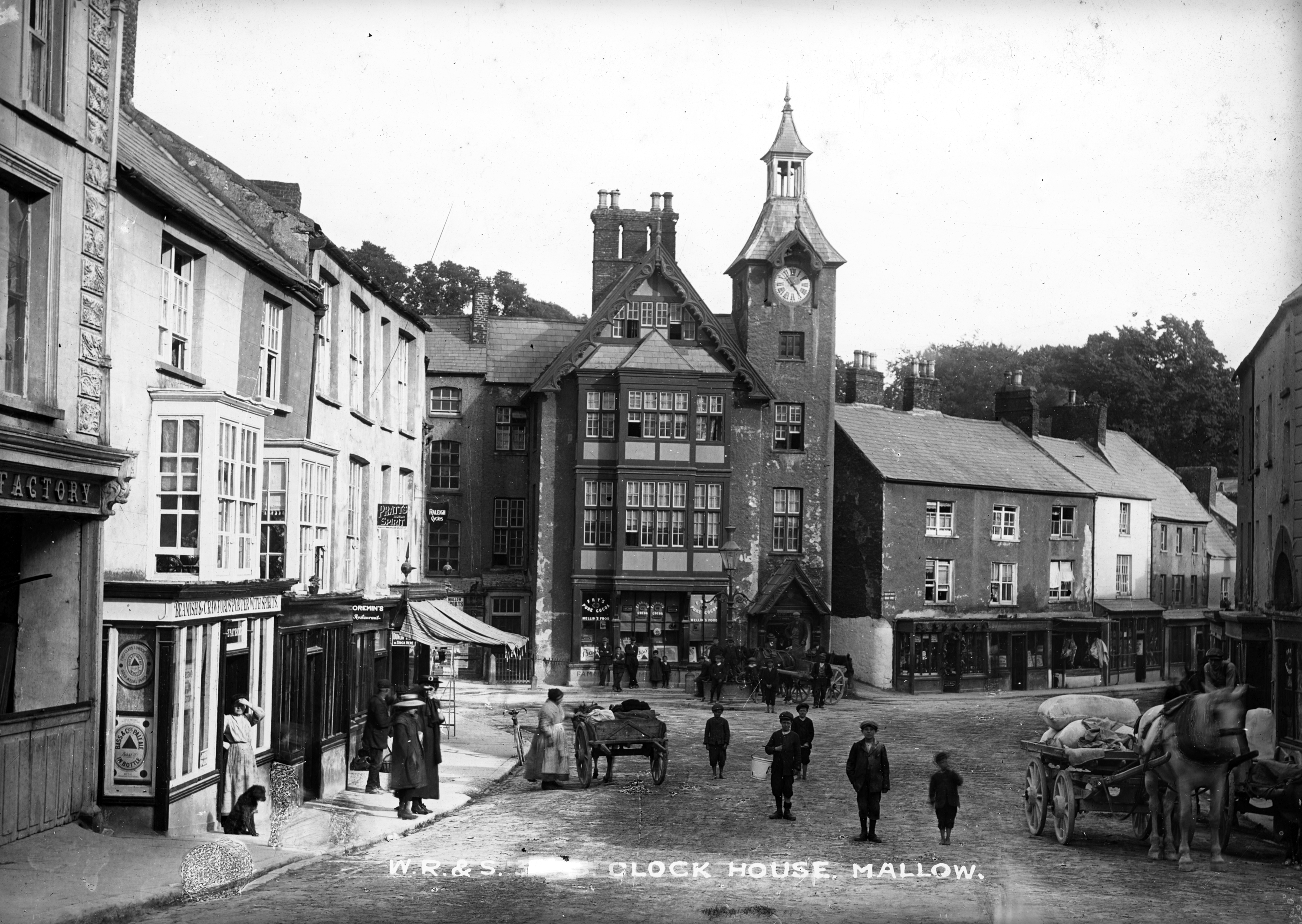
Mallow, c. 1901.

"The Rakes of Mallow" is a traditional Irish song and polka. The song is about the rakes from the town of Mallow, a town in County Cork. The song was written about the Creagh family who came from Doneraile, seven miles away. It is similar to the tune of The Rigs of Marlow, from which it may have been adapted.

It was published as early as 1742 in London, and later in Scotland during the 1780s. The song is also used as a fight song for Notre Dame Fighting Irish fans. A version of the song was arranged by Leroy Anderson, and the song was also featured for fight scenes in the films The Quiet Man (1952) and 1941 (1979), as well as for a montage sequence in the 1993 film set at the aforementioned University of Notre Dame, Rudy. It was also used in the dancing sequence of Disney's The Legend of Sleepy Hollow.

It was one of the European songs adapted by the Indian Carnatic music composer Muthuswami Dikshitar in the 18th/19th century with Sanskrit lyrics, in this case as Vande Meenakshi, a prayer to the goddess Meenakshi.

== Adaptations ==
Tommaso Giordani uses the tune in the 3rd movement of his overture to "The Island of Saints"

Leroy Anderson
