= Raining Up =

Studio album by Máiréad Nesbitt
- Released: 2001, January 2006 (US)
- Recorded: 2001
- Genres: Celtic, pop
- Label: Vertical

Raining Up is Máiréad Nesbitt's debut solo music album, which was recorded and published in 2001 by Vertical Records, UK. It was also released in North America 2006 under the label Manhattan. The musical CD contains a combination of traditional Irish, Scottish and newly composed Irish and contemporary tunes. Tracks were written by Máiréad and her brother Karl.

The album was produced by Manus Lunny and Colm O'Foghlú.

The album peaked on the Billboard World Music album chart at #12 in 2006.

== Track listing ==
No.	Title	Written By	Arranged By	Length
1	Skidoo	Stephen Cooney	M. Nesbitt / M. Lunny	3:06
2	Raining Up	Karl Nesbitt	M. Nesbitt / M. Lunny	3:07
3	Bovaglies Plaid	J. Scott Skinner	M. Nesbitt / Donald Shaw	3:49
4	Finan's isle	Charles McFarlane	M. Nesbitt / M. Lunny	3:42
5	The Setting Sun	Liz Carrol	M. Nesbitt / M. Lunny	2:49
6	The Butterfly	Liz Carrol	M. Nesbitt / M. Lunny	2:52
7	There Is No Night	Colm O'Foghlú	Colm O'Foghlú	3:54
8	Captain H	Máiréad Nesbitt	M. Nesbitt / M. Lunny	3:02
9	An Raibh Tú Ag An Gcarraig?	traditional	Colm O'Foghlú	3:26
10	Trí Fhidilí	Smash The Windows/Prestons (traditional)	M. Nesbitt / M. Lunny	2:54
11	Bluelights	Máiréad Nesbitt & Stephen Cooney	M. Nesbitt / S. Cooney / Mackintosh / Vernal / Shaw	4:32
12	Within The Blue Suite - 1st movement	Colm O'Foghlú	Colm O'Foghlú	2:14
13	Within The Blue suite - 2nd movement	Colm O'Foghlú	Colm O'Foghlú	4:18
14	Within The Blue suite - 3rd movement	Colm O'Foghlú	Colm O'Foghlú	3:07

All arrangements: (MCPS)

Tracks 1, 2, 3, 4, 5, 6, 8, 10 and 11: produced by Mánus Lunny

Tracks 7, 9, 12, 13 and 14: produced by Colm O'Foghlú

Personnel:

- Máiréad Nesbitt: vocals, guitar, bouzouki, fiddle
- Kathleen Nesbitt: fiddle
- Frances Nesbitt: fiddle
- Karl Nesbitt: didgeridoo, bodhrán
- Sean Nesbitt: box
- Michael McGoldrick: flute, pipes
- Colm O Foghlú: whistle, keyboards, percussion, programming
- Steve Kettley: trumpet
- Toby Shippey: trumpet
- Ryan Quigley: trumpet
- Greg Sheehan: talking drum
- Dónal Lunny: bodhrán
- Ron Aslan: programming
