= Mary Duff =

Irish country, pop and folk singer

- Born: 19 July 1964 (age 62); County Meath, Ireland
- Genres: Country folk
- Occupation: Musician
- Years active: 1987–present
- Spouse: Paul McKenna (divorced)
- Website: maryduffmusic.com

Mary Duff is an Irish country, pop and folk singer.

Duff was Meath person of the year in 1990. In 1997 she was voted best Irish female vocalist. In 1998, 1999 and 2000 she was voted country music’s best British female vocalist.

== Early life ==
Mary Duff was born to farmer parents on July 19, 1964, in County Meath, Ireland

Her family were passionate about Irish traditional music. Duff was exposed to music from a young age and enjoyed singing and performing.

== Career ==
Duff’s rise to fame began in the 1990s when she was discovered by Irish singer Daniel O'Donnell. O'Donnell invited her to perform with him on his television show. Duff became a regular on the show and soon began touring with Daniel. She quickly gained a reputation as one of the most talented singers in Ireland, and her popularity began to grow beyond the country’s borders.

Duff and O'Donnell parted ways as a duo in 2019. Duff has said "I wanted to experiment more with songs and do a wider variety of songs, not necessarily ones that would have suited his audience."

Duff has collaborating with other musicians, including Vince Gill, Dolly Parton, and George Hamilton IV.

== Personal life ==
Duff married her manager, Paul McKenna; they have two children together and are now divorced. She is a private person. She is a devout Catholic.

== Discography ==
=== Studio albums ===
List of studio albums, with selected chart positions and certifications
Title	Album details	Peak chart positions		Certifications
Title	Album details	AUS	UK	Certifications
Love Someone Like Me	Released: 1988; Label: Ritz (RITZLP0044)	—	—	
Winning Ways	Released: 1989; Label: Ritz (RITZCD112)	—	—	
Silver and Gold	Released: 1992; Label: Ritz (RITZCD066)	—	—	
Just Lovin' You	Released: 1995; Label: Ritz (RITZCD075)	—	—	
Timeless (with Daniel O'Donnell)	Released: March 1996; Label: Ritz (RITZBCD707)	—	13	BPI: Silver
Shades of Blue	Released: 1997; Label: Ritz (RITZCD082)	—	—	
Heartbreaker	Released: 2002; Label: Rosette Records (ROSCD2029)	—	—	
Just a Country Girl	Released: 2004; Label: Rosette Records (ROSCD2048)	—	—	
Time After Time	Released: 2004; Label: Rosette Records (ROSCD2063)	—	—	
Together Again (with Daniel O'Donnell)	Released: November 2007; Label: Rosette (ROSCD2090)	66	6	BPI: Gold
Voice of an Angel	Released: 2009; Label: BIG JO-KE Music	—	—	
Changing Lanes	Released: May 2016; Label: ISG Records / Venus (ISGRVEN003)	—	—	
Turn Back the Years	Released: 2019; Label: Rosette Records (ROSCD2777)	—	—	

=== Charting compilation albums ===
List of charting compilation albums, with selected chart positions
Title	Album details	Peak chart positions	
Title	Album details	AUS	UK
The Ultimate Collection	Released: September 2005; Label: DMG TV (DMGTV019)	—	52

== Singles ==
List of charting singles, with selected chart positions
Title	Year	Peak chart positions		Album
Title	Year	AUS	UK	Album
"Secret Love" (with Daniel O'Donnell)	1995	—	28	Timeless
"Timeless" (with Mary Duff)	1996	—	32	Timeless
