= Scoil Éigse =

Scoil Éigse is the official summer school organised by Comhaltas Ceoltóirí Éireann where Irish people and students from the United Kingdom, Europe, Asia and North America go to obtain a better and deeper understanding of Irish music and culture.

The school provides workshops, lectures, concerts and sessions in the week prior to the Fleadh Cheoil na hÉireann and continues each day during the Fleadh.

Tuition is given in traditional music, song, and dance each day with informal céilíthe and sessions each evening.

== See also ==
- Queen Maeve International Summer School
- Willie Clancy Summer School
- Fleadh Cheoil

== See also ==
- Celtic music
- Irish Recorded Music Association
- Irish topics
- Irish traditional music session
