= Country Boy (Daniel O'Donnell album) =

Studio album by Daniel O'Donnell
- Released: 27 October 2008
- Recorded: 2008
- Genre: Country
- Label: Rosette Records

Daniel O'Donnell chronology
Together Again (2007)	Country Boy (2008)	Peace in the Valley (2009)

Country Boy is the 26th studio album released by Irish singer Daniel O'Donnell in 2008. The album consists of covers of popular country songs, including duets with Charley Pride and Loretta Lynn.

== Track listing ==
1. I'm Going to Be a Country Boy Again (Buffy Sainte-Marie) – 2:16
2. If I Said You Had a Beautiful Body Would You Hold It Against Me – 3:44
3. Lucille – 3:30
4. Back Home Again – 4:21
5. Me and Bobby McGee – 4:16
6. King of the Road – 2:47
7. Little Ole Wine Drinker Me – 3:10
8. Release Me – 3:20
9. From Here To There To You – 2:08
10. Detroit City – 3:12
11. I Wanna Be Free – 2:20 (with Loretta Lynn)
12. Mother's Birthday Song (John Farry) – 3:37
13. Crystal Chandeliers - 2:48 (with Charley Pride)
14. Seven Spanish Angels - 3:54
15. Ring of Fire - 2:41
16. He Stopped Loving Her Today - 3:23
17. Okie From Muskogee - 2:58
18. I'm Just Lucky I Guess (Red Hayes) - 2:24
19. Could I Have This Dance For The Rest Of My Life - 3:39
20. Oh Lonesome Me - 2:38

== Charts ==
=== Weekly charts ===
Chart (2008)	Peak position
Australian Albums (ARIA)	64
Irish Albums (IRMA)	23
Scottish Albums (OCC)	11
UK Albums (OCC)	6
UK Country Albums Chart (OCC)	1

=== Year-end charts ===
Chart (2008)	Position
UK Albums (OCC)	114

== Certifications ==
Region	Certification	Certified units/sales
United Kingdom (BPI)	Gold	100,000^{^}
^{^} Shipments figures based on certification alone.
