= Nottuswara =

Set of 39 South Indian compositions

The nottuswaram (nōṭṭusvarams, from "note" + "swaras") are a set of 39 compositions in Carnatic music by Muthuswami Dikshitar (18th c.), who is celebrated as one among the Trinity of Carnatic music. A few other nottusvarams were added later by his disciples which adhere to the original idea and intent. Nottusvarams are notable as an interaction between the East and the West during the East India company rule in Madras Chennai, being based on Western sources, mostly simple melodies inspired by Scottish and Irish tunes. They are all composed with Sanskrit lyrics in the Western C major scale, whose pitch intervals correspond to that of the Shankarabharana raga scale in Carnatic music, or the Bilaval that of Hindustani music. Technically, the compositions are not in Shankarabharana proper, being based on simple melodies and devoid of the ornamentation (gamaka) that is characteristic of Carnatic music. On the other hand, the lyrics (sahitya) of these compositions are entirely Indian and consistent with the rest of the stotra-literature, or other songs addressed to similar deities.

Sometimes the name "nottuswaram" is used to refer to other compositions based on Western notes, not necessarily by Muthuswami Dikshitar.

== Violin ==
According to one popular account, the violin was introduced into Carnatic music by Baluswami Dikshitar (1786–1858), the younger brother of Muthuswami Dikshitar. He encountered the instrument being played by British bands in colonial Madras Chennai, and decided to learn it. The music was mostly Irish and Scottish fiddling, rather than Western classical music. After three years of lessons, he adapted the violin to Carnatic music. It is believed that Muthuswami Dikshitar composed these lyrics to aid his brother master the plain notes on the violin.

== Publication history ==
They were first documented in print by C. P. Brown in 1833. In 1893, Manali Chinnaswamy Mudaliar published them with European notation, and in 1905, they were compiled by Subbarama Dikshitar as 'Prathamaabhyaasa pustakamu' in Telugu. In recent years, Kanniks Kannikeswaran has researched these compositions further, found the sources of a few compositions, and given several lectures.

== Examples ==
The European songs used as basis include "Limerick", "Castilian Maid", "Lord MacDonald's Reel", "Voulez-vous Danser?", and "God Save the King".

Composition	Based on
"Santatam Pahimam" Example	"God Save the King"/"My Country, 'Tis of Thee"/"Grand Dieu sauve le roi" Anthem
"Vande Meenakshi" Traditional setting/"Indo-Celtic"	"Rakes of Mallow" Leroy Anderson/Live version
"Kamalasana Vandita Padabje" Flute	Galopede / Yarmouth Reel / Persian Ricardo Jabara/Concert/Reel
"Shakti Sahita Ganapatim" Traditional/Indo-Celtic	"Voulez-vous danser?"
"Shyamale Meenakshi" Video	"Twinkle Twinkle Little Star"/Mozart's variations on "Ah! vous dirai-je, Maman"
"Jagadisha Guruguha"	"Lord MacDonald's Reel"
"Vara Shiva Balam"	"Castilian Maid"
