= O' Holy Night (Daniel O'Donnell album) =

O Holy Night

Studio album by Daniel O'Donnell
- Released: November 30, 2010
- Recorded: 2010
- Genres: Easy-listening, Christmas
- Label: Rosette Records
- Producers: John Tate, Mack Wilberg

Daniel O'Donnell chronology
Peace in the Valley (2009)	O Holy Night (2010)	Moon Over Ireland (2011)

O' Holy Night is the 30th studio album released by Irish singer Daniel O'Donnell in 2010. It contains newly recorded versions of well-known Christmas songs.

== Track listing ==
1. "Mary's Boy Child" (3:46)
2. "Angels We Have Heard on High" (3:04)
3. "O Little Town of Bethlehem" (3:02)
4. "The Little Drummer Boy" (3:12)
5. "Adeste Fideles (O Come, All Ye Faithful)" (3:12)
6. "Mary, Did You Know?" (3:25)
7. "Away in a Manger" (2:20)
8. "The Twelve Days of Christmas" (4:59)
9. "O Holy Night" (4:36)
10. "Remember Me" (3:16)
11. "Silent Night" (3:16)
12. "Once in Royal David's City" (2:13)
13. "The First Noel" (2:14)
14. "In the Bleak Midwinter" (4:35)
15. "Christmas 1915" (4:25)

== Charts ==
Chart (2010)	Peak position
UK Albums Chart	21
