= Peace in the Valley (Daniel O'Donnell album) =

Studio album by Daniel O'Donnell
- Released: October 13, 2009
- Recorded: 2009
- Genre: Easy-listening
- Label: Rosette Records

Daniel O'Donnell chronology
Country Boy (2008)	Peace in the Valley (2009)	O Holy Night (2010)

Peace in the Valley is the 29th studio album released by Irish singer Daniel O'Donnell in 2009.

== Track listing ==
1. Peace in the Valley
2. Mansion Over the Hilltop
3. Far Side Banks of Jordan
4. On the Wings of a Dove
5. If Jesus Comes Tomorrow, What Then
6. Wait A Little Longer Please Jesus (Houser)
7. Precious Memories
8. If I Could Hear My Mother Pray Again
9. Just a Closer Walk with Thee
10. A Satisfied Mind
11. I Won't Have to Cross Jordan Alone (Charles E. Durham / Tom Ramsey)
12. The Church in the Wildwood
13. Praying (Houser)
14. Where We Never Grow Old
15. I'll Fly Away

== Charts ==
Chart (2009)	Peak position
UK Album Chart	8
UK Country Albums Chart	1
Irish Album Chart	14
NZ Album Chart	18
