= Daniel O'Donnell =

Irish singer (born 1961)

Daniel O'Donnell MBE
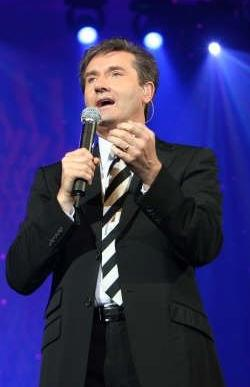
- O'Donnell in concert in 2009

Background information
- Also known as: "Wee Daniel"
- Born: Daniel Francis Noel O'Donnell; 12 December 1961 (age 64); Kincasslagh, County Donegal, Ireland
- Genres: Country, easy listening, folk
- Occupations: Singer, songwriter
- Instrument: Vocals
- Years active: 1980–present
- Website: www.danielodonnell.org

Daniel Francis Noel O'Donnell MBE (born 12 December 1961) is an Irish singer, television presenter and philanthropist. After rising to public attention in 1983, he has since become a household name in Ireland and Britain, and has also enjoyed considerable success in Australia. In 2012, he became the first artist to have a different album in the British charts every year for 25 consecutive years. This record was later extended, and until the run ended in 2024, O'Donnell had an album in the main Official Albums Chart each year for 36 years, making him one of the most consistently successful recording artists of all time.

O'Donnell's music consists of a blend of country and Irish folk, which has sold over ten million records. . Known as "Wee Daniel", O'Donnell is a prominent ambassador for his home county of Donegal.

== Early life ==
Daniel Francis Noel O'Donnell was born on 12 December 1961 and raised in the village of Kincasslagh, in The Rosses district in the west of County Donegal, Ireland. He is a descendant of the Irish high king Niall of the Nine Hostages. He is the youngest child in a Roman Catholic family, born to Julia (née McGonagle; 1919–2014) and Francis O'Donnell, and has four older siblings John, Margaret (Margo), Kathleen, and James. He has described his upbringing as mostly happy, apart from the death of his father from a heart attack when O'Donnell was six years old.

During his school years, O'Donnell considered a career in banking, although music was also a strong possibility. As a youngster, he sang in the local church choir. In 1980, he moved to Galway to pursue business studies, but he did not settle and returned home by Christmas to join his sister Margo's band. By that time, Margo had already established a successful career in Ireland.

== Career ==
=== Rise to fame ===
Not getting enough opportunities to perform solos with the band, O'Donnell decided in 1983 to record his own material. On 9 February 1983, he recorded his first single, Johnny McCauley's "My Donegal Shore", using £1,200 of his own money, and sold all the copies himself. Later that year, he formed his own musical group, Country Fever. After the group disbanded, he formed The Grassroots. In 1985, Mick Clerkin, manager of the Ritz label, saw him perform and introduced him to Seán Reilly, who remains his manager.

Under Reilly's management, O'Donnell began regularly selling out concerts in England. According to O'Donnell, by January 1992 he had reached "rock bottom" with exhaustion. After a three-month recovery break, he returned to the stage, performing at the Point Theatre in Dublin.

=== Success ===
By the mid‑1990s, O'Donnell had become a household name across Ireland and Great Britain. He appeared on popular television programmes in both countries and received several awards. Among these, he was named Donegal Person of the Year in 1989, an honour he has described as his most meaningful. He was also awarded Irish Entertainer of the Year in 1989, 1992, and 1996. His first UK chart hit came in 1992 with "I Just Want to Dance With You" (later covered by George Strait), which led to his first appearance on Top of the Pops.

Throughout his career, O'Donnell has befriended several of his childhood idols, including Cliff Richard and Loretta Lynn. He also developed a close professional relationship with the Irish singer Mary Duff, who has frequently toured with him.

In 1994, O'Donnell cancelled a series of concerts in Northern Ireland following death threats from loyalist paramilitaries. The threat was made in a phone call to the Viking House Hotel in Kincasslagh, County Donegal, warning that he would be killed if he proceeded with four sold‑out concerts at the Slieve Donard Hotel in Newcastle, County Down.

=== 2000–present ===
In 2002, O'Donnell was awarded an Honorary MBE (as an Irish citizen) for his services to the music industry. He has achieved 20 UK Top 40 albums, 15 Top 40 singles, and has sold more than 10 million records. He gained considerable success in North America after starring in seven concert specials on PBS in the United States. He has charted 18 albums in the Top 20 of the U.S. Billboard World Music Albums Chart, and has also appeared on the Independent Albums chart. In 2011, RTÉ broadcast a Christmas Day special, Daniel at 50, to mark his 50th birthday.

In 2015, O'Donnell became the first artist to have released at least one new album in the UK charts for 28 consecutive years (1988–2015), when The Hank Williams Songbook entered the UK Albums Chart at number five.

A Daniel O'Donnell Visitors' Centre opened in Dungloe in 2012 to display his memorabilia; it closed in 2019 when the building was sold.

In Autumn 2015, he appeared on Strictly Come Dancing, and was eliminated third.

In October 2015, O'Donnell and his wife Majella starred in the first series of their television programme Daniel and Majella's B&B Road Trip. The series aired on UTV before moving to RTÉ in 2016.

== Personal life ==
O'Donnell married 41‑year‑old Majella McLennan from Thurles on 4 November 2002, when he was 40. The couple had met on holiday in Tenerife three years earlier. McLennan had received an annulment of her previous marriage, from which she has two children. O'Donnell and McLennan live in Meenbanad, County Donegal, and spend part of the year at their second home in Tenerife.

O'Donnell is proficient in Irish and has presented a programme in the language for the broadcaster TG4.

Although he rarely comments on political matters, O'Donnell voiced his support for the Thirty-fourth Amendment of the Constitution of Ireland in 2015. He has also spoken in favour of redress for homeowners in Ireland whose houses were built using mica.

== Philanthropy ==
O'Donnell has been involved in numerous charitable causes for many years, most notably in Romania. He has supported the Romanian Challenge Appeal, a charity that helps orphaned Romanian children integrate into society. He also encouraged Irish families to host these young people in Ireland for a period.

== Image ==
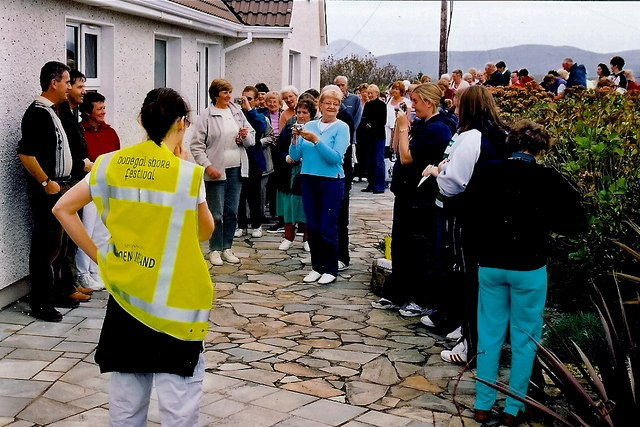
Fans meeting O'Donnell at his annual 'tea party', at his mother's residence in Kincasslagh, County Donegal

O'Donnell is often noted for his gentle, soft‑spoken personality and clean‑cut image, which have become as recognisable as his music. Over the years he has attracted considerable media attention, and there have been numerous cultural references to him. He is frequently satirised in Irish and British comedy, largely due to the common perception that his audience consists mainly of older women. He was parodied as the celebrity singer "Eoin McLove" in the Father Ted episode "Night of the Nearly Dead", and the BBC sketch-show Chewin' the Fat as an Irish singer named "Donald O'Daniel". The comedy series Bull Island and the radio sketch segment Gift Grub portrayed him, often singing about his "mammy". DJ Chris Moyles has parodied O'Donnell on several occasions.

O'Donnell is known for his close relationship with his fans and holds a meet‑and‑greet session after almost every concert. He previously hosted a large annual tea party for fans outside his home in Donegal. He has also expressed a wish to appear in Coronation Street.

He appeared on Martin and Paul's Surf 'n' Turf.

== Discography ==
=== Studio albums ===
List of studio albums, with selected chart positions and certifications
Title	Album details	Peak chart positions			Certifications
Title	Album details	AUS	NZ	UK	Certifications
The Boy from Donegal	Released: 1984; Label: Prism Leisure Corp. Plc (HLP4)	—	—	—	
Two Sides of Daniel O'Donnell	Released: 1985; Label: Ritz Records (RITZLP0031)	—	—	—	
I Need You	Released: 1986; Label: Ritz Records (RITZLP0038)	—	—	—	
Don't Forget to Remember	Released: 1987; Label: Ritz Records (RITZLP0043)	—	—	—	
From the Heart	Released: October 1988; Label: Telstar (STAR2327)	—	—	56	BPI: Gold
Thoughts of Home	Released: October 1989; Label: Telstar (STAR2372)	—	—	43	
The Last Waltz	Released: November 1990; Label: Ritz (RITZCD0058)	—	—	46	
Follow Your Dream	Released: November 1992; Label: Ritz (RITZBCD701)	—	—	17	BPI: Silver
Especially for You	Released: October 1994; Label: Ritz (RITZBCD703)	—	—	14	BPI: Gold
Christmas with Daniel	Released: November 1994; Label: Ritz (RITZBCD704)	—	—	34	BPI: Gold
Timeless (with Mary Duff)	Released: March 1996; Label: Ritz (RITZBCD707)	—	—	13	BPI: Silver
The Daniel O'Donnell Irish Collection	Released: July 1996; Label: Ritz (RITZCD0080)	—	—	35	BPI: Silver
Songs of Inspiration	Released: October 1996; Label: Ritz (RITZBCD709)	—	—	11	
I Believe	Released: October 1997; Label: Ritz (RITZBLC710)	—	—	11	BPI: Gold
Love Songs	Released: October 1998; Label: Ritz (RITZBLC715)	36	—	9	BPI: Gold
Faith and Inspiration	Released: October 2000; Label: Ritz (RZBCD717)	—	—	4	BPI: Gold
Live, Laugh, Love	Released: November 2001; Label: Rosette (ROSCD2002)	—	—	27	BPI: Gold
Yesterday's Memories	Released: October 2002; Label: Rosette (ROSCD2020)	—	—	19	
Daniel in Blue Jeans	Released: March 2003; Label: DMG TV (DMGTV001)	—	—	3	BPI: Gold
At the End of the Day	Released: October 2003; Label: Rosette (ROSCD2040)	—	—	11	BPI: Gold
The Jukebox Years – 20 More Blue Jeans Classics	Released: March 2004; Label: DMG TV (DMGTV005)	36	—	3	
Welcome to My World	Released: October 2004; Label: Rosette (ROSCD2050)	87	—	6	
Teenage Dreams	Released: September 2005; Label: Rosette (ROSCD2060)	87	—	10	
Until the Next Time	Released: October 2006; Label: Rosette (ROSCD2080)	48	36	10	
Together Again (with Mary Duff)	Released: November 2007; Label: Rosette (ROSCD2090)	66	19	6	BPI: Gold
Country Boy	Released: October 2008; Label: DMG TV (DMGTV035)	64	—	6	BPI: Gold
Peace in the Valley	Released: October 2009; Label: DMG TV (DMGTV036)	—	18	8	BPI: Gold
O' Holy Night	Released: November 2010; Label: DMG TV (DMGTV040)	—	—	21	
Moon Over Ireland	Released: March 2011; Label: DMG TV (DMGTV042)	—	10	9	
Songs from the Movies and More	Released: October 2012; Label: DMG TV (DMGTV048)	60	10	7	BPI: Silver
A Picture of You	Released: November 2013; Label: DMG TV (DMGTV052)	—	3	16	BPI: Silver
The Hank Williams Songbook	Released: October 2015; Label: DMG TV (DMGTV061)	51	—	5	BPI: Silver
I Have a Dream: Classic Songs from the Seventies	Released: November 2016; Label: DMG TV (DMGTV063)	—	—	12	BPI: Silver
Christmas with Daniel	Released: November 2017; Label: DMG TV (DMGTV067)	—	—	19	
Walkin' in the Moonlight	Released: November 2018; Label: DMG TV (DMGTV072)	—	—	23	
Halfway to Paradise	Released: October 2019; Label: DMG TV (DMGTV076)	—	—	8	
Daniel	Released: 16 October 2020; Label: DMG TV (DMGTV077)	84	—	3	
60	Released: 15 October 2021; Label: DMG TV	—	—	4	
I Wish You Well	Released: 4 November 2022; Label: DMG TV	—	—	16	
How Lucky I Must Be	Released: 27 October 2023; Label: DMG TV	—	—	39	
Now and Then	Released: 3 October 2025; Label: DOD	—	—	92	

=== Live albums ===
List of live albums, with selected chart positions and certifications
Title	Album details	Peak chart positions			Certifications
Title	Album details	AUS	NZ	UK	Certifications
A Date with Daniel Live	Released: October 1993; Label: Ritz (RITZBCD702)	—	—	21	
Stand Beside Me – Live in Concert	Released: November 2014; Label: DMG TV (DMGTV059)	—	31	21	BPI: Silver
Hope and Praise	Released: May 2015; Label: Brockwell, Rosette, Sony Music Australia	82	—	—	
Back Home Again	Released: March 2017; Label: DMG TV (DMGTV064)	72	4	14	

=== Charting compilation albums ===
List of charting compilation albums, with selected chart positions and certifications
Title	Album details	Peak chart positions			Certifications
Title	Album details	AUS	NZ	UK	Certifications
Favourites	Released: April 1990; Label: Ritz (RITZCD0052)	—	—	61	BPI: Silver
The Very Best of Daniel O'Donnell	Released: November 1991; Label: Ritz (RITZBLD700)	—	—	34	
The Classic Collection	Released: November 1995; Label: Ritz (RITZBCD705)	—	—	34	
Greatest Hits	Released: September 1999; Label: Ritz (RZBCD716)	97	23	10	BPI: Gold
The Very Best of Daniel O'Donnell	Released: 2002; Label: Ritz (RITZBLC700)	—	6	—	
Memories	Released: March 2004; Label: CRIMSON (CRIMBX44)	—	—	94	
The Rock 'n' Roll Collection	Released: March 2005; Label: DMG TV (DMGTV015)	—	—	86	
From Daniel with Love	Released: January 2006; Label: DMG TV (DMGTV027)	32	—	5	BPI: Gold
Early Memories	Released: 2006; Label: CRIMSON (MCDLX033)	—	—	94	
The Essential Daniel O'Donnell	Released: March 2010; Label: Big Joke/ Sony	—	9	—	
The Ultimate Collection	Released: October 2011; Label: DMG TV (DMGTV045)	—	11	7	BPI: Gold
The Best of Music and Memories	Released: February 2016; Label: DMG TV (DMGTV062)	—	—	15	
The Gold Collection	Released: March 2019; Label: Crimson (CRIMCD622)	—	—	23	

=== Extended plays ===
List of EPs, with selected chart positions
Title	Album details	Peak chart positions		
Title	Album details	IRL	AUS	UK
Four Track EP	Released: July 1997; Label: Ritz (RITZ 150)	1	—	—
The Love Songs	Released: May 1997; Label: Ritz (RITZCD306)	—	96	27

=== Singles ===
List of charting singles, with selected chart positions
Title	Year	Peak chart positions			Album
Title	Year	IRL	AUS	UK	Album
"I Need You"	1987	—	—	126	I Need You
"Summertime In Ireland"	1987	—	—	164	Four Track EP
"Two's Company" (with Margo)	1988	3	—	171	Two's Company EP
"My Shoes Keep Walking Back To You" / "Far From Hom"	1989	1	—	101	Thoughts of Home
"Last Waltz of the Evening"	1990	7	—	—	The Last Waltz
"Marianne"	1991	22	—	—	The Last Waltz
"Letters from the Postman's Bag"	1991	9	—	—	
"The Three Bells"	1991	19	—	71	
"I Just Want to Dance with You"	1992	2	—	20	Follow Your Dream
"The Love in Your Eyes"	1993	23	—	47	Follow Your Dream
"What Ever Happened to Old Fashioned Love"	1993	15	—	21	Especially for You
"Singing the Blues"	1994	27	—	23	Especially for You
"The Gift"	1994	—	—	46	Christmas With Daniel
"Secret Love" (with Mary Duff)	1995	20	—	28	Timeless
"Timeless" (with Mary Duff)	1996	—	—	32	Timeless
"Footsteps"	1996	28	—	25	The Classic Collection
"Give a Little Love"	1998	5	82	7	Love Songs
"The Magic Is There"	1998	—	—	16	Love Songs
"The Way Dreams Are"	1999	—	—	18	Love Songs
"Uno Mas"	1999	—	—	25	Greatest Hits
"A Christmas Kiss"	1999	—	—	20	
"Light a Candle"	2000	—	—	23	Faith & Inspiration
"Morning Has Broken"	2000		—	32	Faith & Inspiration
"You Raise Me Up"	2003	—	—	22	At the End of the Day
"Crush On You"	2006	—	57	21	Until the Next Time

== Awards and honours ==
- 1988 – RTÉ Guide Favourite Country Artist of the Year
- 1989 – RTÉ Guide Favourite Country Artist of the Year
- 1989 – Donegal Person of the Year
- 1989 – IRMA Entertainer of the Year
- 1990 – RTÉ Guide Favourite Country Artist of the Year
- 1991 – RTÉ Guide Favourite Country Artist of the Year
- 1991 – British Country Music Awards International Artist of the Year
- 1991 – CMRU Most Popular British Vocalist
- 1991 – IRMA Entertainer of the Year
- 1992 – IRMA Entertainer of the Year
- 1992 – RTÉ Guide Favourite Country Artist of the Year
- 1992 – British Country Music Awards International Artist of the Year
- 1992 – CMRU Most Popular British Vocalist
- 1995 – British Country Music Awards International Artist of the Year
- 1997 – British Country Music Awards Ambassador Award for Outstanding Services to Country Music
- 2000 – This Is Your Life Tribute
- 2002 – Awarded an Honorary MBE for services to the music industry and charity
- 2004 – Lifetime Achievement Award from The Irish Post
- 2011 – Lifetime Achievement Award from the Sunday World

== See also ==
- List of baritones in non-classical music
- Music of Ireland
- Country and Irish
