= The Quiet Man =

1952 romantic comedy-drama film by John Ford

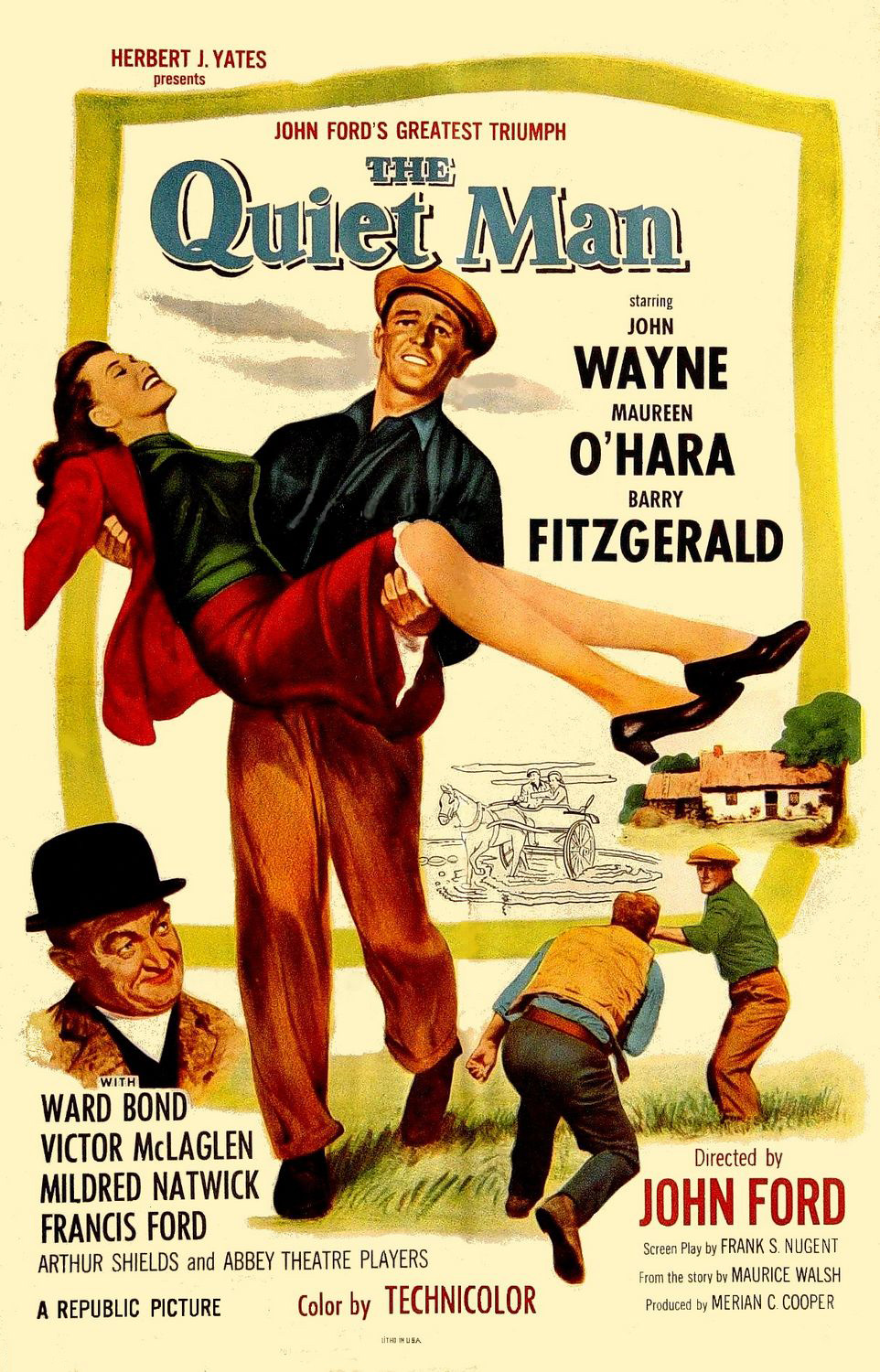
- Theatrical release poster
- Directed by: John Ford
- Screenplay by: Frank S. Nugent
- Based on: ”The Quiet Man” 1933 story in Saturday Evening Post by Maurice Walsh
- Produced by: John Ford; Merian C. Cooper
- Starring: John Wayne; Maureen O'Hara; Barry Fitzgerald; Ward Bond; Victor McLaglen; Mildred Natwick; Francis Ford; Arthur Shields; Abbey Theatre Players
- Cinematography: Winton C. Hoch
- Edited by: Jack Murray
- Music by: Victor Young
- Production companies: Republic Pictures; Argosy Pictures
- Distributed by: Republic Pictures
- Release dates: June 6, 1952 (London and Dublin); August 21, 1952 (New York City); September 14, 1952 (United States)
- Running time: 129 minutes
- Country: United States
- Languages: English; Irish
- Budget: $1.75 million or $1,698,254
- Box office: $3.8 million (rentals)

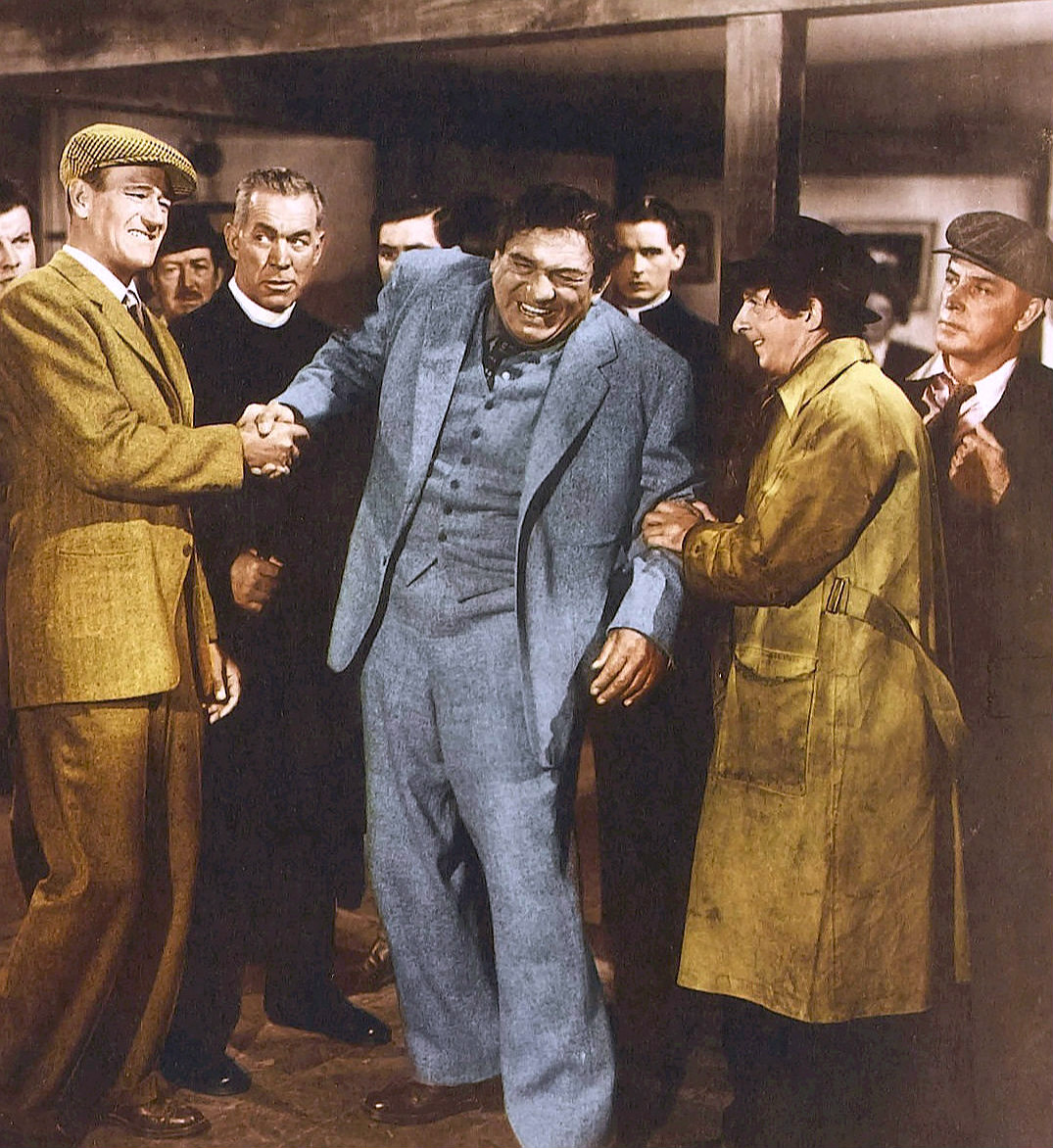
Sean Thornton (John Wayne) and Squire Danaher (Victor McLaglen) aggressively shake hands, testing each other's strength.

The Quiet Man is a 1952 American romantic comedy drama film directed and produced by John Ford, and starring John Wayne, Maureen O'Hara, Victor McLaglen, Barry Fitzgerald, Arthur Shields and Ward Bond. The screenplay by Frank S. Nugent was loosely based on a 1933 Saturday Evening Post short story of the same name by Irish author Maurice Walsh, later published as part of a collection titled The Green Rushes. The film features Winton Hoch's lush photography of the Irish countryside and a long, climactic, semi-comic fist fight.

The film was an official selection of the 1952 Venice Film Festival. John Ford won the Academy Award for Best Director, his record fourth, and Winton Hoch won for Best Cinematography. In 2013, the film was selected for preservation in the United States National Film Registry by the Library of Congress as being "culturally, historically, or aesthetically significant".

== Plot ==
In the 1920s, Sean "Trooper Thorn" Thornton, an Irish-born American retired boxer, travels from Pittsburgh to his birthplace of Inisfree to purchase the old family farm. (Note: The spelling of the fictional village "Inisfree" can vary in spelling in some film reviews and articles, often being cited "Innisfree". In the film, however, the public notices announcing the upcoming horse race are boldly printed "INISFREE RACE MEET".) Shortly after arriving, he falls in love with fiery, red-headed Mary Kate Danaher, the sister of bullying Squire "Red" Will Danaher. Will also wants to buy the old Thornton property and is angered when the property's current owner, the wealthy Widow Tillane, accepts Sean's bid instead of his. Will retaliates by refusing consent for Sean to marry his sister.

Some village residents, including parish priest Father Peter Lonergan and local matchmaker-cum-bookmaker Michaeleen Óge Flynn, (Note: Michaeleen’s full name includes "Óge", which in Irish translates to "young" in English. Óge is used to distinguish between a father and his son with the same name, much in the manner that the suffixes "Sr." and "Jr." do in English.) trick Will into believing that Widow Tillane will marry him if Mary Kate is no longer under his roof. He allows the marriage but refuses to give Mary Kate her dowry when he finds that he was deceived and the Widow Tillane knows nothing about the deal. Sean, unschooled in Irish customs, professes no interest in obtaining the dowry. However, to Mary Kate, the dowry represents her value to the community and her freedom. She insists that the dowry must be received to validate their marriage, causing an estrangement between her and Sean. The villagers persuade Will to release Mary Kate's furniture, but he refuses to hand over the monetary part of the dowry (which is his contribution).

Mary Kate believes that Sean is a coward for not fighting Will. Sean goes to the local Church of Ireland minister and fellow former boxer, the Rev. Cyril Playfair, and reveals that he once accidentally killed a younger, married opponent in the ring. He had sworn to give up fighting out of fear and guilt over the incident. Mary Kate also confesses (in Irish) her part in the quarrel to Father Lonergan, who berates her for her selfishness. She and Sean partially reconcile that night, and they share the bedroom for the first time since their marriage.

However, the next morning, Mary Kate leaves their cottage and boards a train for Dublin, hoping this pretense of leaving will spur Sean to action. Sean learns from Michaeleen where she is, races to the railway station, and pulls her off the train. Followed by a growing crowd of villagers, Sean forces Mary Kate to walk with him the five miles (8 km) back to the Danaher farm. There, Sean confronts Will and demands the dowry money. When Will refuses, Sean throws Mary Kate back at her brother, declaring he will abide by the Irish custom "no fortune, no marriage". The ultimatum shocks both Mary Kate and Will, who finally pays the £350 (over £17,000 in 2022). Sean immediately burns it in the boiler, abetted by Mary Kate. She proudly leaves for home, but a humiliated Will takes a swing at Sean, only to be knocked down by Sean's counter-punch.

A donnybrook ensues, then evolves into a long fistfight between Sean and Will after they insincerely agree to adhere to the Marquess of Queensberry rules. This much-anticipated match attracts more and more spectators as it continues for miles across the landscape. The fighters pause for a drink inside Cohan's Bar, where they begrudgingly admit a mutual respect. As they argue over who will pay for the drinks, Will tosses a brew into Sean's face. Sean punches Will, sending him falling through the bar doors to lie unconscious in the street, ending the fight. Later, the reconciled and inebriated brothers-in-law stagger arm-in-arm back to Sean and Mary Kate's home for supper.

The next day, a humbled Will and the Widow Tillane begin their own courtship, and they ride out of the village in a jaunting car driven by Michaeleen. Sean, Mary Kate, and the villagers wave to them before Sean and Mary Kate playfully chase each other across the fields back to the cottage.

== Cast ==
- John Wayne as Sean Thornton
- Maureen O'Hara as Mary Kate Danaher
- Barry Fitzgerald as Michaeleen "Óge" Flynn
- Victor McLaglen as Squire "Red" Will Danaher
- Ward Bond as Father Peter Lonergan
- Mildred Natwick as the Widow Sarah Tillane
- Francis Ford as Dan Tobin
- Arthur Shields as the Rev. Cyril Playfair
- Eileen Crowe as Elizabeth Playfair
- Charles B. Fitzsimons as Hugh Forbes
- James Lilburn as Father Paul
- Séan McClory as Owen Glynn
- Emily Eby as Mave Campbell
- Jack MacGowran as Ignatius Feeney
- May Craig as Fishwoman
- Joseph O'Dea as Molouney
- Eric Gorman as Costello
- Ken Curtis as Dermot Fahy (Note: Fahy sings "A Wild Colonial Boy" after Sean Thornton introduces himself to the men in the first tavern scene. He then corrects Squire Danaher's claim about Sean paying £1000 for a bit of land that is not worth 200. Fahy comments, "Didn't I hear of someone named Danaher bidding to 810?" Danaher tells his assistant Feeney, "Get your book out. Put his name down." Fahy says, "It's F-A-H-Y. No 'E', squireen Danaher.") (uncredited)
- John Wayne's children: Michael, Toni, Patrick, and Melinda made uncredited cameos as children at the horse races.

== Production ==
The film was a departure for Republic Pictures, which backed Ford in what was considered a risky venture at the time. It was the only time the studio, known for low budget B-movies, released a film that would receive an Oscar nomination for Best Picture.

Ford read the story in 1933 and soon purchased the rights to it for $10. The story's author was paid another $2,500 when Republic bought the idea, and he received a final payment of $3,750 when the film was actually made. Republic Pictures agreed to finance the film with O'Hara and Wayne starring and Ford directing, but only if all three agreed to first film a Western with Republic. They did, and after completing Rio Grande, they headed for Ireland to start shooting.

One of the conditions that Republic placed on Ford was that the film run under two hours. However, the finished picture was two hours and nine minutes. When screening the film for Republic executives, Ford stopped the film at approximately two hours in, on the verge of the climactic fistfight. Republic executives relented and allowed the film to run its full length. It was one of the few films that Republic filmed in Technicolor; most of the studio's other color films were made in a cheaper process known as Trucolor.

The film employed many actors from the Irish theatre, including Barry Fitzgerald's brother, Arthur Shields, as well as extras from the Irish countryside, and it is one of the few Hollywood movies in which the Irish language can be heard. Filming commenced on June 7, 1951. All of the outdoor scenes were shot on location in Ireland in County Mayo and County Galway. The inside scenes were filmed toward the end of July at the Republic Studios in Hollywood. Vawn Corrigan reports that Ford made considerable efforts to get the costumes correct for the period with Ó’Maille – The Original House of Style in Galway tasked with sourcing the costumes.

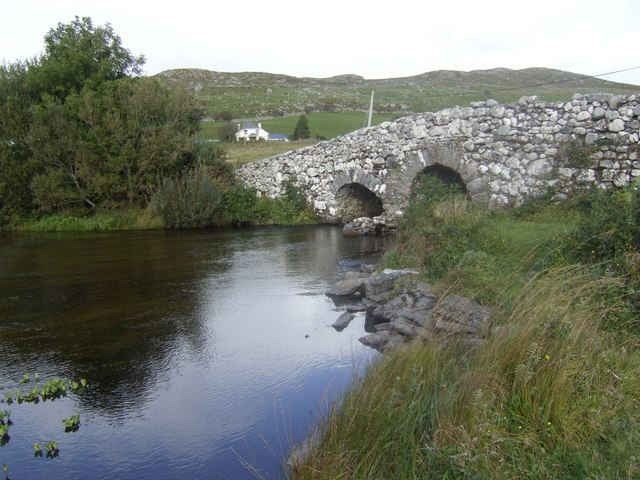
"The Quiet Man Bridge"

The story is set in the fictional community of Inisfree. This is not the same as the Lake Isle of Innisfree, a place in Lough Gill on the Sligo–Leitrim county border made famous by poet William Butler Yeats, which is a tiny island. Many scenes for the film were actually shot in and around the village of Cong, County Mayo, on the grounds of Cong's Ashford Castle. Cong is now a wealthy small town and the castle a 5-star luxury hotel. The connections with the film have led to the area becoming a tourist attraction. In 2008, a pub opened in the building used as the pub in the film (it had actually been a shop at the time when the movie was shot); the pub hosts daily re-runs of the film on DVD. The Quiet Man Fan Club holds its annual general meeting in Ashford Castle. Other locations in the film include Thoor Ballylee, County Galway, home of poet W. B. Yeats for a period; Ballyglunin railway station near Tuam, County Galway, which was filmed as Castletown station; and various places in County Mayo and Connemara, County Galway. Among those are Lettergesh beach, where the horse race scene was filmed, "The Quiet Man Bridge", signposted off the N59 road between Maam Cross and Oughterard and the "White O'Morn" cottage. The latter is located on R336 south of Maam, but long ago fell into ruin.

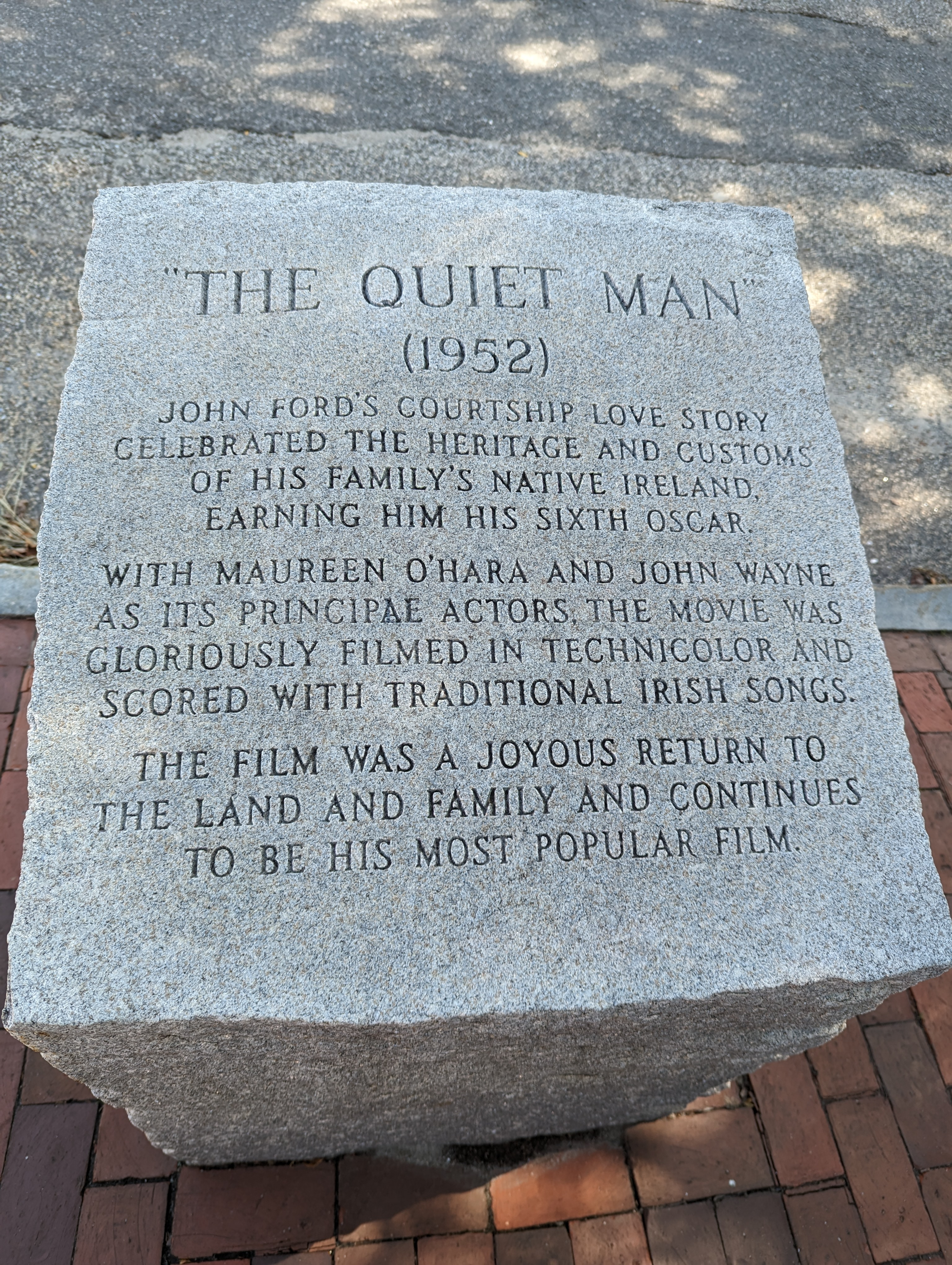
Stone inscription for The Quiet Man at Ford's statue in Portland, Maine.

The film also presents Ford's depiction of an idealized Irish society, with only implied social divisions based on class and differences in political or religious affiliations. The Catholic priest, Father Lonergan, and the Protestant minister, Reverend Playfair, maintain a strong friendly relationship throughout the film, which represented the norm in what was then the Irish Free State, where religious tensions occurred in the 1930s but were the norm only in Northern Ireland. One of the allusions to Anglo-Irish animosity occurs after the happy couple is married and a congratulatory toast offered by Hugh Forbes expresses the wish that they live in "national freedom" (the term national has been censored from most editions) and before the final donnybrook when Thornton demands his wife's dowry from Danaher. Danaher asks Hugh Forbes, who had been commander of the local Irish Republican Army unit during the fight to expel the British, "So the IRA is in this too, ah", to which Forbes replies, "If it were, not a scorched stone of your fine house would be standing."

Ernie O'Malley, an Irish Republican Army officer during the war of independence, commander of the anti-Treaty IRA during the Irish Civil War, and author, acted as an advisor to Ford on the local culture, being on set with him every day. According to O'Hara, Ford "had a great deal of respect for Ernie... He had such respect for Ernie. They would natter away like old buddies... They liked each other. They were friends".

This movie is, in many ways a family affair. Francis Ford, who played the old man who gets up from his deathbed to watch the fight, is John Ford's older brother. Patrick Ford, the director's son, did much of the stunt work for Victor McLaglen during the fight scene, and was a unit director. Arthur Shields (Reverend Playfair), is the younger brother of Barry Fitzgerald (Michaeleen Óge Flynn), who was born William Joseph Shields. Charles B. Fitzsimmons, who played Hugh Forbes, and James O'Hara, who played Father Paul, are the brothers of Maureen O'Hara. In addition, four of John Wayne's children are seen in the horse race scene.

=== Music ===
Ford chose his friend, Hollywood composer Victor Young, to compose the score for the film. Young sprinkled the soundtrack with many Irish airs such as the "Rakes of Mallow" and "The Wild Colonial Boy". One piece of music, chosen by Ford himself, is most prominent: the melody the "Isle of Innisfree", written not by Young, but by the Irish policeman/songwriter Richard Farrelly. The melody of the "Isle of Innisfree", which is first heard over the opening credit sequence with Ashford Castle in the background, becomes the principal musical theme of The Quiet Man. The melody is reprised at least eleven times throughout the film.

The upbeat melody comically hummed by Michaeleen Oge Flynn and later played on the accordion is the "Rakes of Mallow".

A portion of the Irish version of "The Wild Colonial Boy" is played throughout the film.

When Maureen O'Hara died in October 2015, her family stated she listened to music from The Quiet Man during her final hours. Filmmaker George A. Romero was also said to have died listening to the score.

== Reception ==
In 1952 A.H. Weiler of The New York Times viewed the film "as darlin' a picture as we've seen this year," with "dialogue that is as tuneful as a lark's song." In another contemporary review, the entertainment trade paper Variety called the picture "beautifully filmed" and wrote that "Wayne works well under Ford's direction," but found the 129-minute running time "unnecessary." Harrison's Reports described the film as "a delightful and rollicking comedy melodrama of Irish life, directed with skill and acted with gusto by a fine cast." Richard L. Coe of The Washington Post declared it "a complete jim-dandy ... The photography is glorious and Victor Young's score, inspired by folk airs, is a complete joy for an exuberant, vigorous picture." Philip Hamburger of The New Yorker was not so taken with the film, writing, "If I am to believe what I saw in John Ford's sentimental new film, The Quiet Man, practically everybody in Ireland is just as cute as a button," adding, "Mr. Ford's scenes of the Irish countryside are often breathtaking ... but the master who made The Informer appears to have fallen into a vat of treacle."

On the review-aggregation website Rotten Tomatoes, The Quiet Man in 2023 has a 91% approval rating based on reviews from 46 critics. Critical consensus on the website states, "Director John Ford and star John Wayne depart the Western for the Irish countryside, and the result is a beautifully photographed, often comedic romance." Metacritic, which uses a weighted average, assigned the film a score of 85 out of 100, based on 17 critics, indicating "universal acclaim".

The film was also a financial success, grossing $3.8 million in its first year of release. This was among the top ten grosses of the year. It was also the seventh most popular film for British audiences in 1952.

=== Awards and nominations ===
Award	Category	Nominee(s)	Result	Ref.
Academy Awards	Best Motion Picture	John Ford and Merian C. Cooper	Nominated	
Academy Awards	Best Director	John Ford	Won	
Academy Awards	Best Supporting Actor	Victor McLaglen	Nominated	
Academy Awards	Best Screenplay	Frank S. Nugent	Nominated	
Academy Awards	Best Art Direction – Color	Art Direction: Frank Hotaling; Set Decoration: John McCarthy Jr. and Charles Thompson	Nominated	
Academy Awards	Best Cinematography – Color	Winton C. Hoch and Archie Stout	Won	
Academy Awards	Best Sound Recording	Daniel J. Bloomberg	Nominated	
Directors Guild of America Awards	Outstanding Directorial Achievement in Motion Pictures	John Ford	Won	
Golden Globe Awards	Best Director – Motion Picture	John Ford	Nominated	
Golden Globe Awards	Best Original Score – Motion Picture	Victor Young	Nominated	
National Board of Review Awards	Top Ten Films		Won	
National Board of Review Awards	Best Film		Won	
National Film Preservation Board	National Film Registry		Inducted	
Online Film & Television Association Awards	Film Hall of Fame: Productions		Inducted	
Venice International Film Festival	Golden Lion	John Ford	Nominated	
Venice International Film Festival	International Award	John Ford	Won	
Venice International Film Festival	OCIC Award	John Ford	Won	
Venice International Film Festival	Pasinetti Award	John Ford	Won	
Writers Guild of America Awards	Best Written American Comedy	Frank S. Nugent	Won	

== Home media ==
It was first released on DVD December 14, 1998 by Artisan Home Entertainment. It was also released 4 years later on a Collector's edition DVD on October 22, 2002, by Artisan. The Special features on this edition include "The Making of the Quiet Man" Documentary with Leonard Maltin, and "The Joy of Ireland" Documentary with Maureen O'Hara and Andrew V. McLaglen, and "Remembering The Quiet Man Montage".

On January 22, 2013, Olive Films released The Quiet Man on DVD and for the first time on Blu-ray, as a 60th Anniversary Special Edition. It included the documentary "The Making of the Quiet Man" with Leonard Maltin.

In 2010 there was a documentary called Dreaming The Quiet Man made about the journey and making of The Quiet Man. It was narrated by Gabriel Byrne, and had interviews with Peter Bogdanovich, Martin Scorsese, Charles F. Fitzsimons, and Maureen O'Hara. It was released on DVD and Blu-ray for the first time on March 24, 2015.

== In popular culture ==
The scene where John Wayne kisses Maureen O'Hara during a storm appears on a television set in a scene of the 1982 Steven Spielberg film, E.T. The Extra-Terrestrial.

== See also ==
- John Wayne filmography
- Marquess of Queensberry rules of boxing
- Donnybrook!, a 1961 musical adaptation of The Quiet Man written by Johnny Burke
- Innisfree, a 1990 Spanish documentary film about the making of The Quiet Man
- Jaunting car, the horse-drawn vehicle owned by Michaeleen Oge Flynn that is first seen delivering Sean to Innisfree at the beginning of the film. Michaleen is seen using it throughout the film as his main mode of transport and it is in the amusing courting scenes that it plays a greater role.

== Gallery ==
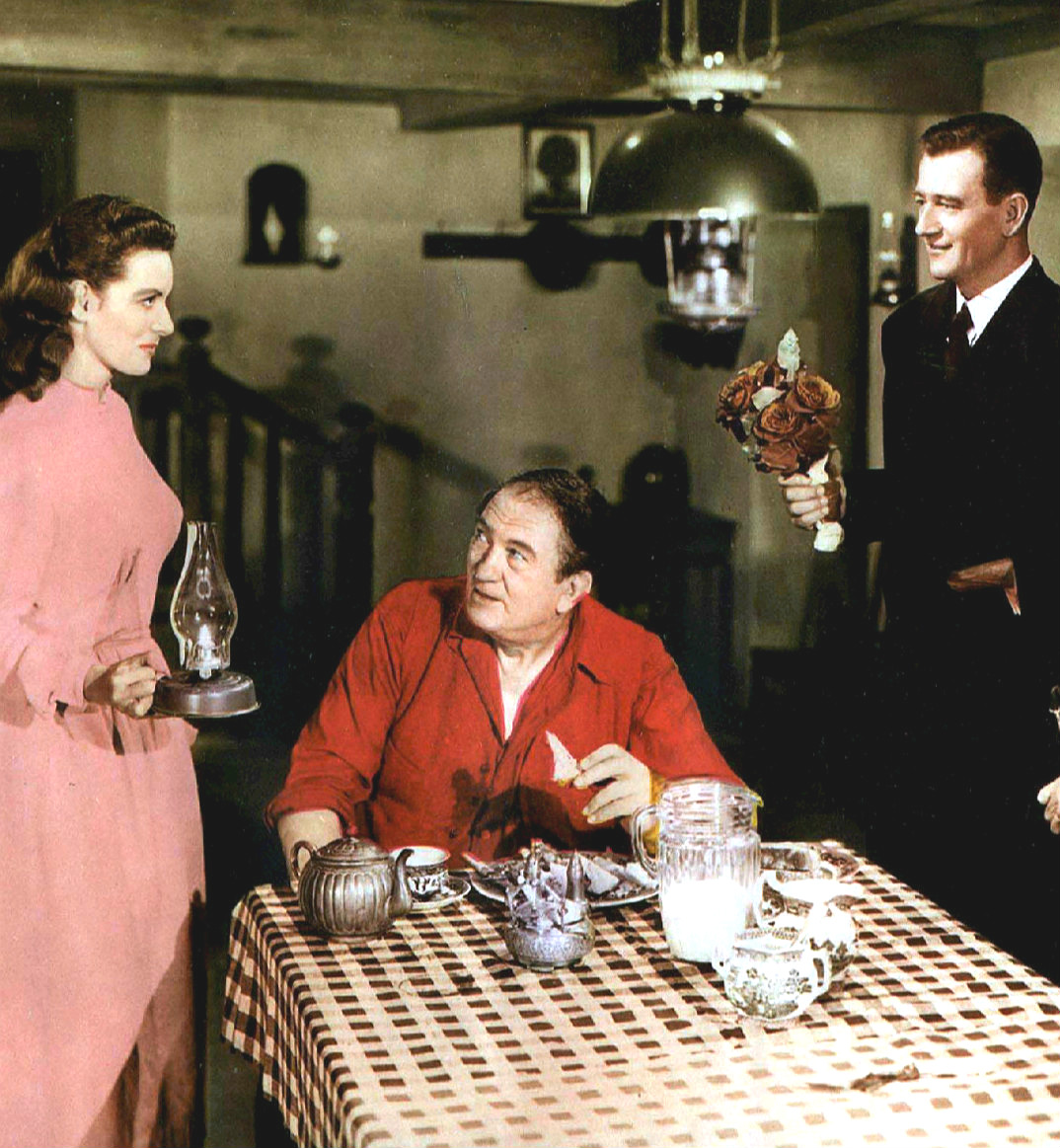

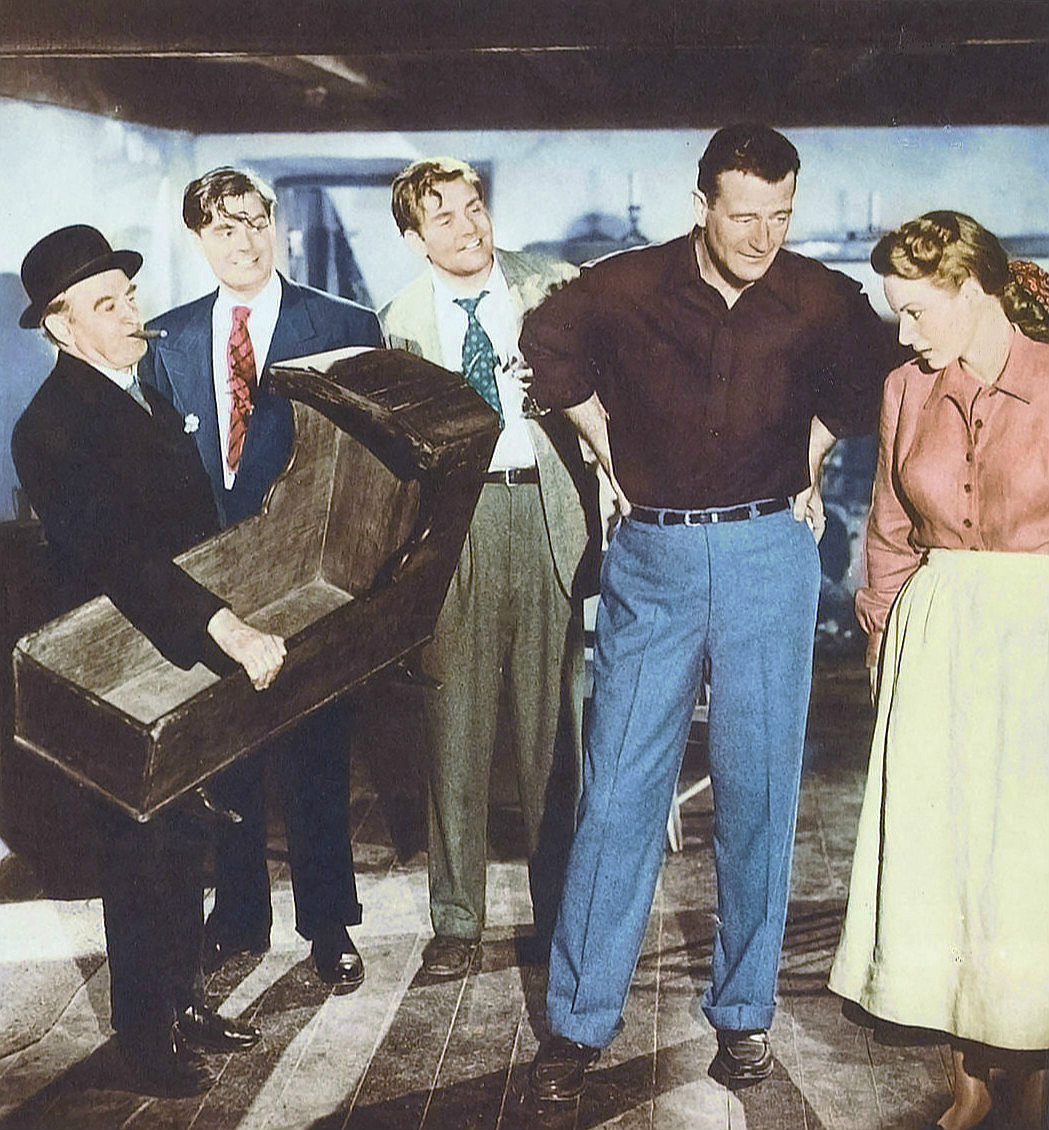

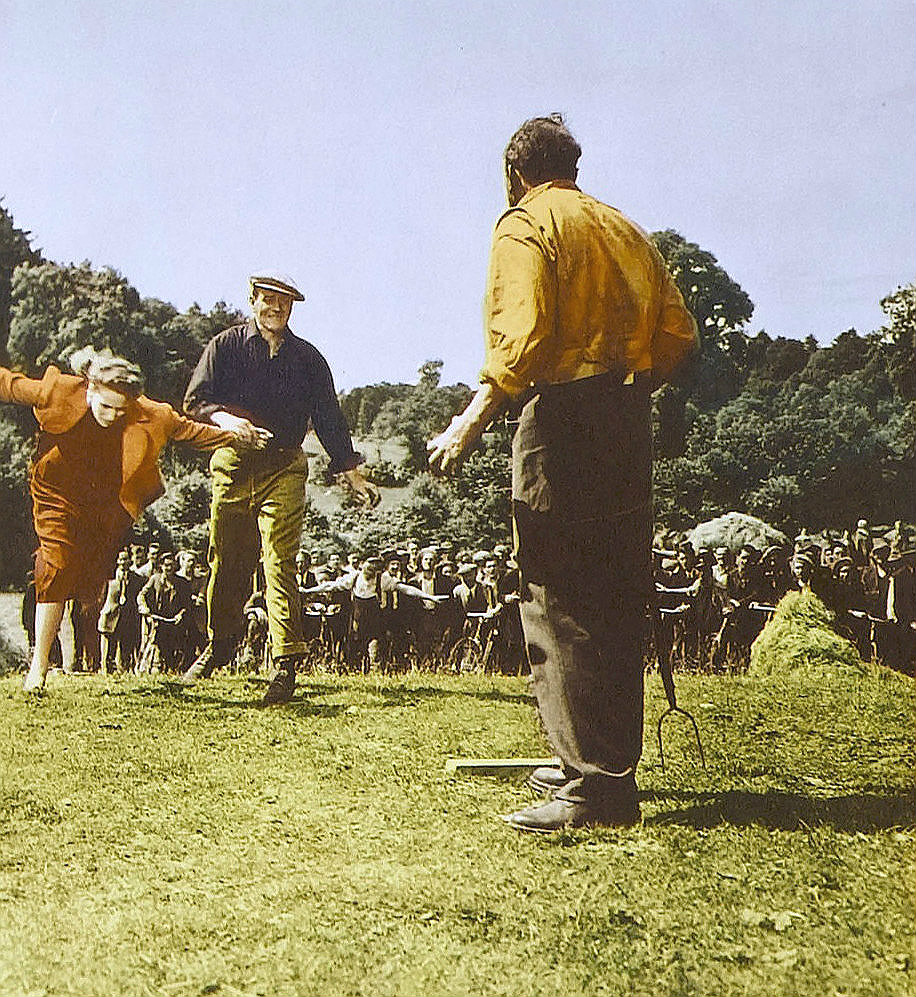

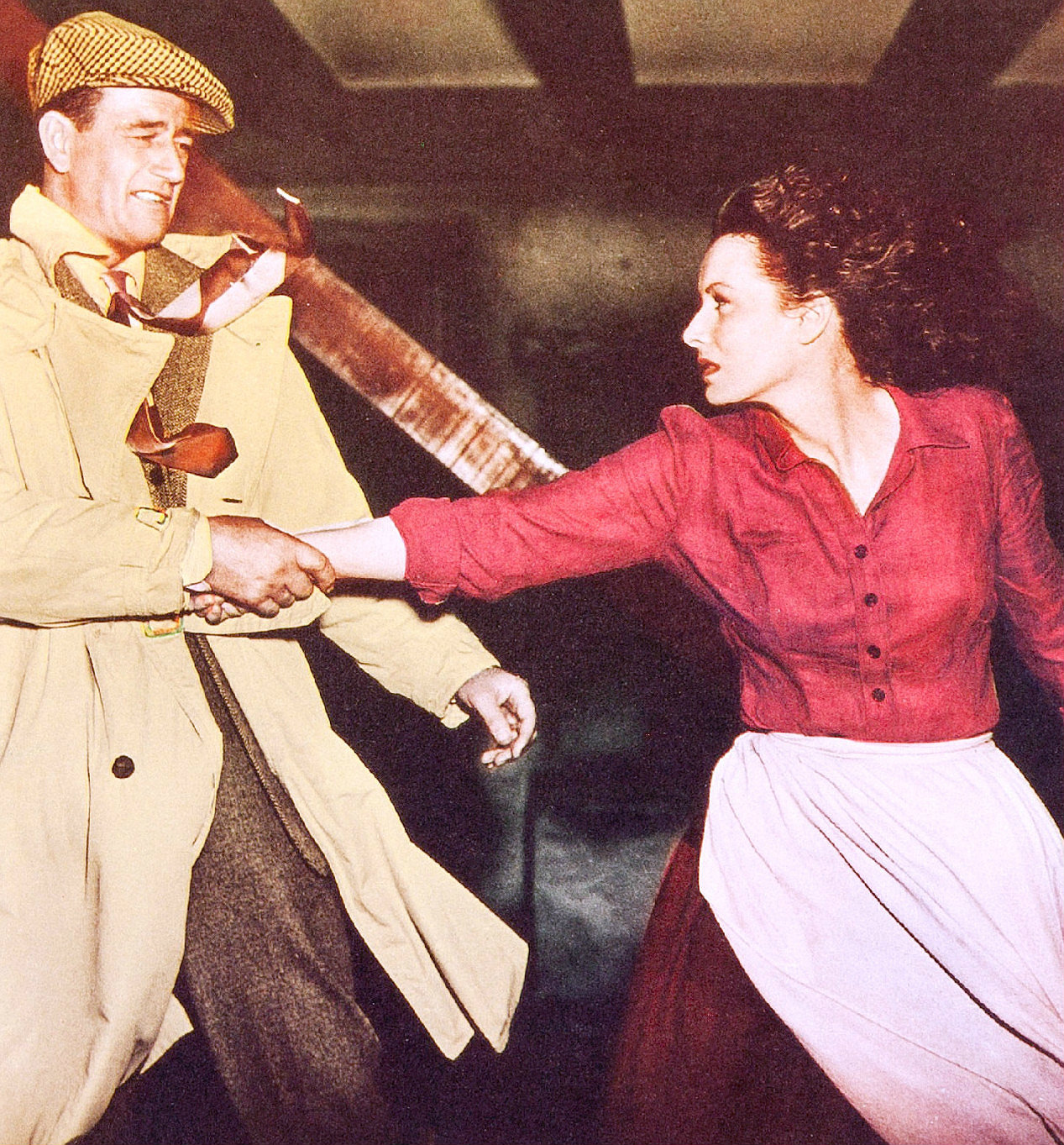

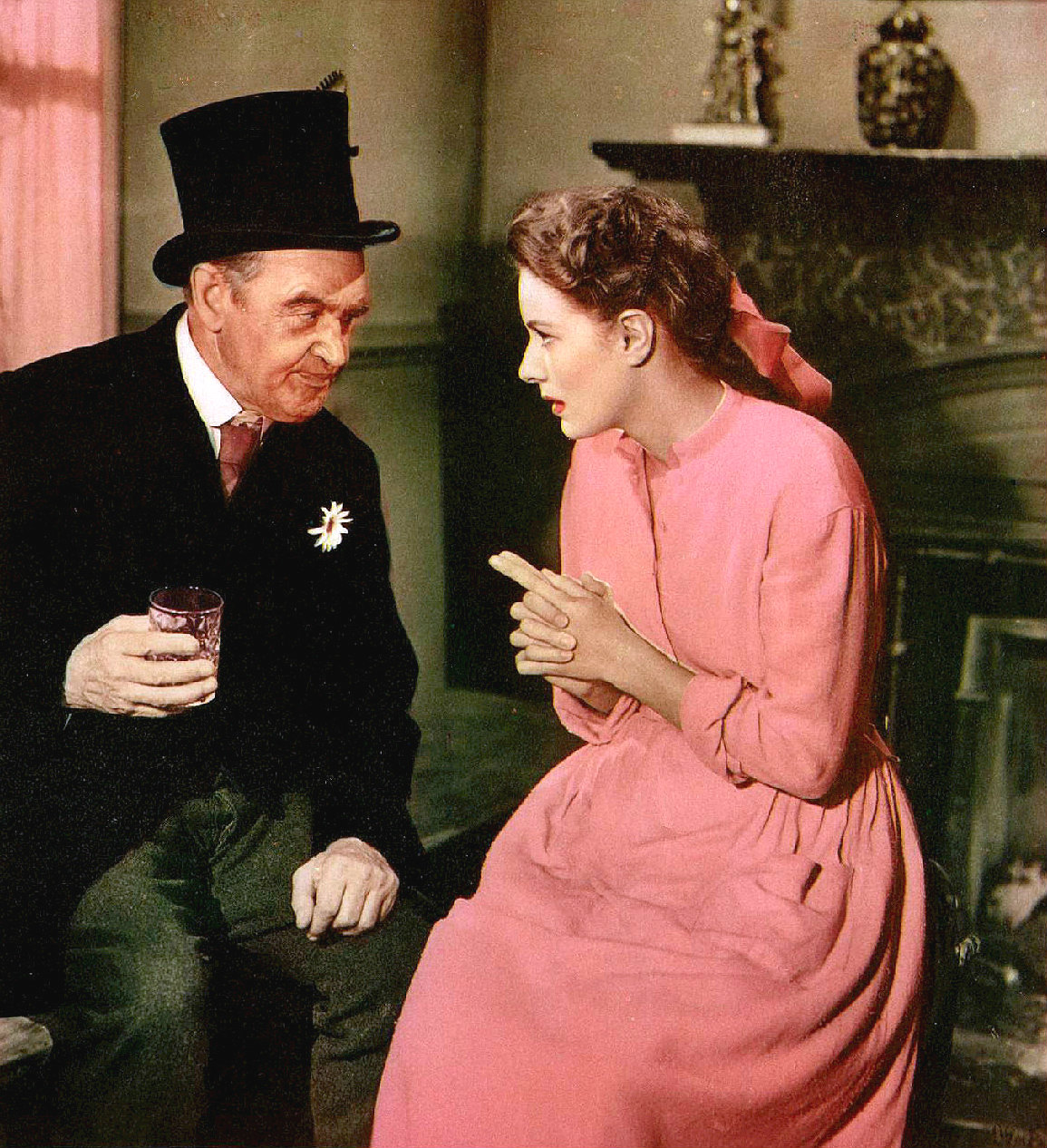

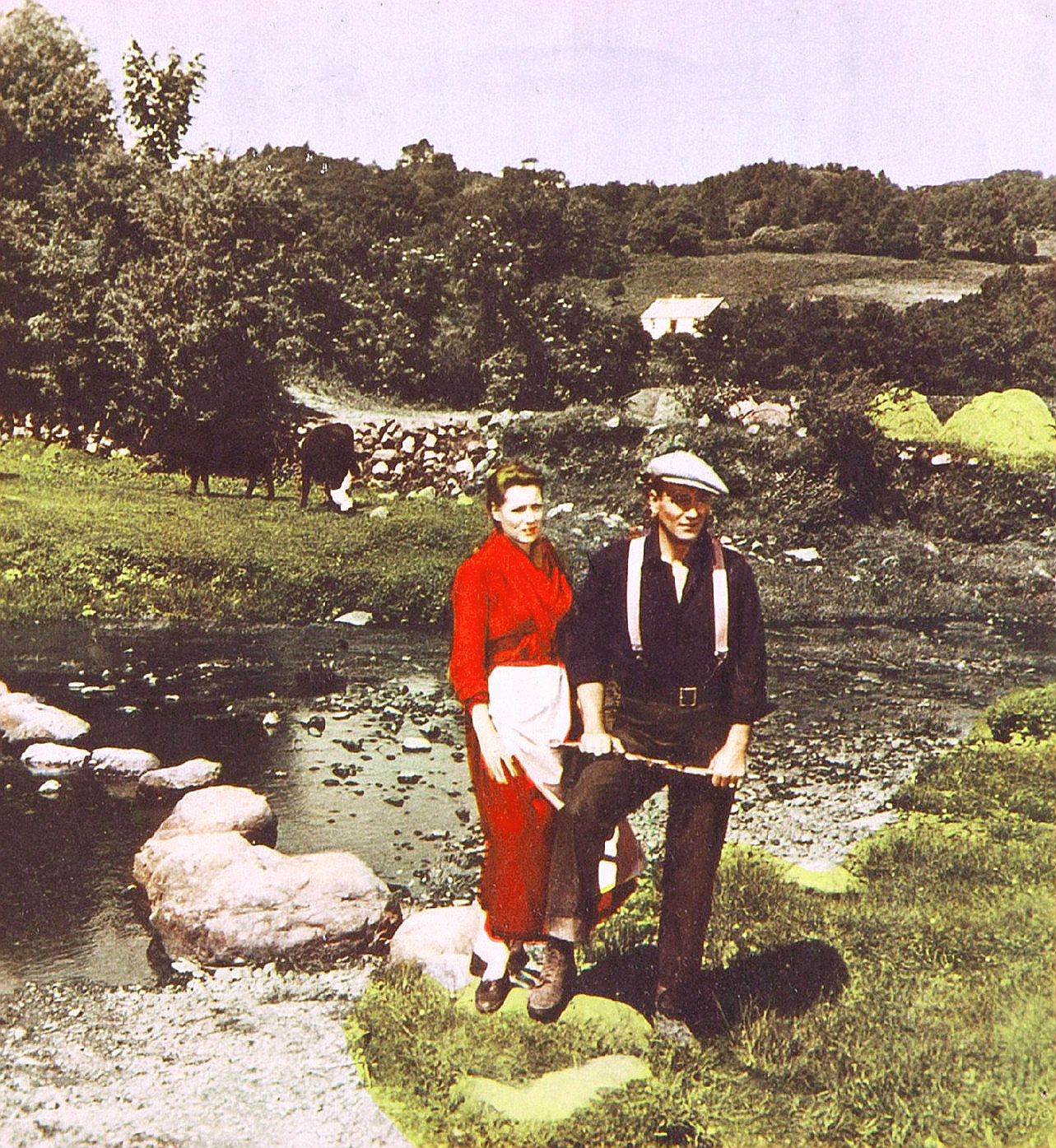
