= Dick Farrelly =

Background information
- Born: Richard Farrelly; 17 February 1916; Kells, County Meath, Ireland
- Died: 11 August 1990 (aged 74)
- Genres: Irish songs, ballads and film themes
- Occupations: Policeman, songwriter and poet

Richard Farrelly (17 February 1916 – 11 August 1990) was an Irish songwriter, policeman and poet, composer of "The Isle of Innisfree", the song for which he is best remembered. His parents were publicans and when Farrelly was twenty-three he left Kells, County Meath for Dublin to join the Irish Police Force. He served in various Garda stations throughout his thirty-eight-year career, ending up in the Central Detective Unit (CDU) Dublin Castle as the pay Sergeant up to his retirement. At heart Farrelly was very much a songwriter and poet. He was a private, modest and shy man who wrote over two hundred songs and poems during his lifetime. He married Anne Lowry from Headford, County Galway in 1955 and the couple had five children. His two sons Dick and Gerard are professional musicians.

== Composed on a bus ==
On a bus journey from his native Kells, Farrelly got the inspiration for his now timeless composition the "Isle of Innisfree" and by the time he reached Dublin he had written the words and music. Farrelly's poignant words express the longing of an Irish emigrant for his native land. It was recorded by Bing Crosby for whom it became a huge international hit. It has since been recorded by a great many artists worldwide but above all, it endures in the hearts of many to this day as one of the great songs of Ireland.

Professor Des MacHale who writes extensively on Dick Farrelly in his book, "Picture The Quiet Man", goes on to say – "Film director John Ford heard it and loved it so much that he decided to use it as the principal musical theme of The Quiet Man... The melody is featured at least eleven times throughout the film, including its use during the opening sequence. "Sadly the composer of The Isle of Innisfree, Richard Farrelly received no mention in the screen credits".

In more recent times "Isle of Innisfree" was also used in the film ET (1982) where a scene from The Quiet Man is shown, and again the melody can be heard in the soundtracks of the films, Distant Voices, Still Lives (1988) and Breakfast on Pluto (2005).

A few years earlier in 1948, Anne Shelton recorded Farrelly's first success, "If You Ever Fall in Love Again", becoming a hit for her in the UK. Guy Lombardo and his Orchestra, instrumental pop group, The Three Suns, and singer Bill Lawrence recorded the song in the USA. Other Farrelly songs include, "Cottage by the Lee", which was popularised by Joe Lynch (singer & actor), and "The Rose of Slievenamon", recorded by Joseph Locke.

== Songs in later years ==
Farrelly continued to write songs throughout his lifetime some of which include:

"The Gypsy Maiden" recorded by Diarmuid O’Leary & The Bards, The Irish Descendants and Sinead Stone & Gerard Farrelly.

"Annaghdown" recorded by Larry Cunningham reaching No 6 in the Irish charts, Sonny Knowles and Sinead Stone & Gerard Farrelly.

"Man of the Road" recorded by The Café Orchestra featuring singer Sinead Stone and a Scottish release by singer Julie Keen.

"We Dreamed our Dreams", written by Farrelly in 1988. It was first recorded by The Fureys & Davy Arthur in that same year. There are also recordings by Sean Keane, Cathy Ryan, The BBC Radio Orchestra featuring Finbar Furey on an album of the same title. There is also a highly acclaimed interpretation of this song by Sinéad Stone and Dick's son, musician Gerard Farrelly on their album "Legacy of a Quiet Man". The album is a collection of songs written by Dick Farrelly and was the subject of an RTÉ television documentary 'Nationwide'. In July 2011 "We Dreamed our Dreams" was covered by Maura O'Connell/Cherish The Ladies in the US.

Farrelly was involved in the Castlebar International Song Contest on several occasions coming runner-up in 1968 with The Gypsy Maiden, winning the Pop section in 1972 with "That's What Love is Made Of" sung by Mary Lou and in 1976 his song "Who's Gonna be the Preacher" reached the finals and was placed 3rd over all.

Farrelly also wrote songs in the Irish language two of which are "Siobhan" and "Seolta Bána" (meaning, White Sails); both songs are recorded for the first time on the album, Legacy of a Quiet Man.

== Isle of Innisfree – Recordings ==
"The Isle of Innisfree" has been recorded by innumerable artists some of which include: Celtic Woman, Tommy Fleming, Sean Tyrell, Bing Crosby, Sinead Stone & Gerard Farrelly, The Cafe Orchestra, Phil Coulter, Anne Shelton, Vera Lynn, Dublin Screen Orchestra – ("The Quiet Man" soundtrack album), Connie Francis, Joe Loss & His Orchestra, Eamonn Cambell, James McNally, Finbar Furey, Paddy Reilly, Frank Patterson, Norrie Paramor & His Orchestra, RTÉ Concert Orchestra, Paddy Cole, Diarmuid O'Leary, Joseph Locke, Charlie Landsborough, Val Doonican, Daniel O'Donnell, Geraldo & His Orchestra, James Galway, John McNally, Jimmy Young, Victor Young & His Singing Strings, The Irish Tenors, Glen Curtin, Dublin City Ramblers, Sean Dunphy, Jimmy Griffin, Tony Kenny and Alec Finn to name but a few.
