= Isle of Innisfree =

Song composed by Dick Farrelly

1950s sheet music front cover of "The Isle of Innisfree". This edition was released to coincide with the song's use as the main theme music of the film The Quiet Man.

The "Isle of Innisfree" is a song composed by Dick Farrelly (Irish songwriter, policeman and poet, born Richard Farrelly), who wrote both the music and lyrics. Farrelly got the inspiration for "Isle of Innisfree", the song for which he is best remembered, while on a bus journey from his native Kells, County Meath to Dublin. The song was published in 1950 by the Peter Maurice Music Publishing Co.

Farrelly’s "Isle of Innisfree" is a haunting melody with lyrics expressing the longing of an Irish emigrant for his native land. When film director John Ford heard the song, he loved it so much that he chose it as the principal theme of his film The Quiet Man. The composition received no mention in the screen credits. "The Isle of Innisfree" became a worldwide hit for Bing Crosby in 1952 and continues to feature in the repertoires of many artists.

There is a common misconception that the song and the famous poem by W. B. Yeats, "Lake Isle of Innisfree", were written about the same place. Yeats's Innisfree was an uninhabited island in Sligo's Lough Gill, whereas Farrelly's Innisfree represented all of Ireland.

The song remains popular and has been recorded by hundreds of artists around the world.

== Films ==
"Isle of Innisfree" is the principal musical theme of the film The Quiet Man (1952). It features in Steven Spielberg's film E.T. the Extra-Terrestrial (1982) when the famous kissing scene between John Wayne and Maureen O'Hara in The Quiet Man is shown. The melody is also included in the soundtracks of the films Distant Voices, Still Lives (1988) and Breakfast on Pluto (2005).

== Analysis ==
The song was also featured in the RTÉ Radio arts programme Rattlebag as one of the top 75 Irish songs of all time in a series entitled "The Story Behind The Songs". Des MacHale (writer and mathematician) and Dick Farrelly's son Gerard were contributors on the programme. There is also a BBC Northern Ireland television series, "Brian Kennedy on Song", in which "Isle of Innisfree" is featured and discussed.

In a chapter entitled "Richard Farrelly and The Isle of Innisfree" of his book Picture The Quiet Man, Professor Des MacHale wrote:

"It is one of the finest and most beautiful melodies ever written, ranking in the opinion of many, right beside Danny Boy and no greater praise is possible. But its appeal is also timeless and international, expressing as it does the trauma of separation from one's birthplace and the ecstasy of returning to the physical soil from which one is sprung... But it is the sheer unanswerable beauty of the melody of Richard Farrelly's The Isle of Innisfree that makes the greatest impact and dwells so deeply in the memory. Here is music dripping with emotion, lush texture, brimming with nostalgia, and fitting so perfectly into the action of The Quiet Man that it could have been written with the movie in mind. No wonder John Ford jumped on it and named the village of Innisfree in its honour".

== Performance history ==
The first public performance of the song was at a social event in the St. Vincent De Paul Hall in Kells, Co. Meath on St. Patrick's Night 1950. The "Isle of Innisfree" and "Seolta Bána" by Dick Farrelly were performed by Sinead Stone and Gerard Farrelly (Dick Farrelly's son) for Irish actress Maureen O'Hara at her induction into the Irish America Hall of Fame at the JFK Heritage Centre in New Ross, County Wexford, in July 2011. In May 2012 they performed the "Isle of Innisfree" and other Dick Farrelly songs for President Michael D. Higgins at the George Bernard Shaw International Conference which took place in the National Gallery of Ireland.
