= List of UK Independent Albums Chart number ones of 2009 =

These are the Official Charts Company's UK Indie Chart number-one albums of 2009.

The biggest-selling indie album of the year was Invaders Must Die by The Prodigy.

== Chart history ==
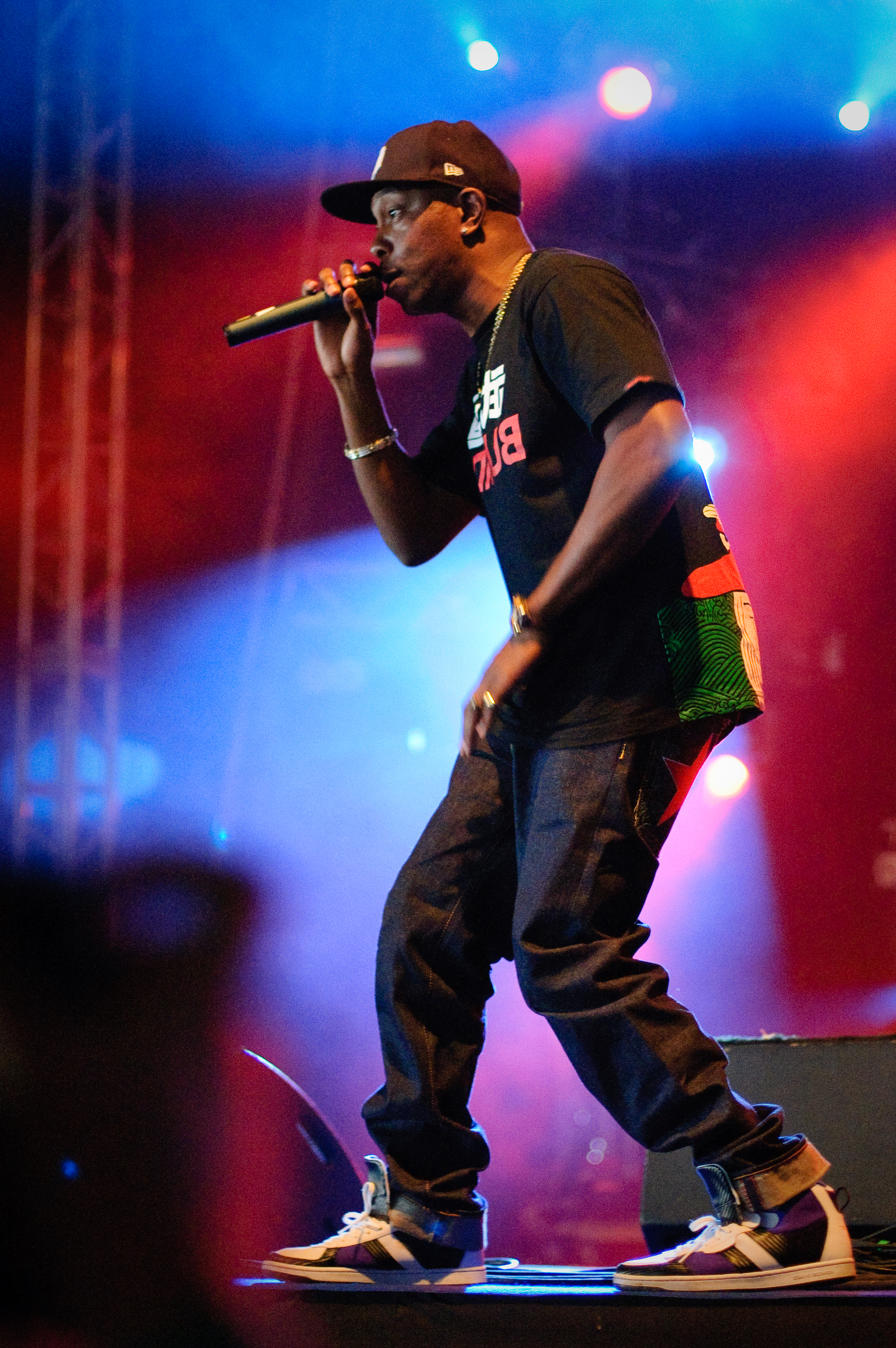
British rapper Dizzee Rascal topped the chart with Tongue n' Cheek.

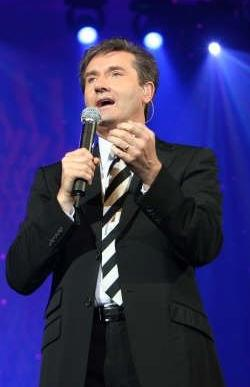
Daniel O'Donnell reached number one with his album Peace in the Valley.

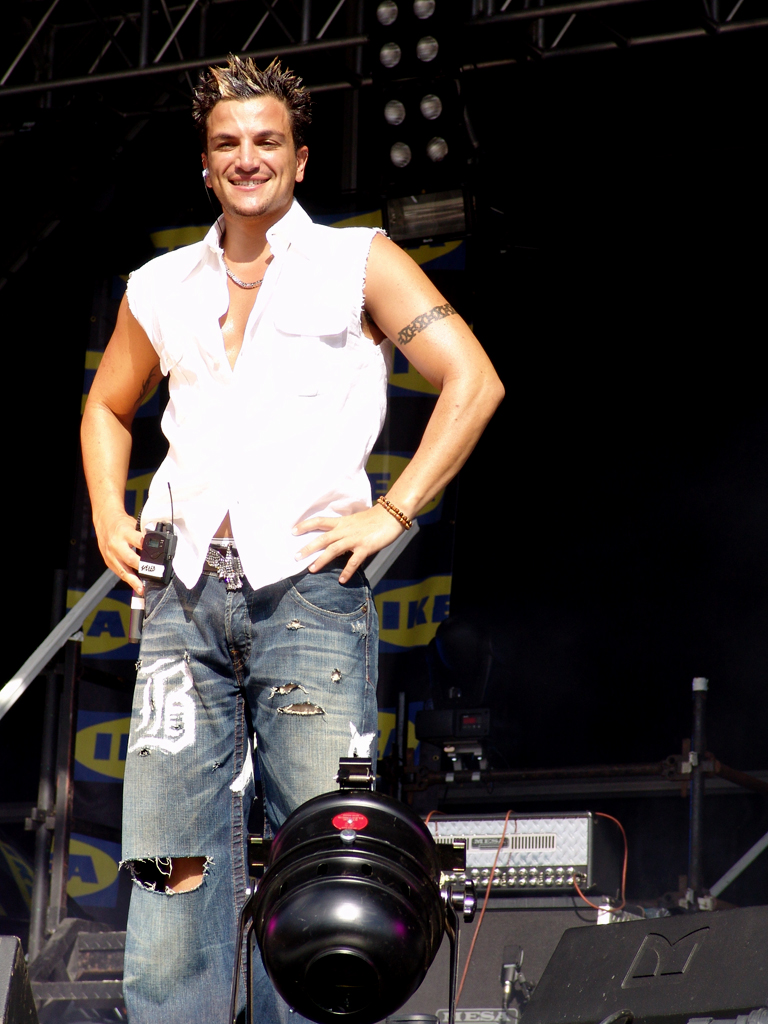
Peter Andre topped the UK Indie Chart with Revelation.

Issue date	Album	Artist(s)	Record label	Ref.
4 January	Vampire Weekend	Vampire Weekend	XL	
11 January	Vampire Weekend	Vampire Weekend	XL	
18 January	Merriweather Post Pavilion	Animal Collective	Domino	
25 January	The Crying Light	Antony & the Johnsons	Rough Trade	
1 February	Tonight	Franz Ferdinand	Domino	
8 February	Tonight	Franz Ferdinand	Domino	
15 February	19	Adele	XL	
22 February	Dog House Music	Seasick Steve	Bronzerat	
1 March	Dog House Music	Seasick Steve	Bronzerat	
8 March	Everyday Demons	The Answer	Albert	
15 March	Dig Out Your Soul	Oasis	Big Brother	
22 March	Dig Out Your Soul	Oasis	Big Brother	
29 March	Junior	Röyksopp	Wall of Sound	
5 April	Dig Out Your Soul	Oasis	Big Brother	
12 April	Dig Out Your Soul	Oasis	Big Brother	
19 April	Dark Days/Light Years	Super Furry Animals	Rough Trade	
26 April	Be Human	Fightstar	Search and Destroy	
3 May	Be Human	Fightstar	Search and Destroy	
10 May	Primary Colours	The Horrors	XL	
17 May	Quicken the Heart	Maxïmo Park	Warp	
24 May	The Liberty of Norton Folgate	Madness	Lucky 7	
31 May	Veckatimest	Grizzly Bear	Warp	
7 June	The Liberty of Norton Folgate	Madness	Lucky 7	
14 June	Battle for the Sun	Placebo	Dreambrother	
21 June	Battle for the Sun	Placebo	Dreambrother	
28 June	Invaders Must Die	The Prodigy	Take Me to the Hospital	
5 July	Flying High	Ali Campbell	Jacaranda	
12 July	Invaders Must Die	The Prodigy	Take Me to the Hospital	
19 July	Invaders Must Die	The Prodigy	Take Me to the Hospital	
26 July	Invaders Must Die	The Prodigy	Take Me to the Hospital	
2 August	The Best Of: 1996–2008	Chicane	Modena	
9 August	The Best Of: 1996–2008	Chicane	Modena	
16 August	The Best Of: 1996–2008	Chicane	Modena	
23 August	The Best Of: 1996–2008	Chicane	Modena	
30 August	Humbug	The Arctic Monkeys	Domino	
6 September	Humbug	The Arctic Monkeys	Domino	
13 September	Humbug	The Arctic Monkeys	Domino	
20 September	Revelation	Peter Andre	Conehead	
27 September	Tongue n' Cheek	Dizzee Rascal	Dirtee Stank	
4 October	Tongue n' Cheek	Dizzee Rascal	Dirtee Stank	
11 October	Tongue n' Cheek	Dizzee Rascal	Dirtee Stank	
18 October	Tongue n' Cheek	Dizzee Rascal	Dirtee Stank	
25 October	Tongue n' Cheek	Dizzee Rascal	Dirtee Stank	
1 November	Peace in the Valley	Daniel O'Donnell	DMG TV	
8 November	Revelation	Peter Andre	Conehead	
15 November	Revelation	Peter Andre	Conehead	
22 November	Revelation	Peter Andre	Conehead	
29 November	Revelation	Peter Andre	Conehead	
6 December	Revelation	Peter Andre	Conehead	
13 December	Revelation	Peter Andre	Conehead	
20 December	Revelation	Peter Andre	Conehead	
27 December	Tongue n' Cheek	Dizzee Rascal	Dirtee Stank	

== See also ==
- List of number-one albums of 2009 (UK)
- List of UK Dance Chart number-one albums of 2009
- List of UK Indie Chart number-one singles of 2009
- List of UK Rock Chart number-one albums of 2009
- List of UK R&B Chart number-one albums of 2009
