= 412 Days of Rock 'n' Roll =

Live album & DVD by The Answer
- Released: 13 June 2011
- Recorded: 2009–2011
- Genre: Hard rock, blues rock
- Length: 55:51
- Label: Spinefarm Records
- Producer: Paul Hussey, The Answer, Neal Calderwood

The Answer live albums chronology
Live at Planet Rock Xmas Party (2008)	412 Days of Rock 'n' Roll (2011)

The Answer video video chronology
412 Days of Rock 'n' Roll (2011)

Singles from 412 Days of Rock 'n' Roll
- 1. "Rock 'n' Roll Outlaw" Released: 16 April 2011

412 Days of Rock 'n' Roll is a live album and DVD by Northern Irish rock band The Answer, released on 13 June 2011. The DVD features a documentary following the band's stint as a support act on AC/DC's Black Ice World Tour. According to lead singer Cormac Neeson, the band played 118 shows with AC/DC and "as many of our own headline shows and radio sessions as we could squeeze into the schedule." The DVD also includes an approximately 60 minute-long live set, which also features on the CD, and all of the band's nine promo videos. In addition to the live set, the CD features a cover of Rose Tattoo's "Rock 'n' Roll Outlaw" and a previously unreleased demo track.

== Track listing ==
All songs written by James Heatley, Paul Mahon, Cormac Neeson and Micky Waters, except where noted.

CD
No.	Title	Writer(s)	Length
1.	"Tonight" (live in Houston)		5:17
2.	"On and On" (live in Houston)		3:48
3.	"Demon Eyes" (live in Dallas)		4:24
4.	"Too Far Gone" (live in Dallas)		5:12
5.	"Comfort Zone" (live in Dallas)		4:26
6.	"Come Follow Me" (live in Belfast)		5:08
7.	"Walkin' Mat" (live in Belfast)		4:51
8.	"Under the Sky" (live in Belfast)		6:49
9.	"Preachin'" (live in Belfast)		8:34
10.	"Rock 'n' Roll Outlaw" (Rose Tattoo cover)	Gary Anderson, Michael Cocks, Gordon Leach, Dallas Royall, Peter Wells	3:45
11.	"Fooled Me" (demo)		3:38

== Personnel ==
The Answer

- Cormac Neeson — lead vocals, harmonica
- Paul Mahon — guitars, vocals
- Micky Waters — bass, vocals
- James Heatley — drums, vocals

Production

- Nick Arthur — editing
- Paul Hussey — producer
- Barry Barnes — director
- James Cassidy — executive producer
- Declan Maynes — compiling, editing, project co-ordination
- Paul 'Pab' Boothroyd — recording (tracks 1–5)
- Dan Dabrowski — recording (tracks 1–9)
- Guillermo 'Will' Maya — mixing (tracks 1–9)
- Shawn Joseph — mastering
- The Answer — recording, production (tracks 10–11)
- Neal Calderwood — recording, production (tracks 10–11), mixing (track 11)
- Mike Fraser — mixing (track 10)
