= Speak Now (disambiguation) =

Speak Now, a 2010 album by Taylor Swift.

- Speak Now (Taylor's Version), a re-recording of the album, 2023

Speak Now may also refer to:

== Music ==
- "Speak Now" (song), a song by Taylor Swift
- Speak Now World Tour, a tour by Taylor Swift
- Speak Now World Tour – Live, a live album by Taylor Swift
- Speak Now (Moneybagg Yo album), 2024
- "Speak Now", a song by The Answer from New Horizon (The Answer album) (2013)
- "Speak Now", a song by Leslie Odom Jr. from One Night in Miami... (2020)
- "Speak Now or Forever Hold Your Peace", a song by Cheap Trick from Cheap Trick (1977 album)

== Other uses ==
- Speak Now, 1971 play by Olwen Wymark
- Speak Now, 2003 novel by Kaylie Jones
- "Speak Now", 2004 episode of The Dead Zone (TV series) with Ellie Harvie
- Speak Now, 2013 film premiered at Austin Film Festival with Abby Miller
