= List of UK R&B Singles Chart number ones of 2009 =

The logo of the Official Charts Company, responsible for compiling all of the official music charts in the United Kingdom, including the R&B singles chart.

The UK R&B Chart is a weekly chart that ranks the 40 biggest-selling singles and albums that are classified in the R&B genre in the United Kingdom. The chart is compiled by the Official Charts Company, and is based on both physical and digital sales. This is a list of The Official UK Charts Company R&B hits of 2009.

== Number ones ==
Key
| † | Best-selling R&B single of the year |

| Issue date | Single | Artist |
|---|---|---|
| 4 January | "If I Were a Boy" | Beyoncé |
| 11 January | "If I Were a Boy" | Beyoncé |
| 18 January | "Single Ladies (Put a Ring on It)" | Beyoncé |
| 25 January | "Single Ladies (Put a Ring on It)" | Beyoncé |
| 1 February | "Single Ladies (Put a Ring on It)" | Beyoncé |
| 8 February | "Crack a Bottle" | Eminem featuring Dr. Dre & 50 Cent |
| 15 February | "Crack a Bottle" | Eminem featuring Dr. Dre & 50 Cent |
| 22 February | "T-Shirt" | Shontelle |
| 1 March | "Dead and Gone" | T.I. featuring Justin Timberlake |
| 8 March ^{A} | "Right Round" | Flo Rida featuring Ke$ha |
| 15 March | "Right Round" | Flo Rida featuring Ke$ha |
| 22 March | "Right Round" | Flo Rida featuring Ke$ha |
| 29 March | "Right Round" | Flo Rida featuring Ke$ha |
| 5 April | "Right Round" | Flo Rida featuring Ke$ha |
| 12 April | "Love Sex Magic" | Ciara featuring Justin Timberlake |
| 19 April | "Love Sex Magic" | Ciara featuring Justin Timberlake |
| 26 April ^{A} | "Number 1" | Tinchy Stryder featuring N-Dubz |
| 3 May ^{A} | "Number 1" | Tinchy Stryder featuring N-Dubz |
| 10 May ^{A} | "Number 1" | Tinchy Stryder featuring N-Dubz |
| 17 May ^{A} | "Boom Boom Pow" | The Black Eyed Peas |
| 24 May | "Boom Boom Pow" | The Black Eyed Peas |
| 31 May | "Boom Boom Pow" | The Black Eyed Peas |
| 7 June ^{A} | "Boom Boom Pow" | The Black Eyed Peas |
| 14 June | "Boom Boom Pow" | The Black Eyed Peas |
| 21 June | "Boom Boom Pow" | The Black Eyed Peas |
| 28 June | "Boom Boom Pow" | The Black Eyed Peas |
| 5 July | "Man in the Mirror" | Michael Jackson |
| 12 July | "Man in the Mirror" | Michael Jackson |
| 19 July ^{A} | "Beat Again" | JLS |
| 26 July ^{A} | "Beat Again" | JLS |
| 2 August ^{A} | "I Gotta Feeling" † | The Black Eyed Peas |
| 9 August ^{A} | "Never Leave You" | Tinchy Stryder featuring Amelle |
| 16 August ^{A} | "I Gotta Feeling" † | The Black Eyed Peas |
| 23 August | "I Gotta Feeling" † | The Black Eyed Peas |
| 30 August | "I Gotta Feeling" † | The Black Eyed Peas |
| 6 September ^{A} | "Run This Town" | Jay-Z featuring Rihanna and Kanye West |
| 13 September | "Run This Town" | Jay-Z featuring Rihanna and Kanye West |
| 20 September ^{A} | "Break Your Heart" | Taio Cruz |
| 27 September ^{A} | "Break Your Heart" | Taio Cruz |
| 4 October ^{A} | "Break Your Heart" | Taio Cruz |
| 11 October ^{A} | "Oopsy Daisy" | Chipmunk featuring Ms D |
| 18 October | "Oopsy Daisy" | Chipmunk featuring Ms D |
| 25 October | "Oopsy Daisy" | Chipmunk featuring Ms D |
| 1 November | "Down" | Jay Sean featuring Lil Wayne |
| 8 November ^{A} | "Everybody in Love" | JLS |
| 15 November ^{A} | "Meet Me Halfway" | The Black Eyed Peas |
| 22 November | "Meet Me Halfway" | The Black Eyed Peas |
| 29 November | "Whatcha Say" | Jason Derülo |
| 6 December | "Russian Roulette" | Rihanna |
| 13 December | "Russian Roulette" | Rihanna |
| 20 December | "Russian Roulette" | Rihanna |
| 27 December | "Meet Me Halfway" | The Black Eyed Peas |

Notes

- ^{A} – Was simultaneously number-one that week on the UK Singles Chart

== Year-end statistics ==
- Best selling number one R&B single – "I Gotta Feeling" by Black Eyed Peas, sales of 848,000
- Best selling number one R&B artist – Black Eyed Peas, combined sales of 2,033,000
- Most weeks at number one (single, consecutive) – "Boom Boom Pow" by Black Eyed Peas, 7 weeks
- Most weeks at number one (single, non-consecutive) "I Gotta Feeling" by Black Eyed Peas, 4 weeks
- Most weeks at number one (artist, consecutive) – Black Eyed Peas, 7 weeks
- Most weeks at number one (artist, non-consecutive) – Black Eyed Peas, 14 weeks

== See also ==
- List of UK Singles Chart number ones of the 2000s
- List of UK Dance Singles Chart number ones of 2009
- List of UK Independent Singles Chart number ones of 2009
- List of UK Singles Downloads Chart number ones of the 2000s
- List of UK Rock & Metal Singles Chart number ones of 2009
- List of UK R&B Albums Chart number ones of 2009
