= List of UK Dance Albums Chart number ones of 2009 =

These are the Official Charts Company's UK Dance Chart number-one albums of 2009. The dates listed in the menus below represent the Saturday after the Sunday the chart was announced, as per the way the dates are given in chart publications such as the ones produced by Billboard, Guinness, and Virgin.

== Chart history ==
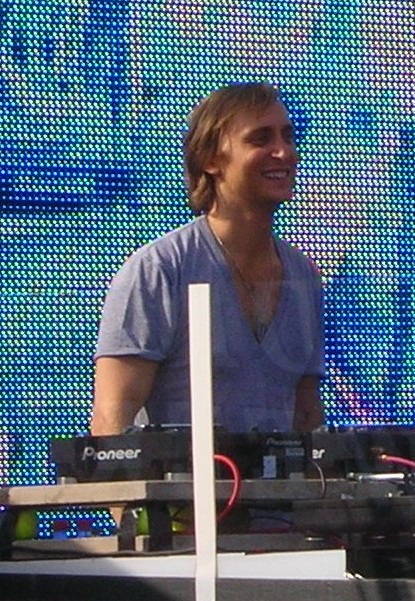
David Guetta reached number one with his album One Love.

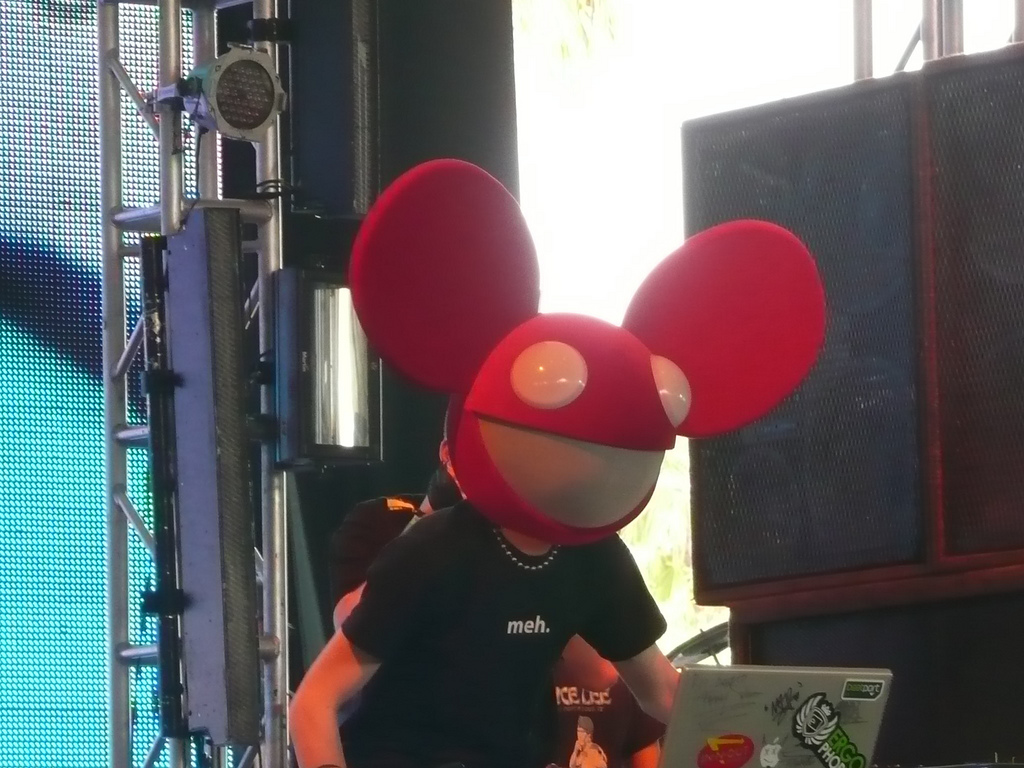
deadmau5 topped the UK Dance Chart with For Lack of a Better Name.

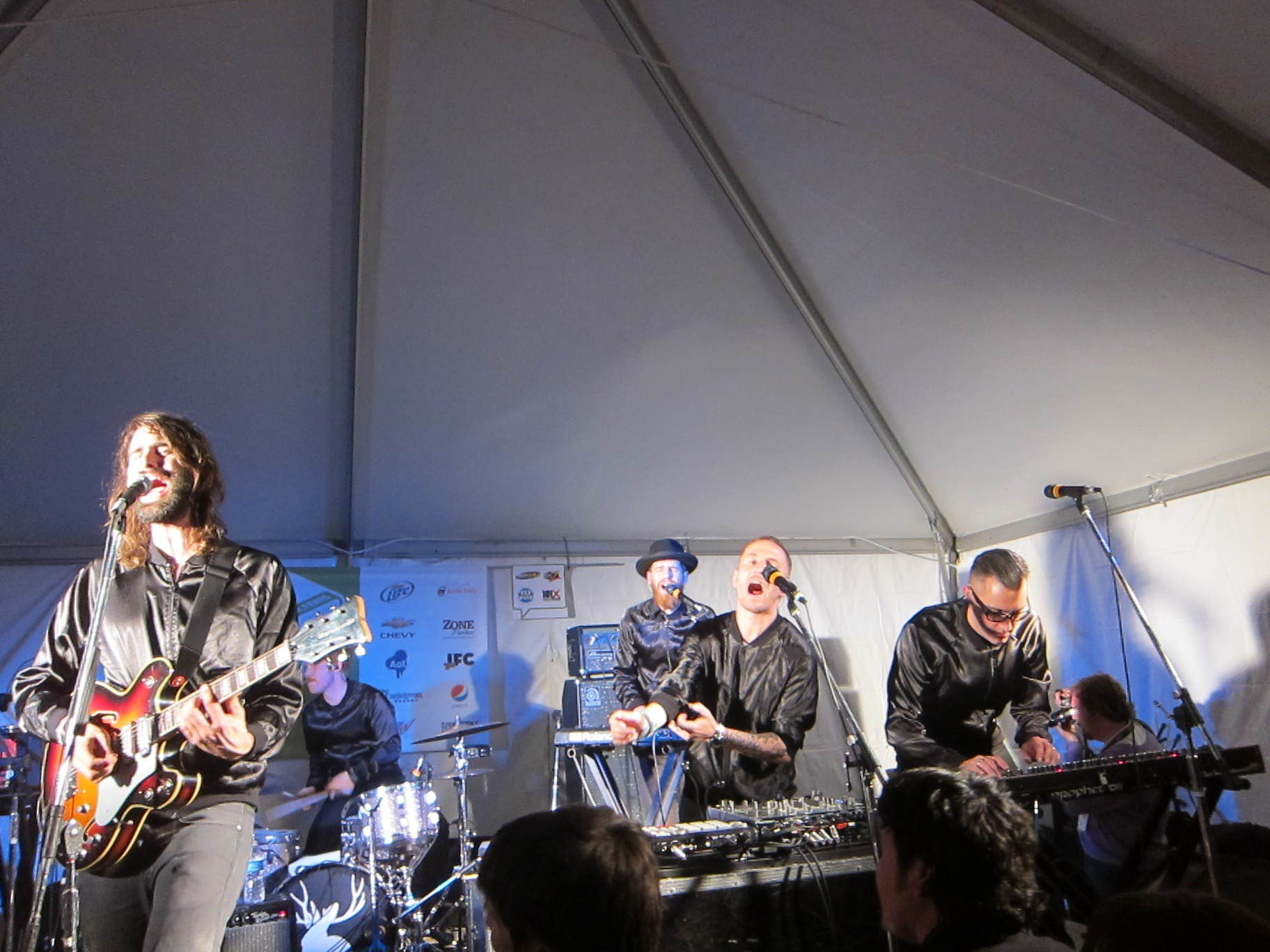
Swedish band Miike Snow reached number one with their debut album Miike Snow.

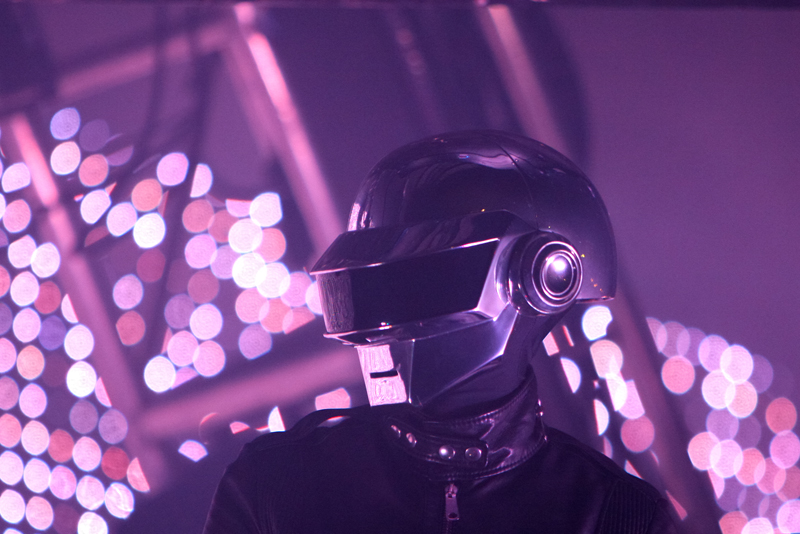
Discovery by Daft Punk topped the dance chart again, more than eight years after it was originally released.

Issue date	Album	Artist(s)	Record label	Ref.
3 January	Anthems 2 - 1991-2009	Various Artists	Ministry of Sound	
10 January	Anthems 2 - 1991-2009	Various Artists	Ministry of Sound	
17 January	Clubber Guide 2009	Various Artists	Ministry of Sound	
24 January	Clubber Guide 2009	Various Artists	Ministry of Sound	
31 January	The Sound of Bassline 2	Various Artists	Ministry of Sound	
7 February	The Sound of Bassline 2	Various Artists	Ministry of Sound	
14 February	Saturday Night Club Classics	Various Artists	Ministry of Sound	
21 February	Saturday Night Club Classics	Various Artists	Ministry of Sound	
28 February	Walking on a Dream	Empire of the Sun	Virgin	
7 March	Invaders Must Die	The Prodigy	Take Me to the Hospital	
14 March	Invaders Must Die	The Prodigy	Take Me to the Hospital	
21 March	Invaders Must Die	The Prodigy	Take Me to the Hospital	
28 March	Invaders Must Die	The Prodigy	Take Me to the Hospital	
4 April	Invaders Must Die	The Prodigy	Take Me to the Hospital	
11 April	Invaders Must Die	The Prodigy	Take Me to the Hospital	
18 April	Invaders Must Die	The Prodigy	Take Me to the Hospital	
25 April	Invaders Must Die	The Prodigy	Take Me to the Hospital	
2 May	Invaders Must Die	The Prodigy	Take Me to the Hospital	
9 May	Invaders Must Die	The Prodigy	Take Me to the Hospital	
16 May	Invaders Must Die	The Prodigy	Take Me to the Hospital	
23 May	Invaders Must Die	The Prodigy	Take Me to the Hospital	
30 May	Chilled 2 - 1991-2009	Various Artists	Ministry of Sound	
6 June	Chilled 2 - 1991-2009	Various Artists	Ministry of Sound	
13 June	Chilled 2 - 1991-2009	Various Artists	Ministry of Sound	
20 June	Chilled 2 - 1991-2009	Various Artists	Ministry of Sound	
27 June	Chilled 2 - 1991-2009	Various Artists	Ministry of Sound	
4 July	Chilled 2 - 1991-2009	Various Artists	Ministry of Sound	
11 July	Wait for Me	Moby	Little Idiot	
18 July	Gatecrasher's Trance Anthems 1993 - 2009	Various Artists	Rhino	
25 July	Gatecrasher's Trance Anthems 1993 - 2009	Various Artists	Rhino	
1 August	Gatecrasher's Trance Anthems 1993 - 2009	Various Artists	Rhino	
8 August	The Best Of: 1996–2008	Chicane	Modena	
15 August	The Best Of: 1996–2008	Chicane	Modena	
22 August	The Best Of: 1996–2008	Chicane	Modena	
29 August	Ready for the Weekend	Calvin Harris	Columbia	
5 September	One Love	David Guetta	Positiva/Virgin	
12 September	One Love	David Guetta	Positiva/Virgin	
19 September	One Love	David Guetta	Positiva/Virgin	
26 September	One Love	David Guetta	Positiva/Virgin	
3 October	One Love	David Guetta	Positiva/Virgin	
10 October	Yeah Ghost	Zero 7	Atlantic	
17 October	For Lack of a Better Name	deadmau5	Virgin	
24 October	For Lack of a Better Name	deadmau5	Virgin	
31 October	One Love	David Guetta	Positiva/Virgin	
7 November	Miike Snow	Miike Snow	Columbia	
14 November	The Annual 2010	Various Artists	Ministry of Sound	
21 November	Clubland 16	Various Artists	AATW/UMTV	
28 November	Clubland 16	Various Artists	AATW/UMTV	
5 December	Ministry of Sound – One	Various Artists	Ministry of Sound	
12 December	Discovery	Daft Punk	Virgin	
19 December	Ministry of Sound – One	Various Artists	Ministry of Sound	
26 December	Ministry of Sound – One	Various Artists	Ministry of Sound	

== See also ==
- List of number-one albums of 2009 (UK)
- List of UK Dance Singles Chart number ones of 2009
- List of UK Independent Singles Chart number ones of 2009
- List of UK Independent Singles Chart number ones of 2009
- List of UK R&B Albums Chart number ones of 2009
