= Live at Planet Rock Xmas Party =

Live album by The Answer
- Released: 6 October 2008
- Recorded: 11 December 2007 at Islington Academy, London
- Genre: Hard rock

The Answer chronology
Rise: Special Edition (2007)	Live at Planet Rock Xmas Party (2008)	Everyday Demons (2009)

Live at Planet Rock Xmas Party is the first of a planned series of 'official bootlegs' by Northern Irish rock band The Answer. It was recorded live at the Islington Academy in London on 11 December 2007 for the radio station Planet Rock. During the concert Paul Rodgers joined the band on stage to sing two songs, "I'm a Mover" and "The Hunter", from his former band Free's debut album Tons of Sobs with the group.

The CD was limited to only 1,500 copies and was exclusively available for purchase through the band's website and at live concerts.

== Track listing ==
No.	Title	Length
1.	"Never Too Late"
2.	"Revolutions"
3.	"Come Follow Me"
4.	"All I Know"
5.	"Keep Believin'"
6.	"I'm a Mover"
7.	"Sometimes Your Love"
8.	"Under the Sky"
9.	"The Hunter"
10.	"Preachin'"

== Personnel ==
- Cormac Neeson - Lead vocals
- Paul Mahon - Guitar
- Micky Waters - Bass
- James Heatley - Drums
- Paul Rodgers - Guest vocals on track 6 and track 9
