= List of UK Independent Singles Chart number ones of 2009 =

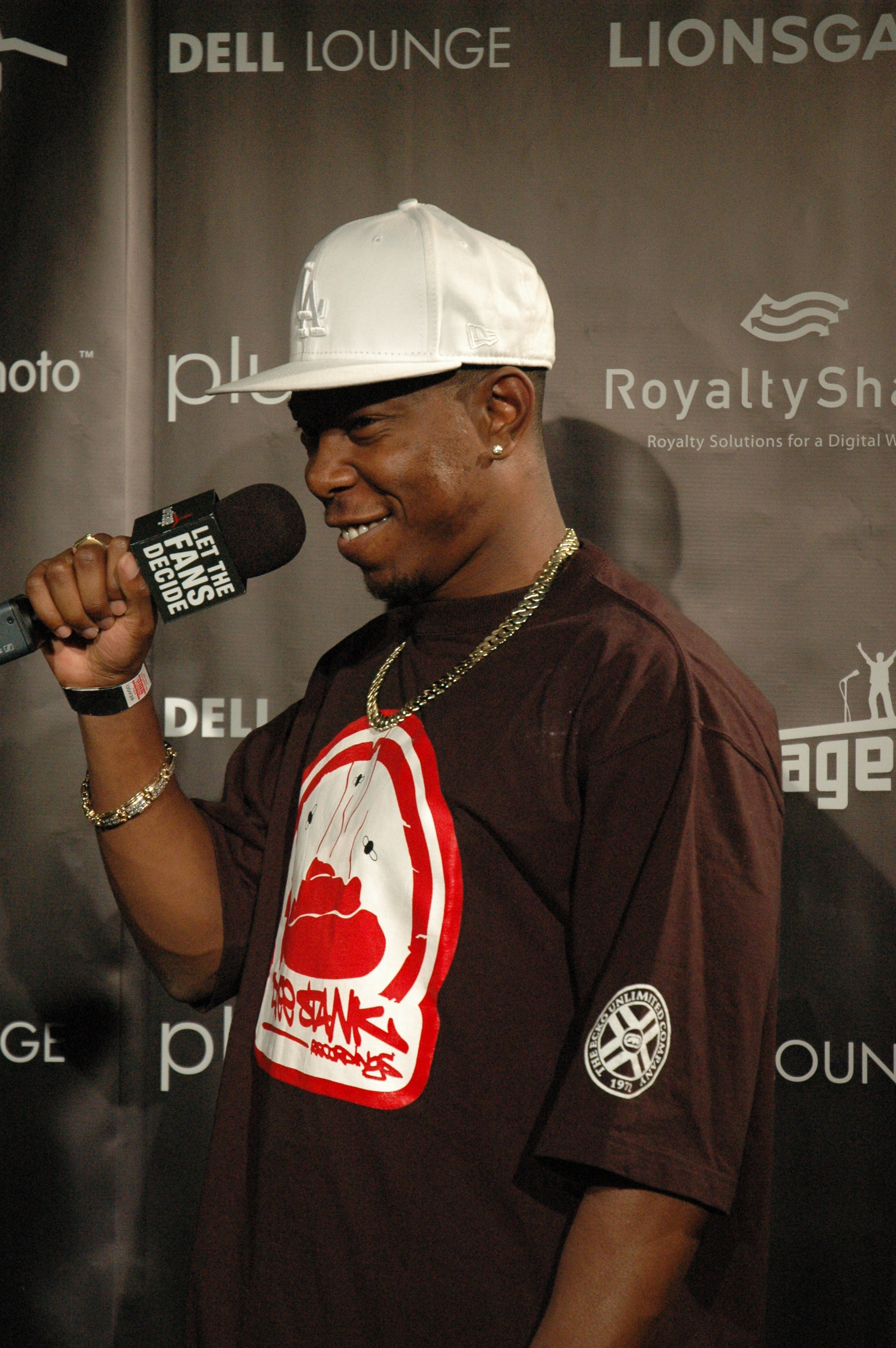
Rapper Dizzee Rascal topped the UK Independent Singles Chart with three different singles, which were number-one for a combined 13 weeks.

The UK Indie Chart is a weekly chart that ranks the biggest-selling singles that are released on independent record labels in the United Kingdom. It is compiled by the Official Charts Company and is based on both physical and digital single sales. In 2009, the chart was published in the UK magazines ChartsPlus and Music Week, on BBC Radio 1's website and, from October, on the Official Charts Company's website. During the year, 20 singles reached number one.

The chart was significantly revamped in June 2009. Since the inception of the UK Indie Chart in 1980, the definition of whether or not a single was "indie" had depended on the distribution channel by which it was shipped—the record needed to be delivered by a distribution service that was independent of the four major record companies: EMI, Sony Music Entertainment, Warner Music Group and Universal Music Group. The new system altered the qualification criteria to include only singles from labels that were at least fifty per cent owned by a record company that was not one of the main four. This prevented major record companies from qualifying for the chart by outsourcing the shipping of their singles to smaller distribution services. These new changes were first unveiled at the 2008 annual general meeting of the British Phonographic Industry on 9 July, and the new chart went live on 29 June 2009. The first song to top the chart under the new system was "Bonkers" by Dizzee Rascal.

"Bonkers" spent seven consecutive weeks at the top of the UK Indie Chart in 2009, making it the longest-running indie number one of the year; it was the longest-running number one since Dizzee's previous single, "Dance Wiv Me", which spent nine weeks at the top in 2008. "Bonkers" was also the biggest-selling indie hit of the year, selling more than 480,000 copies and topping the official UK Singles Chart. Other high-selling indie tracks included Dizzee's "Holiday", which sold almost 280,000 singles and topped the UK Singles Chart, and "Sweet Disposition" by The Temper Trap, which sold nearly 220,000 copies and made the UK Top Ten for two weeks. Dizzee was the only act to have more than one single reach number one—namely "Bonkers", "Holiday" and "Dirtee Cash"—and his songs were at the top for a total of 13 weeks.

Chart-topping singles from the 2009 UK Indie Chart also included a new adaptation of "The Fields of Anfield Road", which was released by Liverpool Collective to commemorate the twentieth anniversary of the Hillsborough disaster, and "The Haggis", a charity record released by students of Alva Academy in aid of Comic Relief. Swedish singer Victoria Bergsman topped the chart under the pseudonym Taken by Trees, after her cover version of "Sweet Child o' Mine" by Guns N' Roses was used in an advert for the UK department store John Lewis.

== Chart history ==
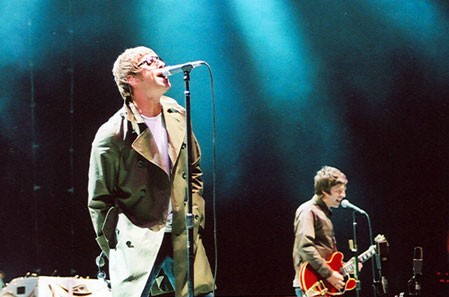
British band Oasis were the first act to top the UK Indie Chart in 2009, with their single "I'm Outta Time".

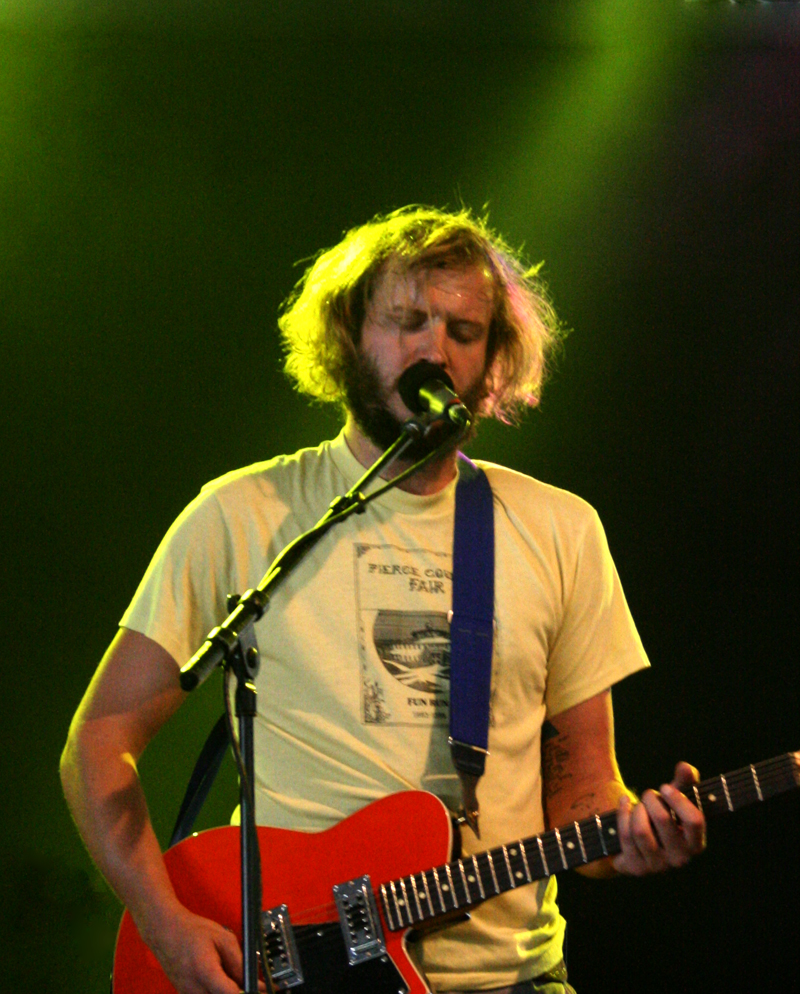
Bon Iver spent five weeks at number one with his EP Blood Bank.

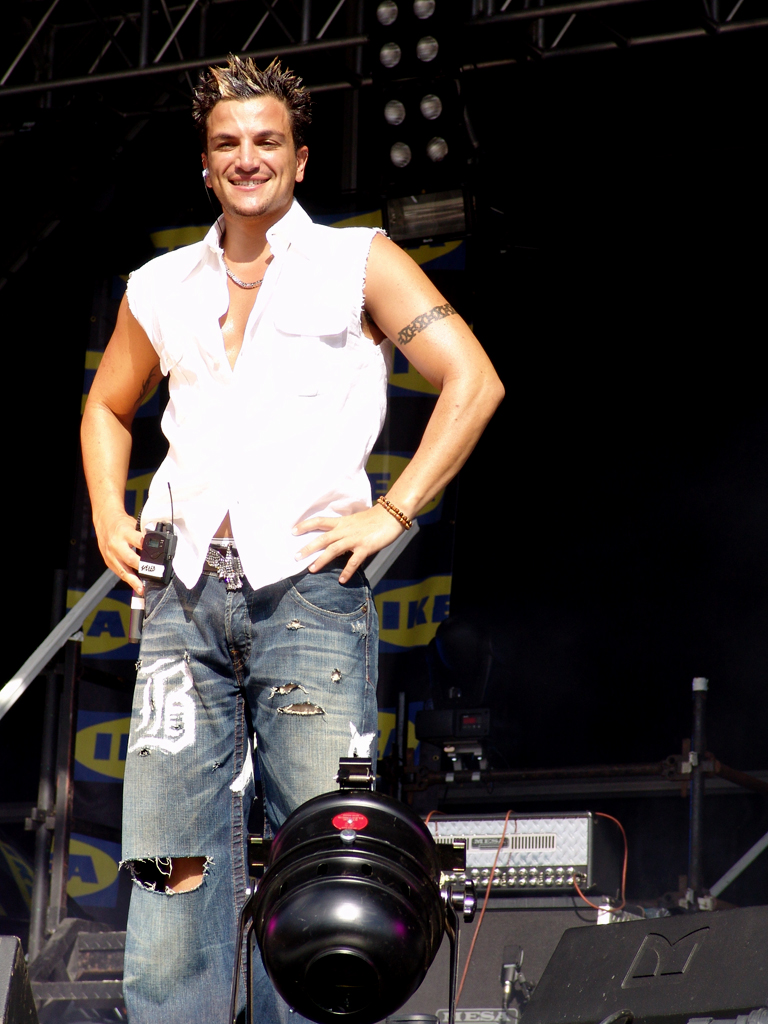
Australian singer Peter Andre reached number one with his single "Behind Closed Doors".

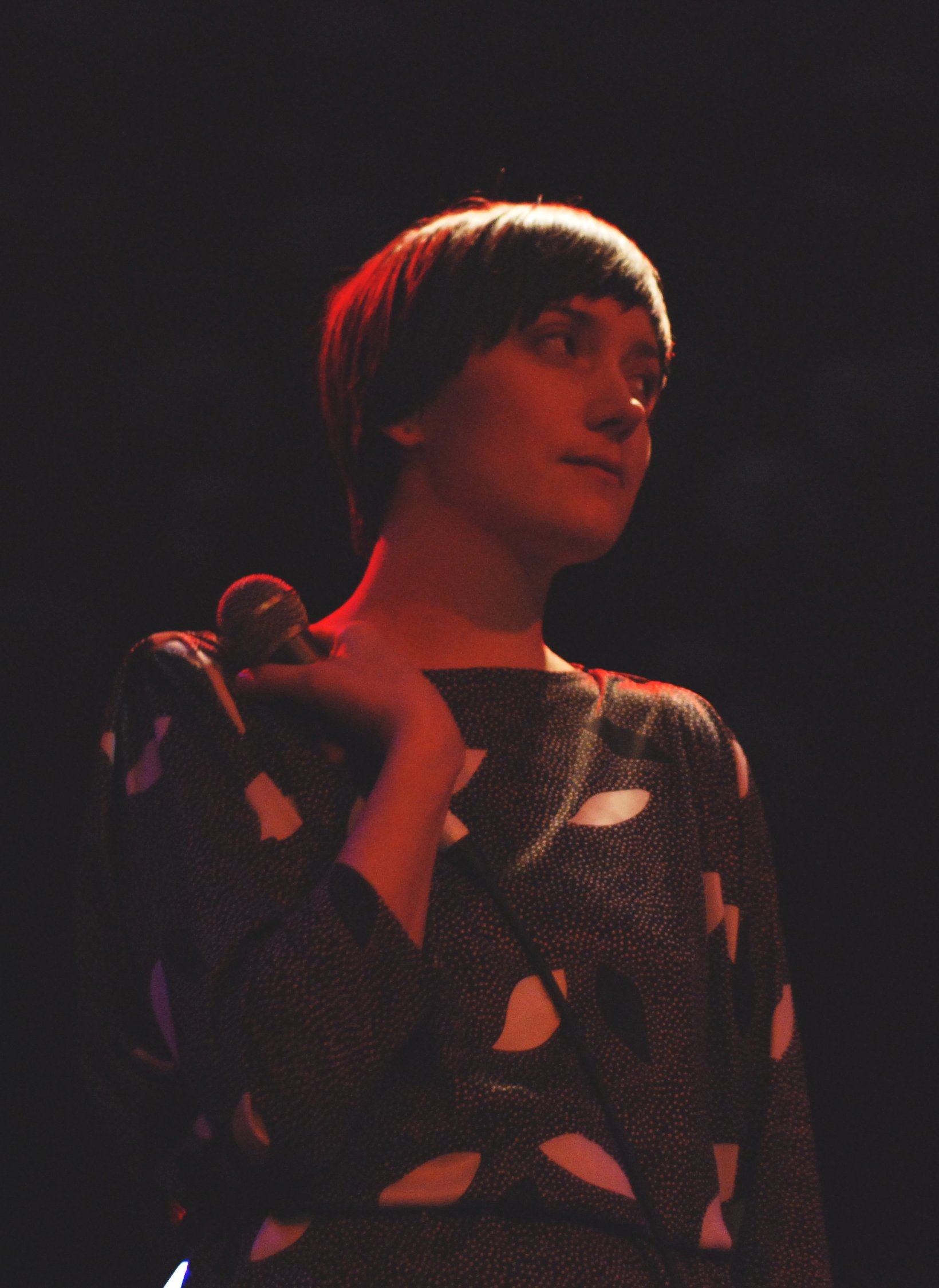
Victoria Bergsman topped the indie chart for two weeks under the pseudonym Taken by Trees with her version of "Sweet Child o' Mine".

Key
†	Best-selling indie single of the year

Issue date	Song	Artist(s)	Record label	Ref.
4 January	"I'm Outta Time"	Oasis	Big Brother	
11 January	"I'm Outta Time"	Oasis	Big Brother	
18 January	"I'm Outta Time"	Oasis	Big Brother	
25 January	Blood Bank	Bon Iver	Jagjaguwar	
1 February	Blood Bank	Bon Iver	Jagjaguwar	
8 February	Blood Bank	Bon Iver	Jagjaguwar	
15 February	Blood Bank	Bon Iver	Jagjaguwar	
22 February	Blood Bank	Bon Iver	Jagjaguwar	
1 March	"Against All Odds"	Chase & Status featuring Kano	Ram	
8 March	"Chip Diddy Chip"	Chipmunk	Alwayz	
15 March	"Falling Down"	Oasis	Big Brother	
22 March	"Falling Down"	Oasis	Big Brother	
29 March	"The Haggis"	Clax	Clax	
5 April	"Tonight's Today"	Jack Peñate	XL	
12 April	"The Fields of Anfield Road"	Liverpool Collective/KOP Choir	Robot	
19 April	"The Fields of Anfield Road"	Liverpool Collective/KOP Choir	Robot	
26 April	"The Fields of Anfield Road"	Liverpool Collective/KOP Choir	Robot	
3 May	"The Fields of Anfield Road"	Liverpool Collective/KOP Choir	Robot	
10 May	"The Kids Are Sick Again"	Maxïmo Park	Warp	
17 May	"Dust Devil"	Madness	Lucky 7	
24 May	"Bonkers" †	Dizzee Rascal & Armand Van Helden	Dirtee Stank	
31 May	"Bonkers" †	Dizzee Rascal & Armand Van Helden	Dirtee Stank	
7 June	"Bonkers" †	Dizzee Rascal & Armand Van Helden	Dirtee Stank	
14 June	"Bonkers" †	Dizzee Rascal & Armand Van Helden	Dirtee Stank	
21 June	"Bonkers" †	Dizzee Rascal & Armand Van Helden	Dirtee Stank	
28 June	"Bonkers" †	Dizzee Rascal & Armand Van Helden	Dirtee Stank	
5 July	"Bonkers" †	Dizzee Rascal & Armand Van Helden	Dirtee Stank	
12 July	"Crying Lightning"	Arctic Monkeys	Domino	
19 July	"Poppiholla"	Chicane	Modena	
26 July	"Poppiholla"	Chicane	Modena	
2 August	"Poppiholla"	Chicane	Modena	
9 August	"Poppiholla"	Chicane	Modena	
16 August	"Behind Closed Doors"	Peter Andre	Conehead	
23 August	"Behind Closed Doors"	Peter Andre	Conehead	
30 August	"Holiday"	Dizzee Rascal	Dirtee Stank	
6 September	"Holiday"	Dizzee Rascal	Dirtee Stank	
13 September	"Holiday"	Dizzee Rascal	Dirtee Stank	
20 September	"Holiday"	Dizzee Rascal	Dirtee Stank	
27 September	"Holiday"	Dizzee Rascal	Dirtee Stank	
4 October	"Sweet Disposition"	The Temper Trap	Infectious	
11 October	"Sweet Disposition"	The Temper Trap	Infectious	
18 October	"Sweet Disposition"	The Temper Trap	Infectious	
25 October	"Sweet Disposition"	The Temper Trap	Infectious	
1 November	"aNYway"	Duck Sauce	Data	
8 November	"aNYway"	Duck Sauce	Data	
15 November	"I've Got Nothing"	Chartjackers	Swinging Mantis	
22 November	"Dirtee Cash"	Dizzee Rascal	Dirtee Stank	
29 November	"Sweet Child o' Mine"	Taken by Trees	Rough Trade	
6 December	"Sweet Child o' Mine"	Taken by Trees	Rough Trade	
13 December	"(Let the Bass Kick) In Miami Girl"	Chuckie & LMFAO	CR2	
20 December	"(Let the Bass Kick) In Miami Girl"	Chuckie & LMFAO	CR2	
27 December	"(Let the Bass Kick) In Miami Girl"	Chuckie & LMFAO	CR2	

== See also ==
- List of number-one singles of 2009 (UK)
- List of UK Dance Chart number-one singles of 2009
- List of UK Indie Chart number-one albums of 2009
- List of UK Official Download Chart number-one singles of 2009
- List of UK Rock Chart number-one singles of 2009
- List of UK R&B Chart number-one singles of 2009
