= Revival (The Answer album) =

Studio album by The Answer
- Released: October 3, 2011
- Recorded: 2011
- Genre: Hard rock, blues rock
- Length: 50:00 (disc 1); 50:54 (disc 2)
- Label: Spinefarm Records
- Producer: Chris "Frenchie" Smith, The Answer

The Answer chronology
Everyday Demons (2009)	Revival (2011)	New Horizon (2013)

Singles from Revival
- 1. "Vida (I Want You)" Released: 5 September 2011; 2. "Nowhere Freeway" Released: 20 February 2012

Professional ratings
Review scores
Source	Rating
AllMusic	2.5/5 stars
Classic Rock	7/10 stars
rushonrock.com	8/10 stars

"Revival" is the third studio album from the Northern Ireland-based hard rock band The Answer and was released on October 3, 2011 via Spinefarm Records. The initial run of the album is a limited-edition deluxe format with 24-page booklet and band sleeve notes, including an 11-track second disc containing previously unreleased studio, acoustic, demo and cover material.

"Revival" was produced by Chris "Frenchie" Smith and mixed by Chris Sheldon.

== Track listing ==
Revival
No.	Title	Length
1.	"Waste Your Tears"	3:58
2.	"Use Me"	3:36
3.	"Trouble"	3:09
4.	"Nowhere Freeway" (feat. Lynne Jackaman)	3:38
5.	"Tornado"	3:45
6.	"Vida (I Want You)"	4:14
7.	"Caught on the Riverbed"	4:41
8.	"Destroy Me"	4:26
9.	"New Day Rising"	4:40
10.	"Can't Remember, Can't Forget"	3:16
11.	"One More Revival"	6:32
12.	"Lights Are Down"	4:05

After the Revival
No.	Title	Length
1.	"Piece by Piece"	3:45
2.	"Faith Gone Down"	5:49
3.	"Nowhere Freeway" (live acoustic)	4:30
4.	"Tailspin" (Renegade demo)	3:30
5.	"Fire and Water" (Free cover)	3:52
6.	"What I Am" (demo)	4:25
7.	"Caught on the Riverbed" (alt. steel version)	5:20
8.	"The Enemy" (Point demo)	6:16
9.	"Show Me the World" (Point demo)	4:30
10.	"One More Revival" (live acoustic)	4:55
11.	"Lights Are Down" (vocals & piano)	3:53

== Personnel ==
- Cormac Neeson - vocals, harmonica, piano, mellotron
- Paul Mahon - guitar, backing vocals
- Micky Waters - bass, backing vocals
- James Heatley - drums, percussion, backing vocals

=== Additional personnel ===
- Paully "Deathwish" Etheredge - Hammond M1 on "Waste Your Tears" and "Vida (I Want You)", keyboards on "Tornado", "Caught on the Riverbed" and "One More Revival", piano on "Lights Are Down" and "Lights Are Down" (vocals & piano version)
- Chris "Frenchie" Smith - additional percussion on "Trouble", "Vida (I Want You)" and "One More Revival", backing vocals on "Trouble" and "Tailspin", mellotron effects on "Destroy Me"
- Lynne Jackaman (from Saint Jude) - vocals on "Nowhere Freeway"
- Zee Asha & Maria Q - additional vocals on "One More Revival"
- Julia Magness & Tracy Todd - backing vocals on "One More Revival"
- Jamie Muhoberac - keyboards on "Faith Gone Down"
- Alex Brown - backing vocals on "Faith Gone Down"

=== Production ===
- Chris "Frenchie" Smith - production on all tracks from disc 1, and "Piece by Piece", "Faith Gone Down", "Tailspin", "Fire and Water" and "Lights Are Down" (vocals & piano version), mixing on "Tailspin"
- The Answer - production on "Nowhere Freeway" (live acoustic), "Tailspin", "Caught on the Riverbed" (alt. steel version), "The Enemy", "Show Me the World" and "One More Revival" (live acoustic)
- Jason Buntz - engineering on all tracks from disc 1, and "Piece by Piece", "Faith Gone Down", "Fire and Water"
- Chris Sheldon - mixing on all tracks from disc 1, and "Piece by Piece", "Faith Gone Down", "Fire and Water" and "Lights Are Down" (vocals & piano version)
- Paul Mahon - mixing on "Nowhere Freeway" (live acoustic), "Caught on the Riverbed" (alt. steel version), "The Enemy", "Show Me the World" and "One More Revival" (live acoustic)
- All tracks mastered by Shawn Joseph at Optimum Mastering
