= Keep Believin' =

Single by The Answer
- Released: July 18, 2005
- Genre: Hard rock
- Length: 3:54
- Label: Albert Records
- Songwriters: Cormac Neeson, Paul Mahon, Micky Waters, James Heatley

The Answer singles chronology
"Rise" (2004)	"Keep Believin'" (2005)	"Never Too Late" (2005)

Keep Believin' is a single released in 2005 by the Answer. Although it did not feature on their 2006 debut album Rise, it was featured on the bonus disc of the special edition version of the same album, released in 2007.

== Track listing ==
=== CD ===
1. Keep Believin'
2. So Cold
3. No Questions Asked
4. Be What You Want
5. Keep Believin' (club mix)

=== Vinyl ===
1. Keep Believin'
2. New Day Rising

== Personnel ==
- Cormac Neeson - Lead vocals
- Paul Mahon - Guitar
- Micky Waters - Bass
- James Heatley - Drums

== Charts ==
Chart (2005)	Peak position
UK Indie (OCC)	30
UK Rock & Metal (OCC)	12
