= The Answer (band) =

Northern Irish hard rock band

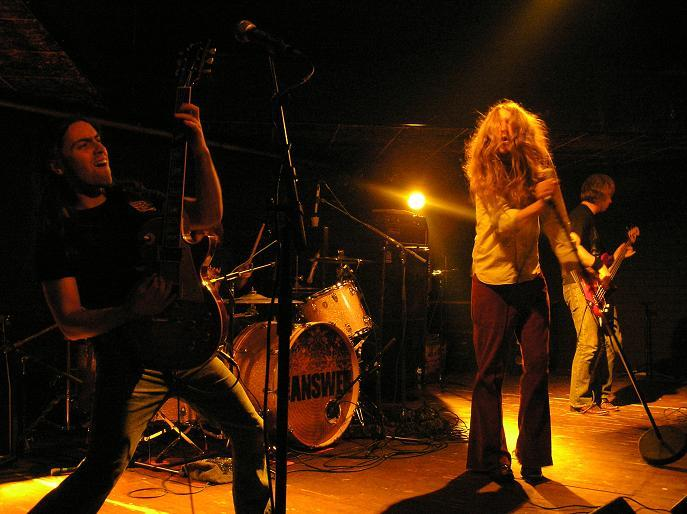
- The Answer in 2006.

Background information
- Origin: Downpatrick and Newcastle, County Down, Northern Ireland
- Genre: Hard rock
- Years active: 2000–present
- Label: Albert Productions (UK)
- Members: Cormac Neeson; Paul Mahon; Micky Waters; James Heatley

The Answer are a hard rock band from Newcastle and Downpatrick, County Down, Northern Ireland, UK. They have achieved success with their debut album Rise selling in excess of 30,000 copies in the UK and Europe, 10,000 on day one in Japan and 100,000 worldwide.

== History ==
=== Formation ===
The Answer were formed in 2000 by guitarist Paul Mahon, whose father was a jazz trumpeter and member of seminal Irish showband The Freshmen, who released three albums on CBS and toured with the likes of the Beach Boys. Aged 18, Paul knew he wanted to put together a rock band and mentioned it to bassist Micky Waters, an old school friend who had been in numerous cover bands around Belfast.

James Heatley, who had played as Ash's stand-in live drummer in 1993, was recruited to be the drummer for The Answer. Paul called him up only to find that he was about to take his finals at University, so the trio waited whilst James completed his degree in Psychology.

In late June 2000, the four of them got together for their debut rehearsal. 2001 was spent writing, rehearsing, gigging locally and building up a set The Answer. By 2002, the band had attracted the attention of MCD promotions in Ireland, (the company who recently bought out the Mean Fiddler Group, alongside Clear Channel), who put them on as openers at the Witnness Festival that year.

Eamonn Keyes, owner of Doghouse Studios recorded them before they were signed.

=== Early recognition ===
In 2005, Classic Rock magazine voted The Answer as Best New Band 2005, which brought them even more exposure. The Answer then went on to co-headline the first Nokia 'New School of Rock' Tour, with Tokyo Dragons and The Sound Explosion. Shortly afterwards, in November 2005, came their second official release – the single "Never Too Late". They supported Deep Purple at an intimate show at the London Astoria on 17 January 2006.

=== Rise (2005–2008) ===
Afterwards came "Into the Gutter" which was released on 29 May 2006 via 7" vinyl and download only, shortly followed by debut album Rise released on 26 June 2006. The album received acclaim from Kerrang! and The Sun amongst others, and was nominated for Classic Rock magazine's 'Album of the Year' and Best British Newcomer at the 2006 Kerrang! awards.

The Answer played several festivals over the summer months, as well as a support slot with Whitesnake throughout their UK tour. The band also managed to secure themselves another support slot with Paul Rodgers at the Royal Albert Hall in early October 2006. This was followed by a co-headlining tour with fellow Rockers Roadstar on a tour across the UK and Europe, with further support coming from American blues-rock band Rose Hill Drive. The band was once again touring, with dates in Australia and across Europe before eventually returning for dates in Ireland and to start work on their follow-up to Rise. The band were an opening act for Aerosmith on 24 June 2007 at Hyde Park Calling.

The single "Be What You Want" was released on 19 March 2007, and is currently available via download-only.

The Answer decided to re-issue the Rise album as a promotion for their summer shows and because there had been so many people complaining about download only singles. A second disc adds to the original Rise, featuring all the relevant b-sides that had not been released physically and some tracks that were recorded for the album but left off. The second disc has 15 unreleased songs on it and was released 18 June 2007. They also covered the Aerosmith song "Sweet Emotion" for a free Kerrang! CD. This was included on the second disc of the Special Edition of the Rise album.

The summer of 2007 also saw the band support The Rolling Stones at huge open-air gigs in Belgrade (Serbia), and Düsseldorf (Germany), and The Who in Dublin (Ireland).

They played a live set at the Planet Rock Radio Christmas Party, on 11 December 2007 at the Islington Academy, London, during which they were joined on stage by Paul Rodgers (vocalist for Free and Bad Company). Recordings of this concert were released as Live at Planet Rock Xmas Party. The band played at a Phil Lynott memorial benefit gig in Dublin, when bass player Micky Waters played Phil Lynott's black bass, becoming the first person to do so since Lynott's death. The same instrument is used by Waters in the music video for "Keep Believin'". Def Leppard's lead singer Joe Elliott is a fan of the band and during an interview with AOL has cited them as a possible influence to the way their forthcoming album will sound. Former Led Zeppelin guitarist Jimmy Page is also a fan and has attended several of the band's gigs and stated so at the 2005 Classic Rock magazine Roll of Honour Awards.

=== Never Too Late ===
The band finally began to establish some inroads with American audiences when they signed with the indie label The End Records for U.S. distribution. As part of the agreement, the Answer released an EP in 2008 called Never Too Late, which contained a track from Rise as well as a song, "Highwater or Hell", that would appear on their forthcoming full-length album Everyday Demons. Also aiding their visibility, the group were named as the opening act for the North American leg as well as the European leg of AC/DC's Black Ice World Tour which began 28 October 2008.

=== Everyday Demons ===
In June 2008, they played a short set at the Isle of Wight Festival. A few days later they went to L.A. to record their second album with John Travis. Everyday Demons is now commercially available worldwide. Sharing mixing duties are Tim Palmer and Mike Fraser.

=== Tour with AC/DC ===
The Answer opened for AC/DC on the 2008 and 2009 legs of the Black Ice World Tour, arguably acting as the most worldwide exposure that the band has received to date.

=== Late 2009–2016 ===
The band played some small headline shows in between their dates with AC/DC in North America in August 2009. This was followed by a 15-date tour of the UK during November/December 2009 and a 3-show Spanish tour in March 2010. On 3 October, the band released its third studio album Revival, and a DVD, titled 412 Days of Rock 'n' Roll, containing performances from opening AC/DC's Black Ice World Tour. The DVD also came with a bonus CD of live recordings and two new studio recordings. The Answer were to be undertaking a co-headline tour of the UK and Europe through late autumn and winter of 2016 with The Dead Daisies.

=== 2017–present ===
The Answer conducted a UK tour based around the new single "In This Land". The tour's set list was dominated by the new album Solas (2016) but featuring some of the band's most well-known pieces such as "Waste Your Tears", "Demon Eyes" and guitarist Paul Mahon's favourite "Come Follow Me". The nine day tour featured venues such as Limelight Belfast, Manchester Band on the wall and Southampton Rescue Rooms. The band was followed by a solo documentary maker called Philip Thompson. Thompson followed the band's tour and filmed an exclusive behind the scenes film that gives fans an in depth look into what the band get up to when not on stage. The film features the band's music throughout and also highlights the areas of what life is like for a touring rock band. The film was set for release in May 2017.

== Songs in other media ==
The song "Never Too Late" is featured in the Guitar Hero World Tour video game.

The song "Into the Gutter" is featured in the soundtrack to the video game "Pure"

The song "Piece By Piece" is featured in the video game Dirt: Showdown.

== Discography ==
=== Studio albums ===
Title	Album details	Peak chart positions				
Title	Album details	IRL	UK	FRA	GER	JPN
Rise	Released: 26 June 2006; Label: Albert; Formats: CD, download	—	88	—	—	27
Everyday Demons	Released: 2 March 2009; Label: Albert, The End (US); Formats: CD, download, LP	67	25	117	83	30
Revival	Released: 3 October 2011; Label: Spinefarm; Formats: CD, download	86	39	—	68	101
New Horizon	Released: 27 September 2013; Label: Napalm; Formats: CD, download, LP	—	45	—	65	152
Raise a Little Hell	Released: 9 March 2015; Label: Napalm; Formats: CD, download, LP	—	44	—	48	—
Solas	Released: 14 October 2016; Label: Napalm; Formats: CD, download, LP	—	51	—	90	—
Sundowners	Released: 17 March 2023; Label: Golden Robot; Formats: CD, download, LP	—	46	—	32	—
"—" denotes releases that did not chart or were not released in that territory.

=== Other albums ===
Title	Album details	Peak chart positions
Title	Album details	UK
Live at Planet Rock Xmas Party	Released: 6 October 2008; Formats: CD	—
412 Days of Rock 'n' Roll	Released: 13 June 2011; Formats: CD/DVD	166
"—" denotes releases that did not chart or were not released in that territory.

=== Singles and EPs ===
Year	SP/EP	Release date	Formats and track listing	Notes	Album
2002	"Breakdown Honey"	Second quarter, 2002	CD: L.I.V.I.N. • Wake Up! • Downtown	Self-released	n/a
2003	"End Your Day on a High" SP	January 2003	CD: Always • Tonight • Song for the People	Self-released	n/a
2003	"Come On, Free Me"	January 2003	CD: Keep Believin' • No Questions Asked • New Day Rising • Be What You Want	Self-released	n/a
2004	"Rise" SP	March 2004	Rise • Rise (acoustic version)	Self-released	n/a
2005	"Keep Believin'"	18 July 2005	CD: Keep Believin' • No Questions Asked • Be What You Want • So Cold • Keep Believin' (Club Mix); 7": Keep Believin' • New Day Rising	UK Singles Chart #206	n/a
2005	"Never Too Late"	14 November 2005	CD: Never Too Late • Rock Bottom Blues • Never Too Late (Instrumental) • Keep Believin (Club Mix); 7": Never Too Late • Some Unity	UK Singles Chart #95	Rise
2006	"Into the Gutter" SP	29 May 2006	7": Into the Gutter • Take It Easy Download: Into the Gutter • Take It Easy • Only the Strong Survive • Into the Gutter (Instrumental)		Rise
2006	"Under the Sky"	1 October 2006	Download: Under the Sky • Doctor (Live) • I Won't Let You Down		Rise
2006	"Come Follow Me" SP	18 December 2006	Download: Come Follow Me • Preachin' (Acoustic) • So Cold (Live)		Rise
2007	"Be What You Want" SP	19 March 2007	Download: Be What You Want • Sweet Emotion • Into the Gutter (Acoustic) • No Questions Asked (Live Radio Session)		Rise
2008	Never Too Late EP	11 November 2008	CD: Never Too Late • Highwater or Hell • The Doctor • Come Follow Me (Live in Japan)	With bonus DVD; first North American release.	Rise
2009	"On and On" SP	22 February 2009	Download: On and On • Pride (Acoustic) • Demon Eyes (Live)		Everyday Demons
2009	"Tonight" SP	March 2009; 21 June 2009	Radio promo CD: Tonight • Demon Eyes; Download: Tonight • Tonight (Acoustic) • Dead of the Night (Live)		Everyday Demons
2009	"Comfort Zone" SP	29 November 2009	Download: Comfort Zone (Radio Edit) • Here to Stay • Comfort Zone (Acoustic)		Everyday Demons
2011	"Rock 'n' Roll Outlaw"	16 April 2011	7": Rock 'n' Roll Outlaw • Fooled Me (Demo)	Record Store Day	412 Days of Rock 'n' Roll
2011	"Vida (I Want You)" SP	5 September 2011	Download: Vida (I Want You) • Can't Remember, Can't Forget (Acoustic)		Revival
2012	"Nowhere Freeway"	20 February 2012	Download: Nowhere Freeway • Battlecry • Nowhere Freeway (Acoustic)	Featuring Lynne Jackaman from Saint Jude	Revival
2012	"Rise" SP	2 July 2012	Download: Rise (Radio Edit) • Lost • Rise (Acoustic) • Rise (Full Version)		n/a
2013	"Spectacular" SP	5 August 2013	Download: Spectacular • Speak Now (Acoustic)		New Horizon
2014	"New Horizon" SP	11 March 2014	Download: New Horizon (Radio Mix) • Cradle Rock • Snakes of Christ • Road Less Travelled (Acoustic Version) • Road Less Travelled (Acoustic Version – No Drums)		New Horizon
2015	"Gone Too Long (Radio Edit)"	2015	Download: Gone Too Long (Radio Edit) • Gone Too Long (Acoustic) • Gone Too Long (instrumental)		Raise a Little Hell
2016	"Under the Sky (2016 mix)" SP	21 April 2016	Download: Under The Sky 2016 single re-mixed & re-mastered		Rise (10th Anniversary Edition)
2016	"Beautiful World" SP	25 August 2016	Download: Beautiful World		Solas
2022	"Blood Brother" SP	14 October 2022	Download: Blood Brother		n/a
2023	"Want You to Love Me" SP	13 January 2023	Download: Want You To Love Me		n/a
2023	"Livin' on the Line" SP	27 January 2023	Download: Livin' on the Line		n/a
