= New Horizon (The Answer album) =

2013 studio album by the Answer

Studio album by The Answer
- Released: 30 September 2013
- Recorded: 2012–2013 at Vale Studios, Evesham
- Genre: Hard rock, blues rock
- Length: 37:44
- Label: Napalm Records
- Producer: Toby Jepson

The Answer chronology
Revival (2011)	New Horizon (2013)	Raise a Little Hell (2015)

Singles from New Horizon
- 1. "Spectacular" Released: 5 August 2013

New Horizon is the fourth studio album by Northern Irish rock band The Answer. The album, which was released on 30 September 2013, was produced by Little Angels frontman Toby Jepson and features artwork from the legendary designer Storm Thorgerson, who was working on the cover shortly before his death in April 2013. New Horizon is the band's first album with Napalm Records, with whom they signed the previous year.

"Spectacular" is the first single taken from the album. It was released on 5 August 2013, on two formats: download, and a limited edition green and blue 7" vinyl.

== Track listing ==
All tracks written by James Heatley, Paul Mahon, Cormac Neeson and Micky Waters, except where noted.

No.	Title	Writer(s)	Length
1.	"New Horizon"		3:48
2.	"Leave with Nothin'"		3:51
3.	"Spectacular"	Heatley, Mahon, Neeson, Waters, Toby Jepson	3:52
4.	"Speak Now"	Heatley, Mahon, Neeson, Waters, Jepson	3:38
5.	"Somebody Else"	Heatley, Mahon, Neeson, Waters, Jepson	3:46
6.	"Concrete"	Heatley, Mahon, Neeson, Waters, Jepson	3:45
7.	"Call Yourself a Friend"		4:55
8.	"Baby Kill Me"	Heatley, Mahon, Neeson, Waters, Cosmo Jarvis	3:03
9.	"Burn You Down"	Heatley, Mahon, Neeson, Waters, Jepson	3:30
10.	"Scream a Louder Love"		3:36
Total length:			37:44

Limited edition bonus tracks
No.	Title	Length
11.	"Road Less Travelled"	4:44
12.	"Feel the Fear"	3:30
13.	"Real As It Gets"	3:27
Total length:		49:25

Double vinyl bonus tracks
No.	Title	Length
14.	"White Flag"	3:29
15.	"To Be True"	3:31
16.	"City Won't Fall"	7:32
Total length:		1:03:57

Source: Amazon.co.uk

== Personnel ==
The Answer

- Cormac Neeson — lead vocals
- Paul Mahon — guitars
- Micky Waters — bass
- James Heatley — drums

Production

- Toby Jepson — production
- Ewan Davies — engineering
- Mike Fraser — mixing
- The Answer — production
- Guillermo "Will" Maya — mixing
- Shawn Joseph — mastering

Other

- Storm Thorgerson/Stormstudios — artwork design and photography
- Carrie Davenport — additional photography
