= List of UK R&B Albums Chart number ones of 2009 =

The logo of the Official Charts Company, responsible for compiling all of the official music charts in the United Kingdom, including the R&B albums chart.

The UK R&B Chart is a weekly chart, first introduced in October 1994, that ranks the 40 biggest-selling singles and albums that are classified in the R&B genre in the United Kingdom. The chart is compiled by the Official Charts Company, and is based on sales of CDs, downloads, vinyl and other formats over the previous seven days.

The following are the number-one albums of 2009.

== Number-one albums ==
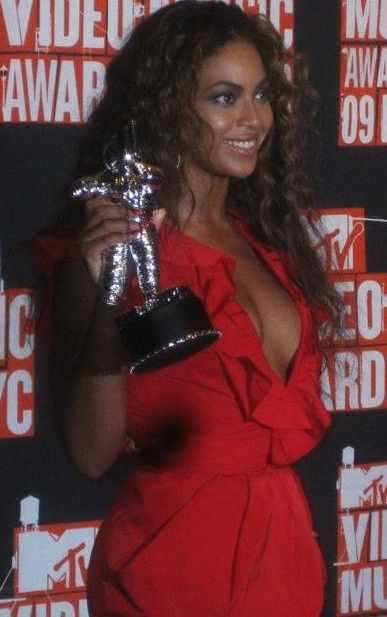
Beyoncé's album I Am... Sasha Fierce spent a total of 13 weeks at the top of the UK R&B Albums Chart throughout 2009. To date the album has been certified 6× Platinum in the United Kingdom.

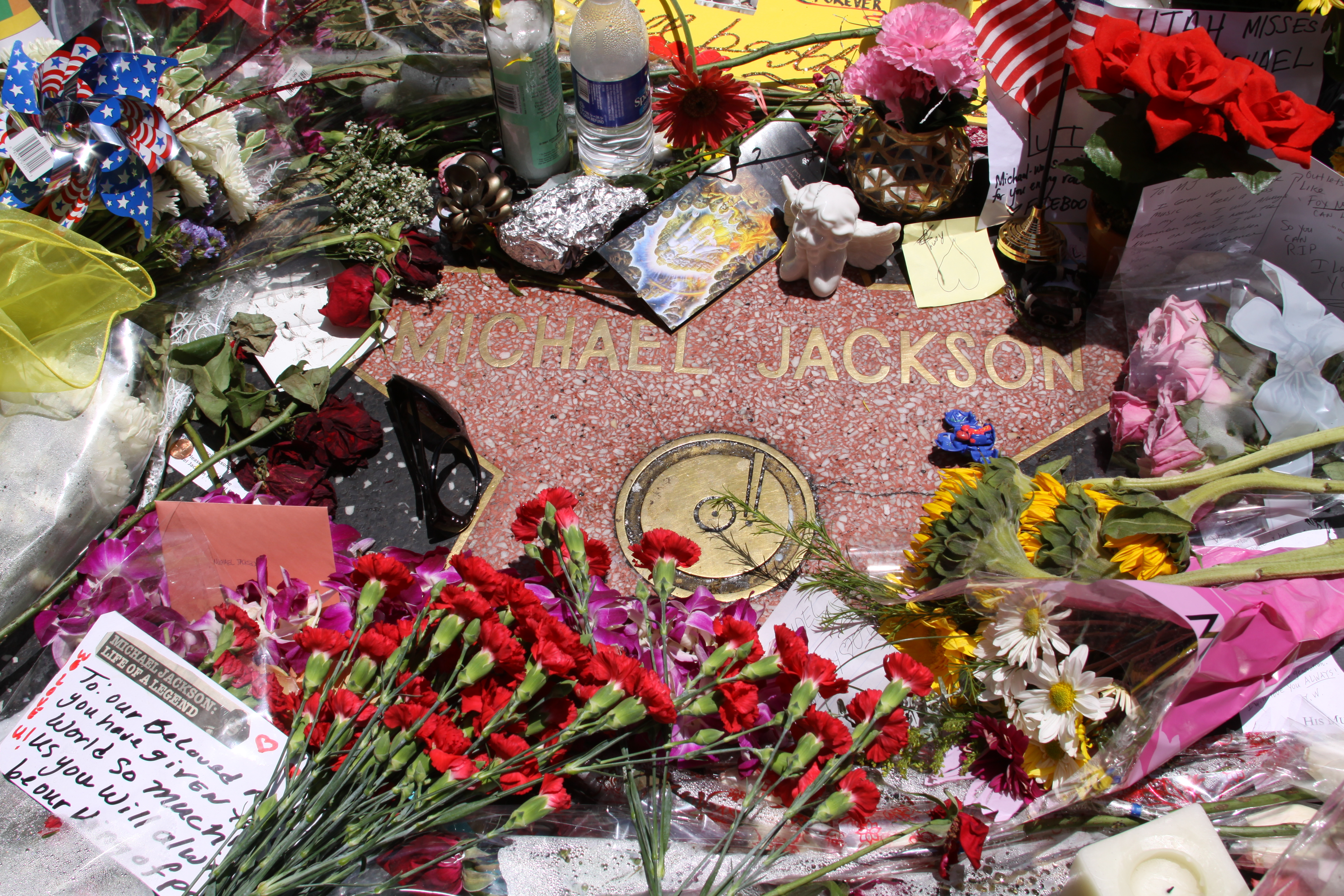
Following his death earlier in the year, Michael Jackson's posthumous release, This Is It, reached number one in November and went on to be certified platinum by the BPI after just one month of release, denoting sales of 300,000 copies.

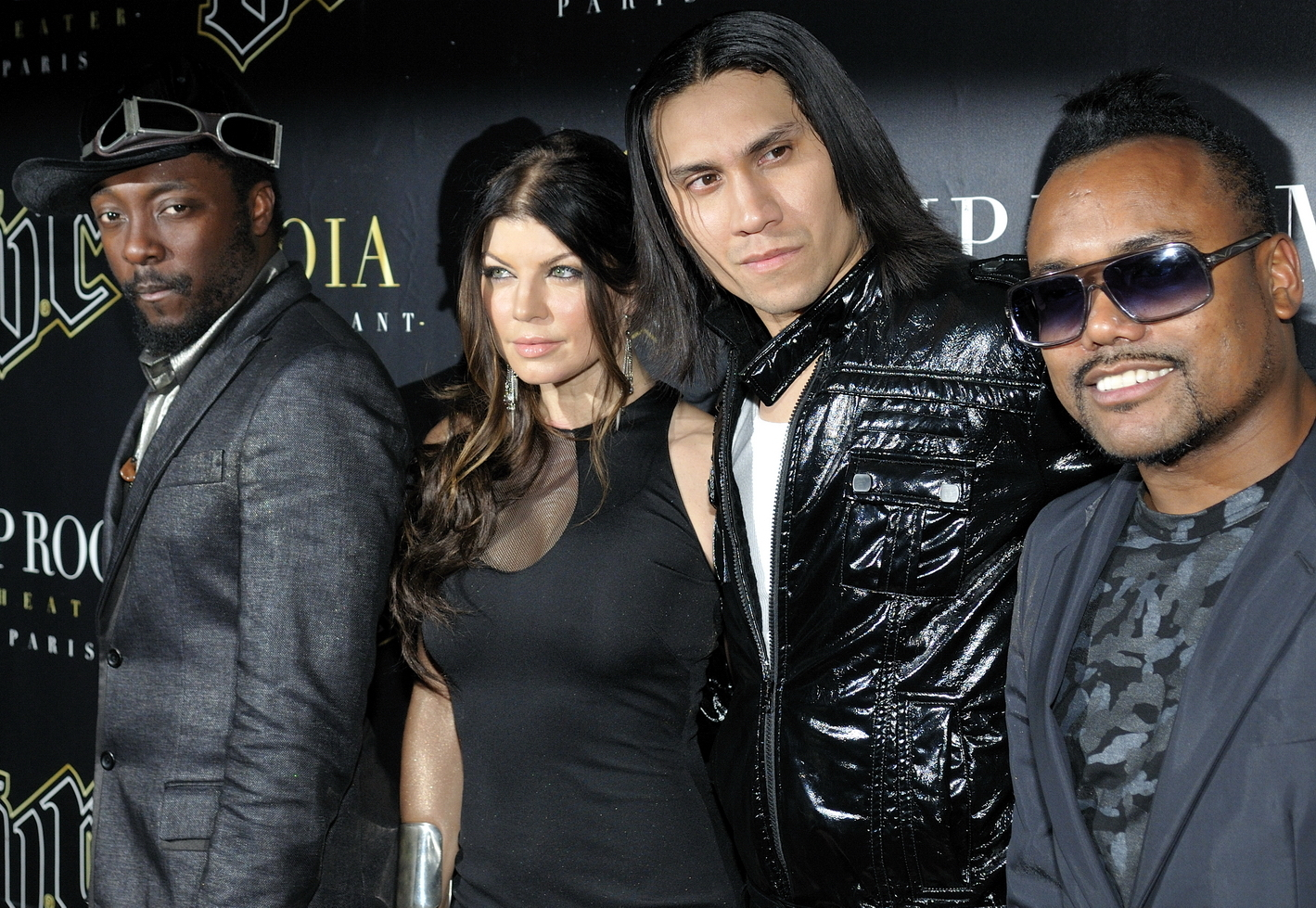
The E.N.D by The Black Eyed Peas spent 8 weeks at the top of the UK R&B Albums chart in 2009.

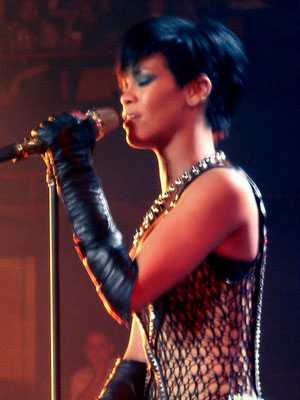
Rihanna's album Good Girl Gone Bad spent its 11th week at the top of the UK R&B Albums chart in 2009, over a year and a half after it first topped the chart in June 2007.

Issue date	Album	Artist	Record label	Ref.
4 January	Spirit	Leona Lewis	Syco/Sony BMG/J	
11 January	I Am... Sasha Fierce	Beyoncé	Music World/Columbia	
18 January	I Am... Sasha Fierce	Beyoncé	Music World/Columbia	
25 January	Good Girl Gone Bad	Rihanna	Def Jam/SRP	
1 February	I Am... Sasha Fierce	Beyoncé	Music World/Columbia	
8 February	I Am... Sasha Fierce	Beyoncé	Music World/Columbia	
15 February	Lovesongs	Luther Vandross	Sony Music	
22 February	I Am... Sasha Fierce	Beyoncé	Music World/Columbia	
1 March	I Am... Sasha Fierce	Beyoncé	Music World/Columbia	
8 March	I Am... Sasha Fierce	Beyoncé	Music World/Columbia	
15 March	Freedom	Akon	Universal	
22 March	Just Go	Lionel Richie	Mercury	
29 March	Freedom	Akon	Universal	
5 April ^{[b]}	R.O.O.T.S.	Flo Rida	Atlantic	
12 April	I Am... Sasha Fierce	Beyoncé	Music World/Columbia	
19 April	I Am... Sasha Fierce	Beyoncé	Music World/Columbia	
26 April	I Am... Sasha Fierce	Beyoncé	Music World/Columbia	
3 May	I Am... Sasha Fierce	Beyoncé	Music World/Columbia	
10 May	I Am... Sasha Fierce	Beyoncé	Music World/Columbia	
17 May	R&B Collection - Summer 2009	Various Artists	UMTV	
24 May ^{[a]}	Relapse	Eminem	Interscope	
31 May ^{[a]}	Relapse	Eminem	Interscope	
7 June	Relapse	Eminem	Interscope	
14 June ^{[b]}	The E.N.D	The Black Eyed Peas	Interscope	
21 June ^{[b]}	The E.N.D	The Black Eyed Peas	Interscope	
28 June	The Essential Michael Jackson	Michael Jackson	Epic	
5 July ^{[a]} ^{[b]}	The Essential Michael Jackson	Michael Jackson	Epic	
12 July ^{[a]} ^{[b]}	The Essential Michael Jackson	Michael Jackson	Epic	
19 July ^{[a]}	The Essential Michael Jackson	Michael Jackson	Epic	
26 July ^{[a]}	The Essential Michael Jackson	Michael Jackson	Epic	
2 August ^{[a]}	The Essential Michael Jackson	Michael Jackson	Epic	
9 August ^{[a]}	The Essential Michael Jackson	Michael Jackson	Epic	
16 August ^{[b]}	The E.N.D	The Black Eyed Peas	Interscope	
23 August	I Am... Sasha Fierce	Beyoncé	Music World/Columbia	
30 August ^{[b]}	The E.N.D	The Black Eyed Peas	Interscope	
6 September	The E.N.D	The Black Eyed Peas	Interscope	
13 September	The E.N.D	The Black Eyed Peas	Interscope	
20 September	The Blueprint 3	Jay-Z	Roc Nation/Atlantic	
27 September	Tongue N' Cheek	Dizzee Rascal	Dirtee Stank/Liberation	
3 October	Tongue N' Cheek	Dizzee Rascal	Dirtee Stank/Liberation	
10 October	Tongue N' Cheek	Dizzee Rascal	Dirtee Stank/Liberation	
17 October	The Blueprint 3	Jay-Z	Roc Nation/Atlantic	
24 October ^{[b]}	I Am Chipmunk	Chipmunk	Columbia	
31 October	I Look to You	Whitney Houston	Arista	
7 November	This Is It	Michael Jackson	Epic	
14 November	This Is It	Michael Jackson	Epic	
21 November ^{[a]}	JLS	JLS	Epic	
28 November ^{[a]}	Echo	Leona Lewis	Syco/J	
5 December	JLS	JLS	Epic	
12 December	JLS	JLS	Epic	
19 December	The E.N.D	The Black Eyed Peas	Interscope	
26 December ^{[b]}	The E.N.D	The Black Eyed Peas	Interscope	

== Notes ==
- ^{a} - The album was simultaneously number-one on the UK albums chart.
- ^{b} - The artist was simultaneously number-one on the R&B singles chart.

== See also ==
- List of UK Albums Chart number ones of 2009
- List of UK R&B Chart number-one singles of 2009
