= List of UK Dance Singles Chart number ones of 2009 =

These are The Official UK Charts Company UK Dance Chart number one hits of 2009. The dates listed in the menus below represent the Saturday after the Sunday the chart was announced, as per the way the dates are given in chart publications such as the ones produced by Billboard, Guinness, and Virgin.

== Number ones ==
Key
†	Best-selling dance single of the year

Week Ending	Song title	Artist
3 January	"Pjanoo"	Eric Prydz
10 January	"Pjanoo"	Eric Prydz
17 January	"Infinity 2008"	Guru Josh Project
24 January	"Day 'n' Nite"	Kid Cudi vs. Crookers
31 January	"Day 'n' Nite"	Kid Cudi vs. Crookers
7 February	"Day 'n' Nite"	Kid Cudi vs. Crookers
14 February	"Day 'n' Nite"	Kid Cudi vs. Crookers
21 February	"Day 'n' Nite"	Kid Cudi vs. Crookers
28 February	"Omen"	The Prodigy
7 March	"Omen"	The Prodigy
14 March	"Omen"	The Prodigy
21 March	"Omen"	The Prodigy
28 March	"Day 'n' Nite"	Kid Cudi vs. Crookers
4 April	"Show Me Love"	Steve Angello & Laidback Luke featuring Robin S
11 April	"Show Me Love"	Steve Angello & Laidback Luke featuring Robin S
18 April	"Show Me Love"	Steve Angello & Laidback Luke featuring Robin S
25 April	"Show Me Love"	Steve Angello & Laidback Luke featuring Robin S
2 May	"Basement Track"	High Contrast
9 May	"Day 'n' Nite"	Kid Cudi vs. Crookers
16 May	"Show Me Love"	Steve Angello & Laidback Luke featuring Robin S
23 May	"Warrior's Dance"	The Prodigy
30 May	"Bonkers" †	Dizzee Rascal & Armand van Helden
6 June	"Bonkers" †	Dizzee Rascal & Armand van Helden
13 June	"Warrior's Dance"	The Prodigy
20 June	"Warrior's Dance"	The Prodigy
27 June	"When Love Takes Over"	David Guetta featuring Kelly Rowland
4 July	"When Love Takes Over"	David Guetta featuring Kelly Rowland
11 July	"When Love Takes Over"	David Guetta featuring Kelly Rowland
18 July	"When Love Takes Over"	David Guetta featuring Kelly Rowland
25 July	"Red Mist VIP / Fired Up"	Danny Byrd / DJ Friction & K Tee
1 August	"I Remember"	Deadmau5 & Kaskade
8 August	"Rock It / Follow the Light"	Sub Focus
15 August	"When Love Takes Over"	David Guetta featuring Kelly Rowland
22 August	"One More Chance"	Bloc Party
29 August	"Ready For The Weekend"	Calvin Harris
5 September	"Ready For The Weekend"	Calvin Harris
12 September	"Take Me to The Hospital"	The Prodigy
19 September	"Take Me to The Hospital"	The Prodigy
26 September	"Celebration"	Madonna
3 October	"Celebration"	Madonna
10 October	"Celebration"	Madonna
17 October	"Celebration"	Madonna
24 October	"Celebration"	Madonna
31 October	"Celebration"	Madonna
7 November	"aNYway"	Armand Van Helden and A-Trak presents Duck Sauce
14 November	"aNYway"	Armand Van Helden and A-Trak presents Duck Sauce
21 November	"aNYway"	Armand Van Helden and A-Trak presents Duck Sauce
28 November	"I Need You"	N-Dubz
5 December	"I Need You"	N-Dubz
12 December	"I Need You"	N-Dubz
19 December	"Let the Bass Kick in Miami Girl"	Chuckie and LMFAO
26 December	"Let the Bass Kick in Miami Girl"	Chuckie and LMFAO

== See also ==
- UK Dance Chart
- List of UK Dance Albums Chart number ones of 2009
- 2009 in British music
