= Rise (The Answer album) =

Studio album by the Answer
- Released: June 26, 2006
- Recorded: 2005
- Genre: Hard rock, blues rock
- Length: 48:03
- Label: Albert Productions
- Producer: Andy Bradfield and Avril MacKintosh

The Answer chronology
Rise (2006)	Everyday Demons (2009)

Alternative cover
- Special Edition Cover Art

Singles from Rise
- 1. "Never Too Late"; 2. "Into The Gutter"; 3. "Under The Sky" Released: 1 October 2006; 4. "Come Follow Me" Released: 18 December 2006; 5. "Be What You Want" Released: 19 March 2007

Professional ratings
Review scores
Source	Rating
AllMusic	3/5 stars
Degeneracion Rock	4.5/5 stars
Indie London	3.5/5 stars
LeedsMusicScene	4.5/5 stars
Hard Rock Hideout	9.5/10 stars
Metal Storm	9/10 stars
Metal Invader	5/5 stars

Rise is the debut album by Northern Ireland rock band the Answer.

The album was recorded at Olympic Studio 1 at the Monnow Valley Studio in Wales and the Albert Studio in London during the fall of 2005. Produced by Andy Bradfield and Avril MacKintosh, the Albert Productions team (with back room production from George Young) and Neal Calderwood from the band's hometown.

Tracks released from the album were "Never Too Late", "Into the Gutter", "Under the Sky", "Come Follow Me" and "Be What You Want".

Their website initially stated that Rise should have been released in the United States by December 2010. However, since signing with Napalm Records, they announced that re-releases of the Answer's back catalogue would be released in the United States and other key territories in the near future. It was eventually released in the US in late 2013.

== Track listings ==
No.	Title	Length
1.	"Under the Sky"	4:09
2.	"Never Too Late"	3:56
3.	"Come Follow Me"	4:10
4.	"Be What You Want"	3:45
5.	"Memphis Water"	6:08
6.	"No Questions Asked"	3:27
7.	"Into the Gutter"	4:03
8.	"Sometimes Your Love"	4:13
9.	"Leavin' Today"	2:59
10.	"Preachin'"	5:57
11.	"Always"	5:12

== Personnel ==
- Cormac Neeson - Lead vocals
- Paul Mahon - Guitar
- Micky Waters - Bass
- James Heatley - Drums

== Studio Personnel ==
Recorded at: Olympic Studios, Monnow Valley, Albert's

Engineered by: Avril Mackintosh, Andy Bradfield

Mixed by: Andy Bradfield

== Special edition ==
A special edition version of the album was released on 17 June 2007 under the name "Rise: Special Edition". It contained two discs, with the first being the original "Rise" track listing, and the second being a collection of B-Sides, live recordings, as well as some acoustic sessions. It was given four out of five stars by TheMusicZine.

=== Special edition disc 2 track listing ===
No.	Title	Length
1.	"Keep Believin'" (Unreleased Chris Sheldon version)	3:54
2.	"I Won't Let You Down" (Unreleased version from Rise sessions)	3:38
3.	"Sweet Emotion" (From the Kerrang! 25 Year CD)	3:54
4.	"Doctor" (Unreleased version from Rise sessions)	4:25
5.	"So Cold" (Unreleased version from Rise sessions)	4:53
6.	"Rock Bottom Blues" (B-side)	4:43
7.	"Some Unity" (B-side)	3:47
8.	"No Questions Asked" (Live session version)	3:28
9.	"Into the Gutter" (Acoustic session)	3:39
10.	"Only the Strong Survive" (Unreleased version from Rise sessions)	3:24
11.	"Not Listening" (Unreleased version from Rise sessions)	6:13
12.	"Come Follow Me" (Live in Tokyo)	5:33
13.	"Sometimes Your Love" (Live in Tokyo)	5:35
14.	"Be What You Want/Moment Jam" (Live in Tokyo)	8:19
15.	"Take It Easy" (Unreleased version from Rise sessions)	4:28

The live versions of "Come Follow Me", "Sometimes Your Love" and "Be What You Want/Moment Jam" are also available on the Everyday Demons special edition CDs.

== Singles ==
=== Under the Sky ===
"Under the Sky" is a song by The Answer which was featured on their album Rise, and was released as a download-only single in 2006.

==== Track listing ====
1. "Under the Sky"
2. "I Won't Let You Down"
3. "Doctor" (live session)
4. "Under the Sky" (video)

=== Come Follow Me ===
"Come Follow Me" is a song by The Answer which was featured on their album Rise, and was released as a download-only single in 2006.

==== Track listing ====
1. "Come Follow Me"
2. "Preachin'" (acoustic)
3. "So Cold"

=== Be What You Want ===
"Be What You Want" is a song by The Answer. It was featured on their album Rise, and was released as a download-only single in 2007.

==== Track listing ====
1. "Be What You Want"
2. "Sweet Emotion"
3. "Into the Gutter" (acoustic)
4. "No Questions Asked" (live radio version)
