= Everyday Demons =

2009 studio album by the Answer

Studio album by The Answer
- Released: 2 March 2009
- Recorded: 2008
- Genre: Hard rock
- Length: 46:10
- Label: Albert Productions
- Producer: James Cassidy; John Travis

The Answer chronology
Rise (2007)	Everyday Demons (2009)	Revival (2011)

Singles from Everyday Demons
- 1. "On and On" Released: 22 February 2009; 2. "Tonight" Released: 21 June 2009; 3. "Comfort Zone" Released: 4 November 2009

Professional ratings
Aggregate scores
Source	Rating
Metacritic	54/100
Review scores
Source	Rating
AllMusic	3/5 stars
Blabbermouth.net	8.5/10
Consequence of Sound	D−
Rolling Stone	2.5/5 stars
Ultimate Guitar	9/10 stars

Everyday Demons is the second studio album by Irish rock band The Answer. It was released on 2 March 2009 in the UK and 31 March 2009 in the US. The album entered the UK Albums Chart at #25.

== Style and composition ==
According to Cormac Neeson, "Demon Eyes" is "basically about the two-faced motherfuckers in this world who think they're the dog's bollocks. They pretend to be your friend but the whole time they're looking down on you in a very f—king condescending way and then going round the corner and slagging you off behind your back." "Too Far Gone" was written in response to then-Prime Minister Tony Blair's plans to introduce ID cards in the UK. In Neeson's opinion, "they might as well attach tracking devices on to everybody so they know exactly where everybody's going at every moment of the day." "On and On" is "about stepping up to the challenges that everyday life throws at you." Neeson explained that "Cry Out" is an attempt to "capture the spirit of youth, that kinda feeling when you're young". The song's lyrics reference Troublegum and "Take the Power Back", by Therapy? and Rage Against the Machine, respectively, two bands favoured by Neeson in his youth. "Why'd You Change Your Mind" relates to Neeson's efforts to comprehend why a friend of his chose to commit suicide. Neeson explains: "In the chorus of the song I'm just trying to understand what goes through a person's mind and why they should take their own life."

"Pride" pertains to Neeson's time working in a bar in Ireland, where "you'd see a lot of really beautiful young women coming into the bar and kinda drink themselves away all day and end up going home with some kind of fucking lowlife motherfucker, who was just hanging around the bars waiting to pick up women like that. I just remember thinking these girls don't need to do that. They're beautiful, intelligent and they deserve a lot better." "Walkin' Mat" is about "the world we're living in at the minute, the one that as you know yourself has the shallow music industry parties that you've got to go to, and everybody's a smiling face and a compliment and you have to really see through that. There's just some point along the way you just get sick of it. You're just talking like that because you're off your face on coke and you don't mean what you're saying." Neeson notes the influence of The Black Crowes and AC/DC on this track.

According to Neeson, "Tonight", the album's second single, is about the "simple philosophy" of "meeting a girl and taking her out and letting the f—king fireworks commence." "Dead of the Night" is about how the band views itself, both at home in Belfast, and around the world. Neeson explains, "When you're away from home you almost start to paint a prettier picture of where you're from, whether it's homesickness or just missing your local pub and friends. When you get back there and you're like, okay, this is the reality, this is the way it is, and that's cool too."

Neeson states that "Comfort Zone" is simply "about stepping out of your comfort zone and taking a chance. I'm a firm believer that you really benefit from taking the riskier decision." "Evil Man" portrays the story of "a girl I know that went to a bar one night and got her drink spiked by one of those date rape drugs. Luckily enough, she got away unscathed." Neeson suggests that the perpetrators of such actions "are fucking scum of the earth." The song is sung from the perspective of the man, "which gives the song a bit of a twist as well."

== Promotion and release ==
The first single, "On and On", was released on 22 February 2009. The second single "Tonight" was released on 21 June 2009. The third single "Comfort Zone" was released on 4 November 2009.

"Demon Eyes" was the iTunes "Single of the Week" for the week beginning 10 March 2009.

The 2CD version of the album includes a concert recorded live at the Shibuya-AX in Tokyo, Japan, on 27 March 2007 as an audio on the second CD.

== Critical reception ==
Everyday Demons was met with "mixed or average" reviews from critics. At Metacritic, which assigns a weighted average rating out of 100 to reviews from mainstream publications, this release received an average score of 54 based on 7 reviews.

In a review for AllMusic, Stephen Thomas Erlewine wrote: "The Answer has the right sound and feel on Everyday Demons and that does make them the perfect opener for latter day AC/DC: they work as pleasant appetizer for the main course." Rolling Stone editor Christian Hoard said "the sound isn't very distinct, and the tunes don't usually stick." At Consequence of Sound, Alex Young said: "Everyday Demons is one of those alright albums that you can listen to a couple of times before tucking it away in the case and waiting for that accidental nostalgia to kick in ages later."

== Track listing ==
Disc One
No.	Title	Length
1.	"Demon Eyes"	4:08
2.	"Too Far Gone"	4:03
3.	"On and On"	3:37
4.	"Cry Out"	5:08
5.	"Why'd You Change Your Mind"	4:52
6.	"Pride"	3:51
7.	"Walkin' Mat"	4:11
8.	"Tonight"	3:42
9.	"Dead of the Night"	3:16
10.	"Comfort Zone"	4:43
11.	"Evil Man"	4:35

Bonus Tracks
No.	Title	Length
12.	"Highwater or Hell" (Japanese/Australian Bonus Track)
13.	"Revolutions" (US Bonus Track)
14.	"Lost" (iTunes US Bonus Track)
15.	"Under the Sky" (Live, iTunes US Bonus Track)

Disc Two (Live At The Shibuya A.X., Tokyo on 27 March 2007)
No.	Title	Length
1.	"Come Follow Me"	5:57
2.	"No Questions Asked"	3:05
3.	"Doctor"	5:00
4.	"Never Too Late"	3:58
5.	"Keep Believin'"	4:40
6.	"Always"	2:20
7.	"Sometimes Your Love"	4:54
8.	"Under the Sky"	7:05
9.	"Preachin'"	8:27
10.	"Into the Gutter"	4:50
11.	"Sweet Emotion"	5:54
12.	"Memphis Water"	6:14
13.	"Be What You Want"	5:02
14.	"Moment/Jam"	3:05

== Personnel ==
Musicians

- Cormac Neeson – lead vocals, harmonica
- Paul Mahon – guitar
- Micky Waters – bass
- James Heatley – drums

Production

- James Cassidy − producer
- John Travis – engineer, producer
- George Marino – mastering
- Mike Fraser – mixing
- Tim Palmer - Mixing

== Sales chart positions ==
Chart performance for Everyday Demons
Chart (2009)	Peak position
French Albums (SNEP)	117
German Albums (Offizielle Top 100)	83
Scottish Albums (OCC)	22
UK Albums (OCC)	25
UK Independent Albums (OCC)	1
UK Rock & Metal Albums (OCC)	1
US Heatseekers Albums (Billboard	39
